= List of Lepidoptera of New Zealand =

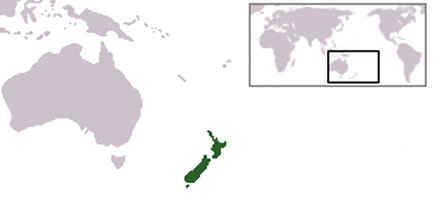
Location of New Zealand

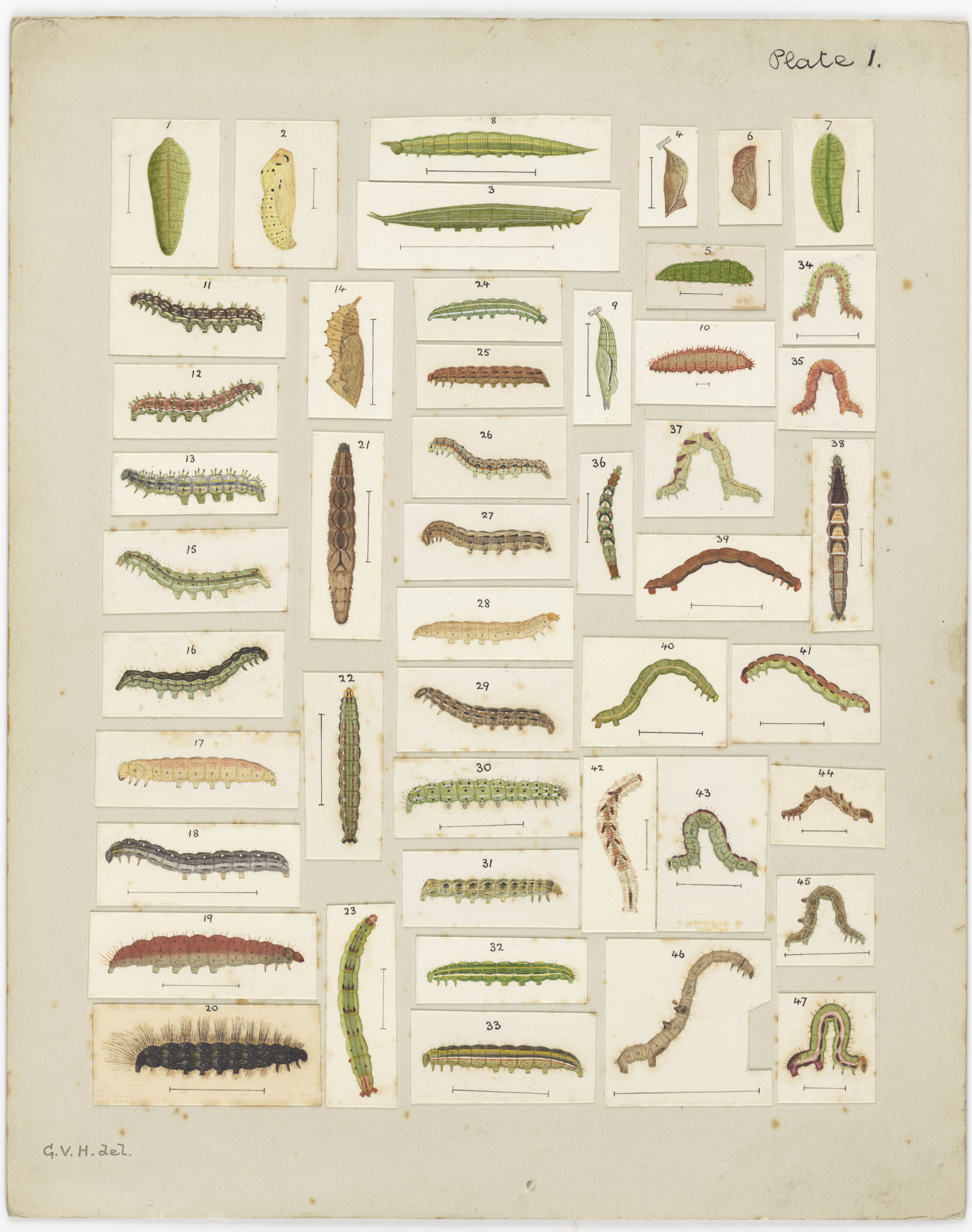
Caterpillars and pupae of several lepidopterans of New Zealand

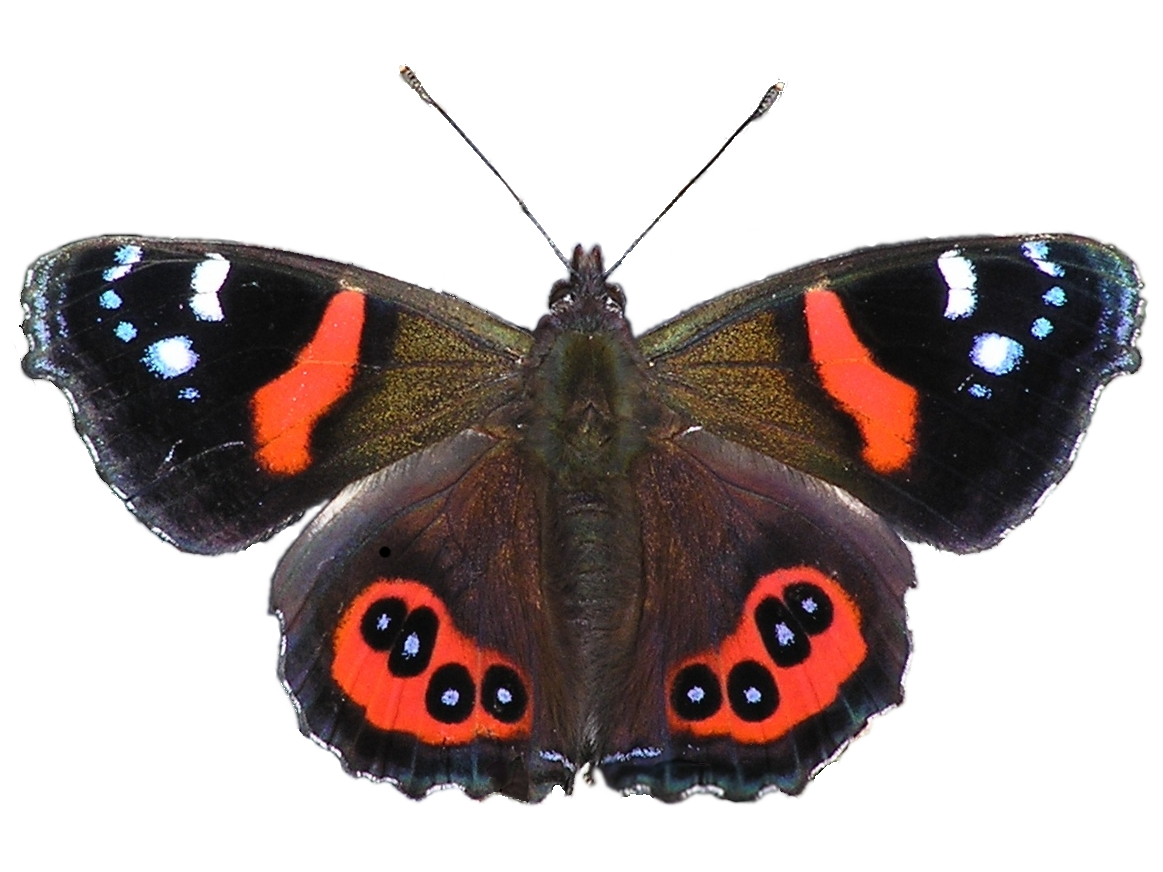
New Zealand red admiral

The Lepidoptera of New Zealand are the butterflies and moths that occur on the islands of New Zealand. According to a recent estimate there are approximately 1,800 lepidopteran species in New Zealand, of which about 1,600 are endemic. Lepidoptera is the third largest insect order in New Zealand.

This page provides a link to either individual species or genera. The latter is used when all species of the genus are endemic to New Zealand, the individual species can be found on the genus page.

== Butterflies ==
=== Lycaenidae ===
- Lampides boeticus (Linnaeus, 1767)
- Lycaena boldenarum White, 1862
  - Lycaena boldenarum boldenarum White, 1862
  - Lycaena boldenarum caerulaea (Salmon, 1946)
  - Lycaena boldenarum ianthina (Salmon, 1946)
- Lycaena feredayi (Bates, 1867)
- Lycaena rauparaha (Fereday, 1877)
- Lycaena salustius (Fabricius, 1793)
- Zizina otis labradus (Godart, 1824)
- Zizina oxleyi (C. & R. Felder, 1865)

=== Nymphalidae ===
- Argyrophenga antipodum Doubleday, 1845
- Argyrophenga harrisi Craw, 1978
- Argyrophenga janitae Craw, 1978
- Danaus petilia (Stoll, 1790) [Not established in N.Z.; vagrant only (non-breeding immigrant)]
- Danaus plexippus (Linnaeus, 1758)
- Dodonidia helmsii Butler, 1884
- Erebiola butleri Fereday, 1879
- Hypolimnas bolina nerina (Fabricius, 1775) [Not established in N.Z.; vagrant only (non-breeding immigrant)]
- Junonia villida calybe Godart, 1819 [Not established in N.Z.; vagrant only (non-breeding immigrant)]
- Melanitis leda bankia (Fabricius, 1775) [Not established in N.Z.; vagrant only (non-breeding immigrant)]
- Percnodaimon merula (Hewitson, 1875)
- Tirumala hamata hamata (MacLeay, 1826) [Not established in N.Z.; vagrant only (non-breeding immigrant)]
- Vanessa gonerilla (Fabricius, 1775)
  - Vanessa gonerilla gonerilla (Fabricius, 1775)
  - Vanessa gonerilla ida (Alfken, 1899)
- Vanessa itea (Fabricius, 1775)
- Vanessa kershawi (McCoy, 1868) [Not resident in N.Z.; breeding migrant]

=== Pieridae ===
- Catopsilia pomona (Fabricius, 1775) [Not established in N.Z.]
- Pieris rapae (Linnaeus, 1758)

== Moths ==
=== Arctiidae ===
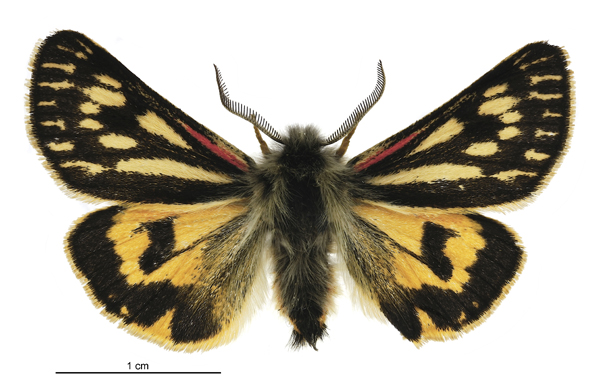
Metacrias huttoni male

- Metacrias erichrysa Meyrick, 1886
- Metacrias huttoni (Butler, 1879)
- Metacrias strategica (Hudson, 1889)
- Nyctemera amicus (White, 1841) (senecio moth; magpie moth)
- Nyctemera annulata (Boisduval, 1832) (magpie moth)
- Tyria jacobaeae (Linnaeus, 1758) (cinnabar moth)
- Utetheisa lotrix lotrix (Cramer, 1777) (crotalaria moth)
- Utetheisa pulchelloides vaga Jordan, 1939

=== Autostichidae ===
- Oegoconia caradjai Popescu-Gorj & Capuse, 1965

=== Batrachedridae ===
- Batrachedra agaura Meyrick, 1901
- Batrachedra arenosella (Walker, 1864) (coconut moth)
- Batrachedra astricta Philpott, 1930
- Batrachedra eucola Meyrick, 1889
- Batrachedra filicicola Meyrick, 1917
- Batrachedra litterata Philpott, 1928
- Batrachedra psithyra Meyrick, 1889
- Batrachedra tristicta Meyrick, 1901
- Houdinia flexilissima Hoare, Dugdale & Watts, 2006

=== Blastobasidae ===
- Blastobasis marmorosella (Wollaston, 1858)

=== Bombycidae ===
- Bombyx mori (Linnaeus, 1758) (domesticated silk moth)

=== Carposinidae ===
- Campbellana attenuata Salmon & Bradley, 1956
- Coscinoptycha improbana Meyrick, 1881 (Australian guava moth)
- Ctenarchis cramboides Dugdale, 1995
- Glaphyrarcha euthrepta Meyrick, 1938
- Heterocrossa adreptella (Walker, 1864)
- Heterocrossa canescens (Philpott, 1930)
- Heterocrossa contactella (Walker, 1866)
- Heterocrossa cryodana Meyrick, 1885
- Heterocrossa epomiana Meyrick, 1885
- Heterocrossa eriphylla Meyrick, 1888
- Heterocrossa exochana Meyrick, 1888
- Heterocrossa gonosemana Meyrick, 1882
- Heterocrossa ignobilis (Philpott, 1930)
- Heterocrossa iophaea Meyrick, 1907
- Heterocrossa literata (Philpott, 1930)
- Heterocrossa maculosa (Philpott, 1927)
- Heterocrossa morbida (Meyrick, 1912)
- Heterocrossa philpotti Dugdale, 1971
- Heterocrossa rubophaga Dugdale, 1988 (New Zealand raspberry budmoth)
- Heterocrossa sanctimonea (Clarke, 1926)
- Heterocrossa sarcanthes (Meyrick, 1918)
- Paramorpha marginata (Philpott, 1931)

=== Cecidosidae ===
- Xanadoses nielseni Hoare & Dugdale, 2003

=== Choreutidae ===
- Asterivora albifasciata (Philpott, 1924)
- Asterivora analoga (Meyrick, 1912)
- Asterivora antigrapha (Meyrick, 1911)
- Asterivora barbigera (Meyrick, 1915)
- Asterivora chatuidea (Clarke, 1926)
- Asterivora colpota (Meyrick, 1911)
- Asterivora combinatana (Walker, 1863)
- Asterivora exocha (Meyrick, 1907)
- Asterivora fasciata (Philpott, 1930)
- Asterivora inspoliata (Philpott, 1930)
- Asterivora iochondra (Meyrick, 1911)
- Asterivora marmarea (Meyrick, 1888)
- Asterivora microlitha (Meyrick, 1888)
- Asterivora ministra (Meyrick, 1912)
- Asterivora nivescens (Philpott, 1926)
- Asterivora oleariae Dugdale, 1979
- Asterivora symbolaea (Meyrick, 1888)
- Asterivora tillyardi (Philpott, 1924)
- Asterivora tristis (Philpott, 1930)
- Asterivora urbana (Clarke, 1926)
- Tebenna micalis (Mann, 1857) (small thistle moth)

=== Coleophoridae ===
- Coleophora alcyonipennella (Kollar, 1832) (clover case-bearer; small clover case-bearer)
- Coleophora deauratella Lienig & Zeller, 1846
- Coleophora mayrella (Huebner, 1813) (metallic coleophora moth)
- Coleophora striatipennella Nylander, 1848
- Coleophora versurella Zeller, 1849

=== Copromorphidae ===
- Isonomeutis amauropa Meyrick, 1888
- Isonomeutis restincta Meyrick, 1923
- Phycomorpha metachrysa Meyrick, 1914

=== Cosmopterigidae ===
- Circoxena ditrocha Meyrick, 1916
- Cosmopterix attenuatella (Walker, 1864)
- Labdia anarithma (Meyrick, 1889)
- Limnaecia phragmitella Stainton, 1851 (shy cosmet moth)
- Microcolona characta Meyrick, 1897
- Microcolona limodes Meyrick, 1897
- Pyroderces aellotricha (Meyrick, 1889)
- Pyroderces apparitella (Walker, 1864)
- Pyroderces deamatella (Walker, 1864)
- Thectophila acmotypa Meyrick, 1927

=== Cossidae ===
- Endoxyla cinereus (Tepper, 1890)

=== Crambidae ===
- Achyra affinitalis (Lederer, 1863) (cotton web spinner)
- Angustalius malacelloides (Bleszynski, 1955)
- Antiscopa acompa (Meyrick, 1884)
- Antiscopa elaphra (Meyrick, 1884)
- Antiscopa epicomia (Meyrick, 1884)
- Clepsicosma iridia Meyrick, 1888
- Culladia cuneiferellus (Walker, 1863)
- Culladia strophaea (Meyrick, 1905)
- Culladia cuneiferellus (Walker, 1863)
- Deana hybreasalis (Walker, 1859)
- Diasemia grammalis Doubleday, 1843
- Eudonia alopecias (Meyrick, 1901)
- Eudonia asaleuta (Meyrick, 1907)
- Eudonia aspidota (Meyrick, 1884)
- Eudonia asterisca (Meyrick, 1884)
- Eudonia atmogramma (Meyrick, 1915)
- Eudonia axena (Meyrick, 1884)
- Eudonia bisinualis (Hudson, 1928)
- Eudonia cataxesta (Meyrick, 1884)
- Eudonia chalara (Meyrick, 1901)
- Eudonia characta (Meyrick, 1884)
- Eudonia chlamydota (Meyrick, 1884)
- Eudonia choristis (Meyrick, 1907)
- Eudonia colpota (Meyrick, 1888)
- Eudonia critica (Meyrick, 1884)
- Eudonia crypsinoa (Meyrick, 1884)
- Eudonia cymatias (Meyrick, 1884)
- Eudonia cyptastis (Meyrick, 1909)
- Eudonia deltophora (Meyrick, 1884)
- Eudonia dinodes (Meyrick, 1884)
- Eudonia dochmia (Meyrick, 1905)
- Eudonia epicremna (Meyrick, 1884)
- Eudonia feredayi (Knaggs, 1867)
- Eudonia gressitti (Munroe, 1964)
- Eudonia gyrotoma (Meyrick, 1909)
- Eudonia hemicycla (Meyrick, 1884)
- Eudonia hemiplaca (Meyrick, 1889)
- Eudonia legnota (Meyrick, 1884)
- Eudonia leptalea (Meyrick, 1884)
- Eudonia leucogramma (Meyrick, 1884)
- Eudonia linealis (Walker, 1866)
- Eudonia locularis (Meyrick, 1912)
- Eudonia luminatrix (Meyrick, 1909)
- Eudonia manganeutis (Meyrick, 1884)
- Eudonia melanaegis (Meyrick, 1884)
- Eudonia meliturga (Meyrick, 1905)
- Eudonia microphthalma (Meyrick, 1884)
- Eudonia minualis (Walker, 1866)
- Eudonia octophora (Meyrick, 1884)
- Eudonia oculata (Philpott, 1927)
- Eudonia oreas (Meyrick, 1884)
- Eudonia organaea (Meyrick, 1901)
- Eudonia pachyerga (Meyrick, 1927)
- Eudonia paltomacha (Meyrick, 1884)
- Eudonia periphanes (Meyrick, 1885)
- Eudonia philerga (Meyrick, 1884)
- Eudonia philetaera (Meyrick, 1884)
- Eudonia pongalis (Felder & Rogenhofer, 1875)
- Eudonia psammitis campbellensis (Munroe, 1964)
- Eudonia psammitis psammitis (Meyrick, 1884)
- Eudonia quaestoria (Meyrick, 1929)
- Eudonia rakaiaensis (Knaggs, 1867)
- Eudonia sabulosella (Walker, 1863)
- Eudonia steropaea (Meyrick, 1884)
- Eudonia subditella (Walker, 1866)
- Eudonia submarginalis (Walker, 1863)
- Eudonia thyridias (Meyrick, 1905)
- Eudonia torodes (Meyrick, 1901)
- Eudonia triclera (Meyrick, 1905)
- Eudonia trivirgata (Felder & Rogenhofer, 1875)
- Eudonia ustiramis (Meyrick, 1931)
- Eudonia xysmatias (Meyrick, 1907)
- Eudonia zophochlaena (Meyrick, 1923)
- Exsilirarcha graminea Salmon & Bradley, 1956
- Gadira acerella Walker, 1866
- Gadira leucophthalma (Meyrick, 1882)
- Gadira petraula (Meyrick, 1882)
- Glaucocharis auriscriptella (Walker, 1864)
- Glaucocharis bipunctella (Walker, 1866)
- Glaucocharis chrysochyta (Meyrick, 1882)
- Glaucocharis elaina (Meyrick, 1882)
- Glaucocharis epiphaea (Meyrick, 1885)
- Glaucocharis harmonica (Meyrick, 1888)
- Glaucocharis helioctypa (Meyrick, 1882)
- Glaucocharis holanthes (Meyrick, 1885)
- Glaucocharis interruptus (Felder & Rogenhofer, 1875)
- Glaucocharis lepidella (Walker, 1866)
- Glaucocharis leucoxantha (Meyrick, 1882)
- Glaucocharis metallifera (Butler, 1877)
- Glaucocharis microdora (Meyrick, 1905)
- Glaucocharis parorma (Meyrick, 1924)
- Glaucocharis planetopa (Meyrick, 1923)
- Glaucocharis pyrsophanes (Meyrick, 1882)
- Glaucocharis selenaea (Meyrick, 1885)
- Glaucocharis stella Meyrick, 1938
- Glyphodes onychinalis(Guenée, 1854)
- Heliothela atra (Butler, 1877)
- Hellula hydralis Guenee, 1854 (cabbage centre grub)
- Hellula undalis Fabricius, 1781 (cabbage webworm; Old World webworm)
- Hygraula nitens (Butler, 1880) (pond moth; Australian water moth)
- Kupea electilis Philpott, 1930
- Maoricrambus oncobolus (Meyrick, 1885)
- Mnesictena adversa (Philpott, 1917)
- Mnesictena antipodea (Salmon, 1956)
- Mnesictena daiclesalis (Walker, 1859)
- Mnesictena flavidalis (Doubleday, 1843)
- Mnesictena marmarina Meyrick, 1884
- Mnesictena notata (Butler, 1879)
- Mnesictena pantheropa (Meyrick, 1902)
- Musotima aduncalis (Felder & Rogenhofer, 1875)
- Musotima nitidalis (Walker, 1866)
- Musotima ochropteralis (Guenée, 1854)
- Orocrambus abditus (Philpott, 1924)
- Orocrambus aethonellus (Meyrick, 1882)
- Orocrambus angustipennis (Zeller, 1877)
- Orocrambus apicellus (Zeller, 1863)
- Orocrambus callirrhous (Meyrick, 1882)
- Orocrambus catacaustus (Meyrick, 1885)
- Orocrambus clarkei clarkei Philpott, 1930
- Orocrambus clarkei eximia Salmon, 1946
- Orocrambus corruptus (Butler, 1877)
- Orocrambus crenaeus (Meyrick, 1885)
- Orocrambus cultus Philpott, 1917
- Orocrambus cyclopicus (Meyrick, 1882)
- Orocrambus dicrenellus (Meyrick, 1882)
- Orocrambus enchophorus (Meyrick, 1885)
- Orocrambus ephorus (Meyrick, 1885)
- Orocrambus flexuosellus (Doubleday, 1843)
- Orocrambus fugitivellus (Hudson, 1950)
- Orocrambus geminus Patrick, 1991
- Orocrambus haplotomus (Meyrick, 1882)
- Orocrambus harpophorus (Meyrick, 1882)
- Orocrambus heliotes (Meyrick, 1888)
- Orocrambus heteraulus (Meyrick, 1905)
- Orocrambus horistes (Meyrick, 1902)
- Orocrambus isochytus (Meyrick, 1888)
- Orocrambus jansoni Gaskin, 1975
- Orocrambus lectus (Philpott, 1929)
- Orocrambus lewisi Gaskin, 1975
- Orocrambus lindsayi Gaskin, 1975
- Orocrambus machaeristes Meyrick, 1905
- Orocrambus melampetrus Purdie, 1884
- Orocrambus melitastes (Meyrick, 1909)
- Orocrambus mylites Meyrick, 1888
- Orocrambus oppositus (Philpott, 1915)
- Orocrambus ordishi Gaskin, 1975
- Orocrambus ornatus (Philpott, 1927)
- Orocrambus paraxenus (Meyrick, 1885)
- Orocrambus philpotti Gaskin, 1975
- Orocrambus punctellus (Hudson, 1950)
- Orocrambus ramosellus (Doubleday, 1843)
- Orocrambus scoparioides Philpott, 1914
- Orocrambus scutatus (Philpott, 1917)
- Orocrambus simplex (Butler, 1877)
- Orocrambus siriellus (Meyrick, 1882)
- Orocrambus sophistes (Meyrick, 1905)
- Orocrambus sophronellus (Meyrick, 1885)
- Orocrambus thymiastes Meyrick, 1901
- Orocrambus tritonellus (Meyrick, 1885)
- Orocrambus tuhualis (Felder & Rogenhofer, 1875)
- Orocrambus ventosus Meyrick, 1920
- Orocrambus vittellus (Doubleday, 1843)
- Orocrambus vulgaris (Butler, 1877)
- Orocrambus xanthogrammus (Meyrick, 1882)
- Proternia philocapna Meyrick, 1884
- Protyparcha scaphodes Meyrick, 1909
- Pyrausta comastis (Meyrick, 1884)
- Sceliodes cordalis (Doubleday, 1843) (eggfruit caterpillar)
- Spoladea recurvalis (Fabricius, 1775)
- Tauroscopa gorgopis Meyrick, 1888
- Tauroscopa notabilis Philpott, 1923
- Tauroscopa trapezitis Meyrick, 1905
- Tawhitia glaucophanes (Meyrick, 1907)
- Tawhitia pentadactylus (Zeller, 1863)
- Uresiphita maorialis (Felder & Rogenhofer, 1875)
- Uresiphita ornithopteralis (Guenée, 1854)

=== Ctenuchidae ===
- Antichloris viridis Druce, 1884 (satin stowaway; banana moth)

=== Depressariidae ===
- Agonopterix alstroemeriana (Clerck, 1759)
- Agonopterix assimilella (Treitschke, 1832)
- Agonopterix umbellana (Fabricius, 1794)
- Agriophara colligatella (Walker, 1864)
- Cryptolechia rhodobapta Meyrick, 1923
- Cryptolechia semnodes Meyrick, 1911
- Depressaria radiella (Goeze, 1783)
- Donacostola notabilis (Philpott, 1928)
- Eutorna caryochroa Meyrick, 1889
- Eutorna inornata Philpott, 1927
- Eutorna phaulocosma Meyrick, 1906
- Eutorna symmorpha Meyrick, 1889
- Heliostibes vibratrix Meyrick, 1927
- Nymphostola galactina (Felder & Rogenhofer, 1875)
- Proteodes carnifex (Butler, 1877)
- Proteodes clarkei Philpott, 1926
- Proteodes melographa Meyrick, 1927
- Proteodes profunda Meyrick, 1905
- Proteodes smithi Howes, 1946

=== Elachistidae ===
- Elachista antipodensis (Dugdale, 1971)
- Elachista archaeonoma Meyrick, 1889
- Elachista eurychora (Meyrick, 1919)
- Elachista exaula Meyrick, 1889
- Elachista galatheae (Viette, 1954)
- Elachista gerasmia Meyrick, 1889
- Elachista helonoma Meyrick, 1889
- Elachista hookeri (Dugdale, 1971)
- Elachista laquaeorum (Dugdale, 1971)
- Elachista melanura Meyrick, 1889
- Elachista napaea Philpott, 1930
- Elachista ochroleuca Meyrick, 1923
- Elachista ombrodoca Meyrick, 1889
- Elachista physalodes Kaila, 2011
- Elachista plagiaula (Meyrick, 1938)
- Elachista pumila (Dugdale, 1971)
- Elachista sagittifera Philpott, 1927
- Elachista thallophora Meyrick, 1889
- Elachista watti Philpott, 1924

=== Epermeniidae ===
- Thambotricha vates Meyrick, 1922

=== Erebidae ===
- Pantydia sparsa Guenée, 1852

=== Galacticidae ===
- Tanaoctena dubia Philpott, 1931

=== Gelechiidae ===
- Anarsia dryinopa Lower, 1897
- Anisoplaca achyrota (Meyrick, 1885)
- Anisoplaca acrodactyla (Meyrick, 1907)
- Anisoplaca cosmia Bradley, 1956
- Anisoplaca fraxinea Philpott, 1928
- Anisoplaca ptyoptera Meyrick, 1885
- Aristotelia paradesma (Meyrick, 1885)
- Athrips zophochalca (Meyrick, 1918)
- Bilobata subsecivella (Zeller, 1852)
- Chrysoesthia drurella (Fabricius, 1775)
- Epiphthora melanombra Meyrick, 1888
- Epiphthora nivea (Philpott, 1930)
- Kiwaia aerobatis (Meyrick, 1924)
- Kiwaia brontophora (Meyrick, 1885)
- Kiwaia caerulaea (Hudson, 1925)
- Kiwaia calaspidea (Clarke, 1934)
- Kiwaia cheradias (Meyrick, 1909)
- Kiwaia contraria (Philpott, 1930)
- Kiwaia dividua (Philpott, 1921)
- Kiwaia eurybathra (Meyrick, 1931)
- Kiwaia glaucoterma (Meyrick, 1911)
- Kiwaia heterospora (Meyrick, 1924)
- Kiwaia hippeis (Meyrick, 1901)
- Kiwaia jeanae Philpott, 1930
- Kiwaia lapillosa (Meyrick, 1924)
- Kiwaia lenis (Philpott, 1929)
- Kiwaia lithodes (Meyrick, 1885)
- Kiwaia matermea (Povolny, 1974)
- Kiwaia monophragma (Meyrick, 1885)
- Kiwaia neglecta (Philpott, 1924)
- Kiwaia parapleura (Meyrick, 1885)
- Kiwaia parvula Philpott, 1930
- Kiwaia pharetria Meyrick, 1885)
- Kiwaia plemochoa (Meyrick, 1916)
- Kiwaia pumila (Philpott, 1928)
- Kiwaia schematica (Meyrick, 1885)
- Kiwaia thyraula (Meyrick, 1885)
- Megacraspedus calamogonus Meyrick, 1885
- Monochroa leptocrossa (Meyrick, 1926)
- Phthorimaea operculella (Zeller, 1873) (potato tuber moth; tobacco splitworm)
- Platyedra subcinerea (Haworth, 1828)
- Scrobipalpa obsoletella (Fischer von Röslerstamm, 1841)
- Sitotroga cerealella (Olivier, 1789) (Angoumois grain moth)
- Symmetrischema striatella (Murtfeldt, 1900)
- Symmetrischema tangolias (Gyen, 1913) (South American potato tuber moth; Andean potato tuber moth; tomato stemborer)
- Thiotricha lindsayi Philpott, 1927
- Thiotricha oleariae Hudson, 1928
- Thiotricha tetraphala (Meyrick, 1885)
- Thiotricha thorybodes (Meyrick, 1885)

=== Geometridae ===
- Adeixis griseata (Hudson, 1903)
- Anachloris subochraria (Doubleday, 1843)
- Aponotoreas anthracias (Meyrick, 1883)
- Aponotoreas dissimilis (Philpott, 1914)
- Aponotoreas incompta (Philpott, 1918)
- Aponotoreas insignis (Butler, 1877)
- Aponotoreas orphnaea (Meyrick, 1884)
- Aponotoreas synclinalis (Hudson, 1903)
- Aponotoreas villosa (Philpott, 1917)
- Arctesthes avatar Patrick, Patrick & Hoare, 2019
- Arctesthes catapyrrha (Butler, 1877)
- Arctesthes siris (Hudson, 1908)
- Arctesthes titanica Patrick, Patrick & Hoare, 2019
- Asaphodes abrogata (Walker, 1862)
- Asaphodes adonis (Hudson, 1898)
- Asaphodes aegrota (Butler, 1879)
- Asaphodes albalineata (Philpott, 1915)
- Asaphodes aphelias (Prout, 1939)
- Asaphodes beata (Butler, 1877)
- Asaphodes camelias (Meyrick, 1888)
- Asaphodes campbellensis (Dugdale, 1964)
- Asaphodes cataphracta (Meyrick, 1883)
- Asaphodes chionogramma (Meyrick, 1883)
- Asaphodes chlamydota (Meyrick, 1883)
- Asaphodes chlorocapna (Meyrick, 1925)
- Asaphodes cinnabari (Howes, 1912)
- Asaphodes citroena (Clarke, 1934)
- Asaphodes clarata (Walker, 1862)
- Asaphodes cosmodora (Meyrick, 1888)
- Asaphodes declarata (Prout, 1914)
- Asaphodes dionysias (Meyrick, 1907)
- Asaphodes exoriens (Prout, 1912)
- Asaphodes frivola (Meyrick, 1913)
- Asaphodes glaciata (Hudson, 1925)
- Asaphodes helias (Meyrick, 1883)
- Asaphodes ida (Clarke, 1926)
- Asaphodes imperfecta (Philpott, 1905)
- Asaphodes limonodes (Meyrick, 1888)
- Asaphodes mnesichola (Meyrick, 1888)
- Asaphodes nephelias (Meyrick, 1883)
- Asaphodes obarata (Felder & Rogenhofer, 1875)
- Asaphodes omichlias (Meyrick, 1883)
- Asaphodes oraria (Philpott, 1903)
- Asaphodes oxyptera (Hudson, 1909)
- Asaphodes periphaea (Meyrick, 1905)
- Asaphodes philpotti (Prout, 1927)
- Asaphodes prasinias (Meyrick, 1883)
- Asaphodes prymnaea (Meyrick, 1911)
- Asaphodes recta (Philpott, 1905)
- Asaphodes sericodes (Meyrick, 1915)
- Asaphodes stephanitis Meyrick, 1907
- Asaphodes stinaria (Guenée, 1868)
- Austrocidaria anguligera (Butler, 1879)
- Austrocidaria arenosa (Howes, 1911)
- Austrocidaria bipartita (Prout, 1958)
- Austrocidaria callichlora (Butler, 1879)
- Austrocidaria cedrinodes (Meyrick, 1911)
- Austrocidaria gobiata (Felder & Rogenhofer, 1875)
- Austrocidaria haemophaea (Meyrick, 1925)
- Austrocidaria lithurga (Meyrick, 1911)
- Austrocidaria parora (Meyrick, 1885)
- Austrocidaria praerupta (Philpott, 1918)
- Austrocidaria prionota (Meyrick, 1884)
- Austrocidaria similata (Walker, 1862)
- Austrocidaria stricta (Philpott, 1915)
- Austrocidaria umbrosa (Philpott, 1917)
- Austrocidaria venustatis (Salmon, 1946)
- Cephalissa siria Meyrick, 1883
- Chalastra aristarcha (Meyrick, 1892)
- Chalastra ochrea (Howes, 1911)
- Chalastra pellurgata Walker, 1862
- Chloroclystis filata (Guenee, 1857) (filata moth)
- Chloroclystis impudicis Dugdale, 1964
- Chloroclystis inductata (Walker, 1862)
- Chloroclystis lichenodes (Purdie, 1887)
- Chloroclystis nereis (Meyrick, 1888)
- Chloroclystis sphragitis (Meyrick, 1888)
- Chloroclystis testulata Guenee, 1857 (pome looper)
- Cleora scriptaria (Walker, 1860)
- Chrysolarentia subrectaria (Guenee, 1858)
- Dasyuris anceps (Butler, 1877)
- Dasyuris austrina Philpott, 1928
- Dasyuris callicrena (Meyrick, 1883)
- Dasyuris catadees Prout, 1939
- Dasyuris enysii (Butler, 1877)
- Dasyuris fulminea Philpott, 1915
- Dasyuris hectori (Butler, 1877)
- Dasyuris leucobathra Meyrick, 1911
- Dasyuris micropolis Meyrick, 1929
- Dasyuris octans Hudson, 1923
- Dasyuris partheniata Guenee, 1868
- Dasyuris pluviata Hudson, 1928
- Dasyuris strategica (Meyrick, 1883)
- Dasyuris transaurea Howes, 1912
- Declana floccosa Walker, 1858 (forest semilooper)
- Declana foxii Dugdale & Emmerson, 2023
- Declana lupa Dugdale & Emmerson, 2023
- Declana nigrosparsa Butler, 1879
- Declana niveata Butler, 1879
- Dichromodes cynica Meyrick, 1911
- Dichromodes gypsotis Meyrick, 1888
- Dichromodes ida Hudson, 1905
- Dichromodes niger (Butler, 1877)
- Dichromodes simulans Hudson, 1908
- Dichromodes sphaeriata (Felder & Rogenhofer, 1875)
- Elvia glaucata Walker, 1862
- Epicyme rubropunctaria (Doubleday, 1843)
- Epiphryne charidema (Meyrick, 1909)
- Epiphryne undosata (Felder & Rogenhofer, 1875)
- Epiphryne verriculata (Felder & Rogenhofer, 1875) (cabbage tree moth)
- Epiphryne xanthaspis (Meyrick, 1883)
- Epyaxa lucidata (Walker, 1862)
- Epyaxa rosearia (Doubleday, 1843) (native looper)
- Epyaxa venipunctata (Walker, 1863)
- Gellonia dejectaria (Walker, 1860) (brown evening moth)
- Gellonia pannularia (Guenee, 1868)
- Gingidiobora nebulosa (Philpott, 1917)
- Gingidiobora subobscurata (Walker, 1862)
- Helastia alba Craw, 1987
- Helastia angusta Craw, 1987
- Helastia christinae Craw, 1987
- Helastia cinerearia (Doubleday, 1843)
- Helastia clandestina (Philpott, 1921)
- Helastia corcularia (Guenee, 1868)
- Helastia cryptica Craw, 1987
- Helastia cymozeucta (Meyrick, 1913)
- Helastia expolita (Philpott, 1917)
- Helastia farinata (Warren, 1896)
- Helastia mutabilis Craw, 1987
- Helastia ohauensis Craw, 1987
- Helastia plumbea (Philpott, 1915)
- Helastia salmoni Craw, 1987
- Helastia scissa Craw, 1987
- Helastia semisignata (Walker, 1862)
- Helastia siris (Hawthorne, 1897)
- Helastia triphragma (Meyrick, 1883)
- Homodotis amblyterma (Meyrick, 1931)
- Homodotis falcata (Butler, 1879)
- Homodotis megaspilata (Walker, 1862)
- Horisme suppressaria (Walker, 1863)
- Hydriomena arida (Butler, 1879)
- Hydriomena canescens Philpott, 1918
- Hydriomena clarkei (Howes, 1917)
- Hydriomena deltoidata (Walker, 1862)
- Hydriomena hemizona Meyrick, 1897
- Hydriomena iolanthe Hudson, 1939
- Hydriomena purpurifera Fereday, 1884
- Hydriomena rixata (Felder & Rogenhofer, 1875)
- Ipana atronivea Walker, 1865 (North Island lichen moth)
- Ipana egregia Felder & Rogenhofer, 1875 (South Island lichen moth)
- Ipana feredayi (Butler, 1877)
- Ipana glacialis Hudson, 1903
- Ipana griseata (Hudson, 1898)
- Ipana halocarpi Dugdale & Emmerson, 2023
- Ipana hermione (Hudson, 1898)
- Ipana junctilinea Walker, 1865
- Ipana leptomera Walker, 1858
- Ipana perdita Dugdale & Emmerson, 2023
- Ischalis dugdalei Weintraub & Scoble, 2004
- Ischalis fortinata (Guenee, 1868)
- Ischalis gallaria (Walker, 1860)
- Ischalis nelsonaria (Felder & Rogenhofer, 1875)
- Ischalis variabilis (Warren, 1895)
- Microdes epicryptis Meyrick, 1897
- Microdes quadristrigata Walker, 1862
- Notoreas arcuata Philpott, 1921
- Notoreas atmogramma Meyrick, 1911
- Notoreas blax Prout, 1939
- Notoreas casanova Patrick & Hoare, 2010
- Notoreas chioneres Prout, 1939
- Notoreas chrysopeda (Meyrick, 1888)
- Notoreas edwardsi Patrick & Hoare, 2010
- Notoreas galaxias Hudson, 1928
- Notoreas hexaleuca (Meyrick, 1914)
- Notoreas ischnocyma Meyrick, 1905
- Notoreas isoleuca Meyrick, 1897
- Notoreas isomoera Prout, 1939
- Notoreas mechanitis (Meyrick, 1883)
- Notoreas niphocrena (Meyrick, 1883)
- Notoreas ortholeuca Hudson, 1923
- Notoreas paradelpha (Meyrick, 1883)
- Notoreas perornata (Walker, 1863)
- Notoreas simplex Hudson, 1898
- Orthoclydon chlorias (Meyrick, 1884)
- Orthoclydon praefectata (Walker, 1861)
- Orthoclydon pseudostinaria (Hudson, 1918)
- Paradetis porphyrias (Meyrick, 1883)
- Paranotoreas brephosata (Walker, 1862)
- Paranotoreas ferox (Butler, 1877)
- Paranotoreas fulva (Hudson, 1905)
- Paranotoreas opipara Philpott, 1915
- Paranotoreas zopyra (Meyrick, 1883)
- Pasiphila acompsa (Prout, 1927)
- Pasiphila aristias (Meyrick, 1897)
- Pasiphila bilineolata (Walker, 1862)
- Pasiphila charybdis (Butler, 1879)
- Pasiphila cotinaea (Meyrick, 1913)
- Pasiphila dryas Meyrick, 1891
- Pasiphila erratica (Philpott, 1916)
- Pasiphila fumipalpata (Felder & Rogenhofer, 1875)
- Pasiphila furva (Philpott, 1917)
- Pasiphila halianthes (Meyrick, 1907)
- Pasiphila heighwayi (Philpott, 1927)
- Pasiphila humilis (Philpott, 1917)
- Pasiphila lunata (Philpott, 1912)
- Pasiphila magnimaculata (Philpott, 1915)
- Pasiphila malachita (Meyrick, 1913)
- Pasiphila melochlora (Meyrick, 1911)
- Pasiphila muscosata (Walker, 1862)
- Pasiphila nebulosa Dugdale, 1971
- Pasiphila plinthina Meyrick, 1888
- Pasiphila punicea (Philpott, 1923)
- Pasiphila rivalis (Philpott, 1916)
- Pasiphila rubella (Philpott, 1915)
- Pasiphila sandycias (Meyrick, 1905)
- Pasiphila semochlora (Meyrick, 1919)
- Pasiphila suffusa (Hudson, 1928)
- Pasiphila urticae (Hudson, 1939)
- Pasiphila vieta (Hudson, 1950)
- Phrissogonus laticostatus (Walker, 1862) (apple looper)
- Poecilasthena pulchraria (Doubleday, 1843)
- Poecilasthena schistaria (Walker, 1861)
- Poecilasthena subpurpureata (Walker, 1863)
- Pseudocoremia albafasciata (Philpott, 1915)
- Pseudocoremia amaculata Stephens & Gibbs, 2003
- Pseudocoremia berylia (Howes, 1943)
- Pseudocoremia campbelli (Philpott, 1927)
- Pseudocoremia cineracia Howes, 1942
- Pseudocoremia colpogramma (Meyrick, 1936)
- Pseudocoremia dugdalei Stephens & Gibbs, 2003
- Pseudocoremia fascialata (Philpott, 1903)
- Pseudocoremia fenerata (Felder & Rogenhofer, 1875)
- Pseudocoremia flava Warren, 1896
- Pseudocoremia fluminea (Philpott, 1926)
- Pseudocoremia foxi Stephens, Gibbs, Patrick, 2007
- Pseudocoremia hollyae Stephens, Gibbs, Patrick, 2007
- Pseudocoremia hudsoni Stephens, Gibbs, Patrick, 2007
- Pseudocoremia indistincta Butler, 1877
- Pseudocoremia insignita (Philpott, 1930)
- Pseudocoremia lactiflua (Meyrick, 1912)
- Pseudocoremia leucelaea (Meyrick, 1909)
- Pseudocoremia lupinata (Felder & Rogenhofer, 1875)
- Pseudocoremia lutea (Philpott, 1914)
- Pseudocoremia melinata (Felder & Rogenhofer, 1875)
- Pseudocoremia modica (Philpott, 1921)
- Pseudocoremia monacha (Hudson, 1903)
- Pseudocoremia ombrodes (Meyrick, 1902)
- Pseudocoremia pergrata (Philpott, 1930)
- Pseudocoremia productata (Walker, 1862)
- Pseudocoremia rudisata (Walker, 1862)
- Pseudocoremia suavis Butler, 1879 (common forest looper)
- Pseudocoremia terrena (Philpott, 1915)
- Samana acutata Butler, 1877
- Samana falcatella Walker, 1863
- Sarisa muriferata (Walker, 1863)
- Scopula rubraria (Doubleday, 1843)
- Sestra flexata (Walker, 1862)
- Sestra humeraria (Walker, 1861)
- Sigillictystis insigillata (Walker, 1862)
- Tatosoma agrionata (Walker, 1862)
- Tatosoma alta Philpott, 1913
- Tatosoma apicipallida Prout, 1914
- Tatosoma fasciata Philpott, 1914
- Tatosoma lestevata (Walker, 1862)
- Tatosoma monoviridisata Clarke, 1920
- Tatosoma tipulata (Walker, 1862)
- Tatosoma topea Philpott, 1903
- Tatosoma transitaria (Walker, 1862)
- Theoxena scissaria (Guenee, 1868)
- Xanthorhoe bulbulata (Guenee, 1868)
- Xanthorhoe frigida Howes, 1946
- Xanthorhoe lophogramma Meyrick, 1897
- Xanthorhoe occulta Philpott, 1903
- Xanthorhoe orophyla (Meyrick, 1883)
- Xanthorhoe orophylloides Hudson, 1909
- Xanthorhoe semifissata (Walker, 1862)
- Xyridacma alectoraria (Walker, 1860)
- Xyridacma ustaria (Walker, 1863)
- Xyridacma veronicae Prout, 1934
- Zermizinga indocilisaria Walker, 1863

=== Glyphipterigidae ===
- Glyphipterix achlyoessa (Meyrick, 1880)
- Glyphipterix acronoma Meyrick, 1888
- Glyphipterix acrothecta Meyrick, 1880
- Glyphipterix aenea Philpott, 1917
- Glyphipterix aerifera Meyrick, 1912
- Glyphipterix astrapaea Meyrick, 1880
- Glyphipterix ataracta (Meyrick, 1888)
- Glyphipterix aulogramma Meyrick, 1907
- Glyphipterix bactrias Meyrick, 1911
- Glyphipterix barbata Philpott, 1918
- Glyphipterix brachydelta Meyrick, 1916
- Glyphipterix calliactis Meyrick, 1914
- Glyphipterix cionophora (Meyrick, 1888)
- Glyphipterix codonias Meyrick, 1909
- Glyphipterix dichorda Meyrick, 1911
- Glyphipterix erastis Meyrick, 1911
- Glyphipterix euastera Meyrick, 1880
- Glyphipterix iocheaera Meyrick, 1880
- Glyphipterix leptosema Meyrick, 1888
- Glyphipterix metasticta Meyrick, 1907
- Glyphipterix morangella Felder & Rogenhofer, 1875
- Glyphipterix necopina Philpott, 1927
- Glyphipterix nephoptera Meyrick, 1888
- Glyphipterix octonaria Philpott, 1924
- Glyphipterix oxymachaera (Meyrick, 1880)
- Glyphipterix rugata Meyrick, 1915
- Glyphipterix scintilella Walker, 1864
- Glyphipterix scintilla Clarke, 1926
- Glyphipterix scolias Meyrick, 1910
- Glyphipterix similis Philpott, 1928
- Glyphipterix simpliciella (Stephens, 1834)
- Glyphipterix triselena Meyrick, 1880
- Glyphipterix tungella Felder & Rogenhofer, 1875
- Glyphipterix xestobela (Meyrick, 1888)
- Glyphipterix zelota Meyrick, 1888
- Pantosperma holochalca Meyrick, 1888

=== Gracillariidae ===
- Acrocercops aellomacha (Meyrick, 1880)
- Acrocercops aethalota (Meyrick, 1880)
- Acrocercops alysidota (Meyrick, 1880) (wattle miner)
- Acrocercops laciniella (Meyrick, 1880)
- Acrocercops panacicorticis (Watt, 1920)
- Acrocercops panacifinens (Watt, 1920)
- Acrocercops panacitorsens (Watt, 1920)
- Acrocercops panacivagans (Watt, 1920)
- Acrocercops panacivermiformis (Watt, 1920)
- Acrocercops zorionella (Hudson, 1918)
- Caloptilia azaleella (Brants, 1913) (azalea leaf miner)
- Caloptilia chalcodelta (Meyrick, 1889)
- Caloptilia chrysitis (Felder & Rogenhofer, 1875)
- Caloptilia elaeas (Meyrick, 1911)
- Caloptilia linearis (Butler, 1877)
- Caloptilia octopunctata (Turner, 1894)
- Caloptilia selenitis (Meyrick, 1909)
- Conopomorpha cyanospila Meyrick, 1885
- Dialectica scalariella (Zeller, 1850)
- Macarostola ida (Meyrick, 1880)
- Macarostola miniella (Felder & Rogenhofer, 1875)
- Parectopa leucocyma (Meyrick, 1889) (kauri leaf miner)
- Phyllonorycter messaniella (Zeller, 1846) (European oak leaf miner; Zeller's midget)
- Porphyrosela hardenbergiella (Wise, 1957)
- Polysoma eumetalla (Meyrick, 1880)
- Sabulopteryx botanica Hoare, Patrick & Buckley, 2019

=== Hepialidae ===
- Aenetus virescens (Doubleday, 1843) (pūriri moth)
- Aoraia aspina Dugdale, 1994
- Aoraia aurimaculata (Philpott, 1914)
- Aoraia dinodes (Meyrick, 1890)
- Aoraia enysii (Butler, 1877)
- Aoraia flavida Dugdale, 1994
- Aoraia hespera Dugdale, 1994
- Aoraia insularis Dugdale, 1994
- Aoraia lenis Dugdale, 1994
- Aoraia macropis Dugdale, 1994
- Aoraia oreobolae Dugdale, 1994
- Aoraia orientalis Dugdale, 1994
- Aoraia rufivena Dugdale, 1994 (rufous-veined aoraia)
- Aoraia senex (Hudson, 1908)
- Cladoxycanus minos (Hudson, 1905)
- Dioxycanus fuscus (Philpott, 1914)
- Dioxycanus oreas (Hudson, 1920)
- Dumbletonius characterifer (Walker, 1865)
- Dumbletonius unimaculatus (Salmon, 1948)
- Heloxycanus patricki Dugdale, 1994 (ghost moth; sphagnum porina moth)
- Wiseana cervinata (Walker, 1865) (porina moth)
- Wiseana copularis (Meyrick, 1912)
- Wiseana fuliginea (Butler, 1879)
- Wiseana jocosa (Meyrick, 1912)
- Wiseana mimica (Philpott, 1923)
- Wiseana signata (Walker, 1856)
- Wiseana umbraculata (Guenee, 1868)

=== Lecithoceridae ===
- Compsistis bifaciella (Walker, 1864)
- Lecithocera micromela (Lower, 1897)
- Sarisophora leucoscia Turner, 1919

=== Lymantriidae ===
- Orgyia thyellina Butler, 1881 (white-spotted tussock moth)
- Teia anartoides Walker, 1855 (painted apple moth)

=== Lyonetidae ===
- Bedellia psamminella Meyrick, 1889
- Bedellia somnulentella (Zeller, 1847) (sweet potato leaf miner)
- Leucoptera spartifoliella (Hübner, 1813) (Scotch broom twig miner)
- Stegommata leptomitella Meyrick, 1880
- Stegommata sulfuratella Meyrick, 1880

=== Micropterigidae ===
- Sabatinca aemula Philpott, 1924
- Sabatinca aenea Hudson, 1923
- Sabatinca aurantissima Gibbs, 2014
- Sabatinca aurella Hudson, 1918
- Sabatinca bimacula Gibbs, 2014
- Sabatinca calliarcha Meyrick, 1912
- Sabatinca caustica Meyrick, 1912
- Sabatinca chalcophanes (Meyrick, 1885)
- Sabatinca chrysargyra (Meyrick, 1885)
- Sabatinca demissa Philpott, 1923
- Sabatinca doroxena (Meyrick, 1888)
- Sabatinca heighwayi Philpott, 1927
- Sabatinca ianthina Philpott, 1921
- Sabatinca incongruella Walker, 1863
- Sabatinca lucilia Clarke, 1920
- Sabatinca pluvialis Gibbs, 2014
- Sabatinca quadrijuga Meyrick, 1912
- Sabatinca weheka Gibbs, 2014
- Zealandopterix zonodoxa (Meyrick, 1888)

=== Mnesarchaeidae ===
- Mnesarchaea fallax Philpott, 1927
- Mnesarchaea fusca Philpott, 1922
- Mnesarchaea hudsoni Gibbs, 2019
- Mnesarchaea paracosma Meyrick, 1885
- Mnesarchella acuta (Philpott, 1919)
- Mnesarchella dugdalei Gibbs, 2019
- Mnesarchella falcata Gibbs, 2019
- Mnesarchella fusilella (Walker, 1864)
- Mnesarchella hamadelpha (Meyrick, 1888)
- Mnesarchella loxoscia (Meyrick, 1888)
- Mnesarchella ngahuru Gibbs, 2019
- Mnesarchella philpotti Gibbs, 2019
- Mnesarchella stellae Gibbs, 2019
- Mnesarchella vulcanica Gibbs, 2019

=== Momphidae ===
- Zapyrastra calliphana Meyrick, 1889
- Zapyrastra stellata (Philpott, 1931)

=== Nepticulidae ===
- Stigmella aigialeia Donner & Wilkinson, 1989
- Stigmella aliena Donner & Wilkinson, 1989
- Stigmella atrata Donner & Wilkinson, 1989
- Stigmella cassiniae Donner & Wilkinson, 1989
- Stigmella childi Donner & Wilkinson, 1989
- Stigmella cypracma (Meyrick, 1916)
- Stigmella erysibodea Donner & Wilkinson, 1989
- Stigmella fulva (Watt, 1921)
- Stigmella hakekeae Donner & Wilkinson, 1989
- Stigmella hamishella Donner & Wilkinson, 1989
- Stigmella hoheriae Donner & Wilkinson, 1989
- Stigmella ilsea Donner & Wilkinson, 1989
- Stigmella insignis (Philpott, 1927)
- Stigmella kaimanua Donner & Wilkinson, 1989
- Stigmella laquaeorum (Dugdale, 1971)
- Stigmella lucida (Philpott, 1919)
- Stigmella maoriella (Walker, 1864)
- Stigmella microtheriella (Stainton, 1854)
- Stigmella ogygia (Meyrick, 1889)
- Stigmella oriastra (Meyrick, 1917)
- Stigmella palaga Donner & Wilkinson, 1989
- Stigmella platina Donner & Wilkinson, 1989
- Stigmella progama (Meyrick, 1924)
- Stigmella progonopis (Meyrick, 1921)
- Stigmella propalaea (Meyrick, 1889)
- Stigmella sophorae (Hudson, 1939)
- Stigmella tricentra (Meyrick, 1889)
- Stigmella watti Donner & Wilkinson, 1989

=== Noctuidae ===
- Achaea janata (Linnaeus, 1758) (castor semi-looper)
- Agrotis admirationis Guenée, 1868
- Agrotis infusa Boisduval, 1838 (bogong moth)
- Agrotis innominata Hudson, 1898
- Agrotis ipsilon (Hufnagel, 1766) (dark sword-grass; black cutworm)
- Agrotis munda (Walker, 1857) (brown cutworm; pink cutworm)
- Anomis flava Fabricius, 1775 (cotton looper; tropical anomis; white-pupilled scallop moth)
- Anomis involuta (Walker, 1858) (jute looper; hibiscus cutworm)
- Anticarsia irrorata (Fabricius, 1781) (irrorated tabby)
- Arcte coerula (Guenee, 1852) (ramie moth)
- Artigisa melanephele Hampson, 1914
- Athetis tenuis (Butler, 1886)
- Athetis thoracica (Moore, 1884) (recorded as Athetis nonagrica)
- Australothis volatilis Matthews & Patrick, 1998
- Austramathes fortis (Butler, 1880)
- Austramathes coelacantha Hoare, 2017
- Austramathes purpurea (Butler, 1879)
- Austramathes pessota (Meyrick, 1887)
- Austramathes squaliolus Hoare, 2017
- Bityla defigurata (Walker, 1865)
- Bityla sericea Butler, 1877
- Callopistria maillardi (Guénée, 1862)
- Chrysodeixis argentifera (Guenee, 1852) (tobacco looper)
- Chrysodeixis eriosoma (Doubleday, 1843) (green garden looper)
- Condica illecta (Walker, 1865)
- Cosmodes elegans (Donovan, 1805) (green blotched moth)
- Ctenoplusia albostriata (Bremer & Grey, 1853)
- Ctenoplusia limbirena (Guenée, 1852)
- Dasypodia cymatodes Guenee, 1852 (northern old lady)
- Dasypodia selenophora Guenee, 1852 (southern old lady)
- Diarsia intermixta (Guenee, 1852)
- Ectopatria aspera (Walker, 1857)
- Eudocima phalonia (Clerck, 1764) (fruit-piercing moth)
- Eudocima materna (Linnaeus, 1767)
- Euxoa ceropachoides (Guenée, 1868)
- Feredayia graminosa (Walker, 1857) (mahoe stripper; green mahoe moth)
- Grammodes pulcherrima T.P. Lucas, 1892
- Helicoverpa armigera conferta (Walker, 1857) (cotton bollworm; corn earworm; Old World (African) bollworm)
- Helicoverpa punctigera (Wallengren, 1860) (native budworm; Australian bollworm)
- Hydrillodes surata Meyrick, 1910
- Hypena gonospilalis (Walker, 1866)
- Hypocala deflorata australiae Butler, 1892
- Ichneutica acontistis (Meyrick, 1887)
- Ichneutica agorastis (Meyrick, 1887)
- Ichneutica alopa (Meyrick, 1887)
- Ichneutica arotis (Meyrick, 1887)
- Ichneutica atristriga (Walker, 1865)
- Ichneutica averilla (Hudson, 1921)
- Ichneutica barbara Hoare, 2019
- Ichneutica blenheimensis (Fereday, 1883)
- Ichneutica bromias (Meyrick, 1902)
- Ichneutica brunneosa (Fox, 1970)
- Ichneutica cana Howes, 1914
- Ichneutica ceraunias Meyrick, 1887
- Ichneutica chlorodonta (Hampson, 1911)
- Ichneutica chryserythra (Hampson, 1905)
- Ichneutica cornuta Hoare, 2019
- Ichneutica cuneata (Philpott, 1916)
- Ichneutica dione Hudson, 1898
- Ichneutica disjungens (Walker, 1858)
- Ichneutica dundastica Hoare, 2019
- Ichneutica emmersonorum Hoare, 2019
- Ichneutica epiastra (Meyrick, 1911)
- Ichneutica erebia (Hudson, 1909)
- Ichneutica falsidica (Meyrick, 1911)
- Ichneutica fenwicki (Philpott, 1921)
- Ichneutica fibriata (Meyrick, 1913)
- Ichneutica haedifrontella Hoare, 2019
- Ichneutica hartii (Howes, 1914)
- Ichneutica infensa (Walker, 1857)
- Ichneutica inscripta Hoare, 2019
- Ichneutica insignis (Walker, 1865)
- Ichneutica lignana (Walker, 1857)
- Ichneutica lindsayorum (Dugdale, 1988)
- Ichneutica lissoxyla (Meyrick, 1911)
- Ichneutica lithias (Meyrick, 1887)
- Ichneutica lyfordi Hoare, 2019
- Ichneutica marmorata (Hudson, 1924)
- Ichneutica maya (Hudson, 1898)
- Ichneutica micrastra (Meyrick, 1897)
- Ichneutica moderata (Walker, 1865)
- Ichneutica mollis (Howes, 1908)
- Ichneutica morosa (Butler, 1880)
- Ichneutica mustulenta Hoare, 2019
- Ichneutica mutans (Walker, 1857) (grey-brown cutworm)
- Ichneutica naufraga Hoare, 2019
- Ichneutica nobilia (Howes, 1946)
- Ichneutica notata Salmon, 1946
- Ichneutica nullifera (Walker, 1857)
- Ichneutica olivea (Watt,1916)
- Ichneutica oliveri (Hampson, 1911)
- Ichneutica omicron (Hudson, 1898)
- Ichneutica omoplaca (Meyrick, 1887)
- Ichneutica pagaia (Hudson, 1909)
- Ichneutica pelanodes (Meyrick, 1931)
- Ichneutica peridotea Hoare, 2019
- Ichneutica panda (Philpott, 1920)
- Ichneutica paracausta (Meyrick, 1887)
- Ichneutica paraxysta (Meyrick, 1929)
- Ichneutica petrograpta (Meyrick, 1929)
- Ichneutica phaula (Meyrick, 1887)
- Ichneutica plena (Walker, 1865)
- Ichneutica prismatica Hoare, 2019
- Ichneutica propria (Walker, 1856)
- Ichneutica purdii (Fereday, 1883)
- Ichneutica rubescens Butler, 1879
- Ichneutica rufistriga Hoare, 2019
- Ichneutica sapiens (Meyrick, 1929)
- Ichneutica scutata (Meyrick, 1929)
- Ichneutica seducta Hoare, 2019
- Ichneutica semivittata (Walker, 1865)
- Ichneutica sericata (Howes, 1945)
- Ichneutica sistens (Guenee, 1868)
- Ichneutica skelloni (Butler, 1880)
- Ichneutica similis (Philpott, 1924)
- Ichneutica sollennis (Meyrick, 1914)
- Ichneutica steropastis (Meyrick, 1887)
- Ichneutica stulta (Philpott, 1905)
- Ichneutica subcyprea Hoare, 2019
- Ichneutica sulcana (Fereday, 1880)
- Ichneutica supersulcana Hoare, 2019
- Ichneutica thalassarche Hoare, 2019
- Ichneutica theobroma Hoare, 2019
- Ichneutica toroneura (Meyrick, 1901)
- Ichneutica unica (Walker, 1856)
- Ichneutica ustistriga (Walker, 1857)
- Ichneutica virescens (Butler, 1879)
- Leucania stenographa Lower 1900
- Meterana alcyone (Hudson, 1898)
- Meterana asterope (Hudson, 1898)
- Meterana badia (Philpott, 1927)
- Meterana coctilis (Meyrick, 1931)
- Meterana coeleno (Hudson, 1898)
- Meterana decorata (Philpott, 1905)
- Meterana diatmeta (Hudson, 1898)
- Meterana dotata (Walker, 1857)
- Meterana exquisita (Philpott, 1903)
- Meterana grandiosa (Philpott, 1903)
- Meterana inchoata (Philpott, 1920)
- Meterana levis (Philpott, 1905)
- Meterana merope (Hudson, 1898)
- Meterana meyricci (Hampson, 1911)
- Meterana ochthistis (Meyrick, 1887)
- Meterana octans (Hudson, 1898)
- Meterana pansicolor (Howes, 1912)
- Meterana pascoi (Howes, 1912)
- Meterana pauca (Philpott, 1910)
- Meterana pictula (White, 1855)
- Meterana praesignis (Howes, 1911)
- Meterana stipata (Walker, 1865)
- Meterana tartarea (Butler, 1877)
- Meterana tetrachroa (Meyrick, 1931)
- Meterana vitiosa (Butler, 1877)
- Mocis alterna (Walker, 1858)
- Mocis frugalis (Fabricius, 1775) (sugarcane looper)
- Mocis trifasciata (Stephens, 1830)
- Mythimna separata (Walker, 1865) (northern armyworm; Oriental armyworm; rice ear-cutting caterpillar)
- Nivetica nervosa (Hudson, 1922)
- Pantydia sparsa Guenée, 1852
- Persectania aversa (Walker, 1856)
- Phalaenoides glycinae Lewin, 1805
- Physetica caerulea (Guenee, 1868)
- Physetica cucullina (Guenee, 1868)
- Physetica funerea (Philpott, 1927)
- Physetica homoscia (Meyrick, 1887)
- Physetica longstaffi (Howes, 1911)
- Physetica phricias (Meyrick, 1887)
- Physetica prionistis (Meyrick, 1887)
- Physetica temperata (Walker, 1858)
- Physetica sequens (Howes, 1911)
- Proteuxoa comma (Walker, 1856)
- Proteuxoa sanguinipuncta (Guenee, 1868)
- Proteuxoa tetronycha Hoare, 2017
- Rhapsa scotosialis Walker, 1866 (slender owlet moth)
- Schrankia costaestrigalis (Stephens, 1834) (pinion-streaked snout)
- Speiredonia spectans (Guenee, 1852) (granny's cloak moth)
- Spodoptera exempta (Walker, 1857) (African armyworm)
- Spodoptera litura (Fabricius, 1775) (Oriental leafworm; cluster caterpillar; cotton leafworm; tobacco cutworm; tropical armyworm)
- Spodoptera mauritia acronyctoides Guenee, 1852 (lawn armyworm)
- Tathorhynchus exsiccata fallax Swinhoe, 1902
- Thysanoplusia orichalcea (Fabricius, 1775) (slender burnished brass; soybean looper)
- Tiracola plagiata (Walker, 1857) (cacao armyworm)
- Trigonistis anticlina (Meyrick, 1901)

=== Nolidae ===
- Nola parvitis (Howes, 1917)
- Uraba lugens Walker, 1863

=== Oecophoridae ===
- Atomotricha chloronota Meyrick, 1914
- Atomotricha exsomnis Meyrick, 1913
- Atomotricha isogama Meyrick, 1909
- Atomotricha lewisi Philpott, 1927
- Atomotricha oeconoma Meyrick, 1914
- Atomotricha ommatias Meyrick, 1883
- Atomotricha prospiciens Meyrick, 1924
- Atomotricha sordida (Butler, 1877)
- Atomotricha versuta Meyrick, 1914
- Barea codrella (Felder & Rogenhofer, 1875)
- Barea confusella (Walker, 1864)
- Barea consignatella Walker, 1864
- Barea exarcha (Meyrick, 1883)
- Calicotis crucifera Meyrick, 1889
- Chersadaula ochrogastra Meyrick, 1923
- Coridomorpha stella Meyrick, 1914
- Corocosma memorabilis Meyrick, 1927
- Endrosis sarcitrella (Linnaeus, 1758) (white-shouldered house moth)
- Euchersadaula lathriopa (Meyrick, 1905)
- Euchersadaula tristis Philpott, 1926
- Eulechria zophoessa Meyrick, 1883
- Euthictis chloratma (Meyrick, 1916)
- Gymnobathra ambigua (Philpott, 1926)
- Gymnobathra bryaula Meyrick, 1905
- Gymnobathra caliginosa Philpott, 1927
- Gymnobathra calliploca Meyrick, 1883
- Gymnobathra callixyla (Meyrick, 1888)
- Gymnobathra cenchrias (Meyrick, 1909)
- Gymnobathra dinocosma (Meyrick, 1883)
- Gymnobathra flavidella (Walker, 1864)
- Gymnobathra hamatella (Walker, 1864)
- Gymnobathra hyetodes Meyrick, 1883
- Gymnobathra inaequata Philpott, 1928
- Gymnobathra jubata (Philpott, 1918)
- Gymnobathra levigata Philpott, 1928
- Gymnobathra omphalota Meyrick, 1888
- Gymnobathra origenes Meyrick, 1936
- Gymnobathra parca (Butler, 1877)
- Gymnobathra philadelpha Meyrick, 1883
- Gymnobathra primaria Philpott, 1928
- Gymnobathra rufopunctella Hudson, 1950
- Gymnobathra sarcoxantha Meyrick, 1883
- Gymnobathra tholodella Meyrick, 1883
- Hierodoris atychioides (Butler, 1877)
- Hierodoris bilineata (Salmon, 1948)
- Hierodoris callispora (Meyrick, 1912)
- Hierodoris electrica (Meyrick, 1889)
- Hierodoris eremita Philpott, 1930
- Hierodoris frigida Philpott, 1923
- Hierodoris gerontion Hoare, 2005
- Hierodoris huia Hoare, 2005
- Hierodoris illita (Felder & Rogenhofer, 1875)
- Hierodoris insignis Philpott, 1926
- Hierodoris iophanes Meyrick, 1912
- Hierodoris pachystegiae Hoare, 2005
- Hierodoris polita Hoare, 2005
- Hierodoris sesioides Hoare, 2005
- Hierodoris s-fractum Hoare, 2005
- Hierodoris squamea (Philpott, 1915)
- Hierodoris stella (Meyrick, 1914)
- Hierodoris torrida Hoare, 2005
- Hierodoris tygris Hoare, 2005
- Hofmannophila pseudospretella (Stainton, 1849) (brown house moth)
- Izatha acmonias Philpott, 1921
- Izatha apodoxa (Meyrick, 1888)
- Izatha attactella Walker, 1864
- Izatha austera (Meyrick, 1883)
- Izatha balanophora (Meyrick, 1897)
- Izatha blepharidota Hoare, 2010
- Izatha caustopa (Meyrick, 1892)
- Izatha churtoni Dugdale, 1988
- Izatha convulsella (Walker, 1864)
- Izatha copiosella (Walker, 1864)
- Izatha dasydisca Hoare, 2010
- Izatha dulcior Hoare, 2010
- Izatha epiphanes (Meyrick, 1883)
- Izatha florida Philpott, 1927
- Izatha gekkonella Hoare, 2010
- Izatha gibbsi Hoare, 2010
- Izatha haumu Hoare, 2010
- Izatha heroica Philpott, 1926
- Izatha hudsoni Dugdale, 1988
- Izatha huttonii (Butler, 1879)
- Izatha katadiktya Hoare, 2010
- Izatha lignyarcha Hoare, 2010
- Izatha manubriata Meyrick, 1923
- Izatha mesoschista Meyrick, 1931
- Izatha metadelta Meyrick, 1905
- Izatha minimira Hoare, 2010
- Izatha mira Philpott, 1913
- Izatha notodoxa Hoare, 2010
- Izatha oleariae Dugdale, 1971
- Izatha peroneanella (Walker, 1864)
- Izatha phaeoptila (Meyrick, 1905)
- Izatha picarella (Walker, 1864)
- Izatha prasophyta (Meyrick, 1883)
- Izatha psychra (Meyrick, 1883)
- Izatha quinquejacula Hoare, 2010
- Izatha rigescens Meyrick, 1929
- Izatha spheniscella Hoare, 2010
- Izatha taingo Hoare, 2010
- Izatha voluptuosa Hoare, 2010
- Izatha walkerae Hoare, 2010
- Lathicrossa leucocentra Meyrick, 1883
- Lathicrossa prophetica Meyrick, 1927
- Leptocroca amenena (Meyrick, 1888)
- Leptocroca aquilonaris Philpott, 1931
- Leptocroca asphaltis (Meyrick, 1911)
- Leptocroca lenita Philpott, 1931
- Leptocroca lindsayi Philpott, 1930
- Leptocroca porophora (Meyrick, 1929)
- Leptocroca sanguinolenta Meyrick, 1886
- Leptocroca scholaea (Meyrick, 1883)
- Leptocroca variabilis Philpott, 1926
- Leptocroca vinaria (Meyrick, 1914)
- Leptocroca xyrias Meyrick, 1931
- Locheutis fusca Philpott, 1930
- Locheutis pulla Philpott, 1928
- Locheutis vagata Meyrick, 1916
- Macronemata elaphia Meyrick, 1883
- Mermeristis ocneropis (Meyrick, 1936)
- Mermeristis spodiaea Meyrick, 1915
- Opsitycha squalidella (Meyrick, 1884)
- Prepalla austrina (Meyrick, 1914)
- Pachyrhabda antinoma Meyrick, 1910
- Phaeosaces apocrypta Meyrick, 1885
- Phaeosaces coarctatella (Walker, 1864)
- Phaeosaces compsotypa Meyrick, 1885
- Phaeosaces lindsayae (Philpott, 1928)
- Philobota chionoptera Meyrick, 1884
- Schiffermuelleria orthophanes (Meyrick, 1905)
- Scieropepla typhicola Meyrick, 1885
- Sphyrelata amotella (Walker, 1864)
- Stathmopoda albimaculata Philpott, 1931
- Stathmopoda aposema Meyrick, 1901
- Stathmopoda aristodoxa Meyrick, 1926
- Stathmopoda caminora Meyrick, 1890
- Stathmopoda campylocha Meyrick, 1889
- Stathmopoda cephalaea Meyrick, 1897
- Stathmopoda coracodes Meyrick, 1923
- Stathmopoda distincta Philpott, 1923
- Stathmopoda endotherma Meyrick, 1931
- Stathmopoda holochra Meyrick, 1889
- Stathmopoda horticola Dugdale, 1988
- Stathmopoda melanochra Meyrick, 1897
- Stathmopoda mysteriastis Meyrick, 1901
- Stathmopoda plumbiflua Meyrick, 1911
- Stathmopoda skelloni (Butler, 1880)
- Stathmopoda trimolybdias Meyrick, 1926
- Tachystola acroxantha (Meyrick, 1885)
- Tachystola hemisema (Meyrick, 1885)
- Thamnosara sublitella (Walker, 1864)
- Thylacosceles acridomima Meyrick, 1889
- Thylacosceles radians Philpott, 1918
- Tinearupa sorenseni Salmon & Bradley, 1956
- Tingena actinias (Meyrick, 1901)
- Tingena affinis (Philpott, 1926)
- Tingena afflicta (Philpott, 1926)
- Tingena aletis (Meyrick, 1905)
- Tingena amiculata (Philpott, 1926)
- Tingena anaema (Meyrick, 1883)
- Tingena ancogramma (Meyrick, 1919)
- Tingena apanthes (Meyrick, 1883)
- Tingena apertella (Walker, 1864)
- Tingena aphrontis (Meyrick, 1883)
- Tingena armigerella (Walker, 1864)
- Tingena aurata (Philpott, 1931)
- Tingena basella (Walker, 1863)
- Tingena berenice (Meyrick, 1929)
- Tingena brachyacma (Meyrick, 1909)
- Tingena chloradelpha (Meyrick, 1905)
- Tingena chloritis (Meyrick, 1883)
- Tingena chrysogramma (Meyrick, 1883)
- Tingena clarkei (Philpott, 1928)
- Tingena collitella (Walker, 1864)
- Tingena compsogramma (Meyrick, 1920)
- Tingena contextella (Walker, 1864)
- Tingena crotala (Meyrick, 1915)
- Tingena decora (Philpott, 1928)
- Tingena enodis (Philpott, 1927)
- Tingena epichalca (Meyrick, 1886)
- Tingena epimylia (Meyrick, 1883)
- Tingena eriphaea (Meyrick, 1914)
- Tingena eumenopa (Meyrick, 1926)
- Tingena falsiloqua (Meyrick, 1932)
- Tingena fenestrata (Philpott, 1926)
- Tingena grata (Philpott, 1927)
- Tingena griseata (Butler, 1877)
- Tingena hastata (Philpott, 1916)
- Tingena hemimochla (Meyrick, 1883)
- Tingena homodoxa (Meyrick, 1883)
- Tingena honesta (Philpott, 1929)
- Tingena honorata (Philpott, 1918)
- Tingena hoplodesma (Meyrick, 1883)
- Tingena horaea (Meyrick, 1883)
- Tingena idiogama (Meyrick, 1924)
- Tingena innotella (Walker, 1864)
- Tingena lassa (Philpott, 1930)
- Tingena laudata (Philpott, 1930)
- Tingena letharga (Meyrick, 1883)
- Tingena levicula (Philpott, 1930)
- Tingena loxotis (Meyrick, 1905)
- Tingena macarella (Meyrick, 1883)
- Tingena maranta (Meyrick, 1886)
- Tingena marcida (Philpott, 1927)
- Tingena melanamma (Meyrick, 1905)
- Tingena melinella (Felder & Rogenhofer, 1875)
- Tingena monodonta (Meyrick, 1911)
- Tingena morosa (Philpott, 1926)
- Tingena nycteris (Meyrick, 1890)
- Tingena ombrodella (Hudson, 1950)
- Tingena opaca (Philpott, 1926)
- Tingena ophiodryas (Meyrick, 1936)
- Tingena oporaea (Meyrick, 1883)
- Tingena oxyina (Meyrick, 1883)
- Tingena pallidula (Philpott, 1924)
- Tingena paratrimma (Meyrick, 1910)
- Tingena paula (Philpott, 1927)
- Tingena penthalea (Meyrick, 1905)
- Tingena perichlora (Meyrick, 1907)
- Tingena pharmactis (Meyrick, 1905)
- Tingena phegophylla (Meyrick, 1883)
- Tingena plagiatella (Walker, 1863)
- Tingena pronephela (Meyrick, 1907)
- Tingena robiginosa (Philpott, 1915)
- Tingena seclusa (Philpott, 1921)
- Tingena serena (Philpott, 1926)
- Tingena siderodeta (Meyrick, 1883)
- Tingena siderota (Meyrick, 1888)
- Tingena sinuosa (Philpott, 1928)
- Tingena tephrophanes (Meyrick, 1929)
- Tingena terrena (Philpott, 1926)
- Tingena thalerodes (Meyrick, 1916)
- Tingena vestita (Philpott, 1926)
- Tingena xanthodesma (Philpott, 1923)
- Tingena xanthomicta (Meyrick, 1916)
- Trachypepla amphileuca Meyrick, 1914
- Trachypepla anastrella Meyrick, 1883
- Trachypepla angularis (Philpott, 1929)
- Trachypepla aspidephora Meyrick, 1883
- Trachypepla conspicuella (Walker, 1864)
- Trachypepla contritella (Walker, 1864)
- Trachypepla cyphonias Meyrick, 1927
- Trachypepla euryleucota Meyrick, 1883
- Trachypepla festiva Philpott, 1930
- Trachypepla galaxias Meyrick, 1883
- Trachypepla hieropis Meyrick, 1892
- Trachypepla importuna Meyrick, 1914
- Trachypepla indolescens Meyrick, 1927
- Trachypepla ingenua Meyrick, 1911
- Trachypepla leucoplanetis Meyrick, 1883
- Trachypepla lichenodes Meyrick, 1883
- Trachypepla minuta Philpott, 1931
- Trachypepla nimbosa Philpott, 1930
- Trachypepla photinella (Meyrick, 1883)
- Trachypepla protochlora Meyrick, 1883
- Trachypepla roseata Philpott, 1923
- Trachypepla semilauta Philpott, 1918
- Trachypepla spartodeta Meyrick, 1883

=== Plutellidae ===
- Charixena iridoxa (Meyrick, 1916)
- Chrysorthenches argentea Dugdale, 1996
- Chrysorthenches drosochalca (Meyrick, 1905)
- Chrysorthenches glypharcha (Meyrick, 1919)
- Chrysorthenches halocarpi Dugdale, 1996
- Chrysorthenches phyllocladi Dugdale, 1996
- Chrysorthenches polita (Philpott, 1918)
- Chrysorthenches porphyritis (Meyrick, 1885)
- Chrysorthenches virgata (Philpott, 1920)
- Doxophyrtis hydrocosma Meyrick, 1914
- Hierodoris stellata Philpott, 1918
- Leuroperna sera (Meyrick, 1885)
- Orthenches chartularia Meyrick, 1924
- Orthenches chlorocoma Meyrick, 1885
- Orthenches dictyarcha Meyrick, 1927
- Orthenches disparilis Philpott, 1931
- Orthenches homerica (Salmon, 1956)
- Orthenches prasinodes Meyrick, 1885
- Orthenches saleuta Meyrick, 1913
- Orthenches semifasciata Philpott, 1915
- Orthenches septentrionalis Philpott, 1930
- Orthenches similis Philpott, 1924
- Orthenches vinitincta Philpott, 1917
- Phylacodes cauta Meyrick, 1905
- Plutella antiphona Meyrick, 1901
- Plutella psammochroa Meyrick, 1886
- Plutella xylostella (Linnaeus, 1758) (diamondback moth)
- Proditrix chionochloae Dugdale, 1987
- Proditrix gahniae Dugdale, 1987
- Proditrix megalynta Meyrick, 1915
- Proditrix tetragona (Hudson, 1918)
- Protosynaema eratopis Meyrick, 1885
- Protosynaema hymenopis Meyrick, 1935
- Protosynaema matutina Philpott, 1928
- Protosynaema quaestuosa Meyrick, 1924
- Protosynaema steropucha Meyrick, 1885

=== Psychidae ===
- Cebysa leucotelus Walker, 1854 (Australian bagmoth)
- Grypotheca horningae Dugdale, 1987
- Grypotheca pertinax Dugdale, 1987
- Grypotheca triangularis (Philpott, 1930)
- Lepidoscia heliochares (Meyrick, 1893)
- Lepidoscia protorna (Meyrick, 1893)
- Liothula omnivora Fereday, 1878
- Mallobathra abyssina (Clarke, 1934)
- Mallobathra angusta Philpott, 1928
- Mallobathra aphrosticha Meyrick, 1912
- Mallobathra campbellica Dugdale, 1971
- Mallobathra cana Philpott, 1927
- Mallobathra cataclysma Clarke, 1934
- Mallobathra crataea Meyrick, 1888
- Mallobathra fenwicki Philpott, 1924
- Mallobathra homalopa Meyrick, 1891
- Mallobathra lapidosa Meyrick, 1914
- Mallobathra memotuina Clarke, 1934
- Mallobathra metrosema Meyrick, 1888
- Mallobathra obscura Philpott, 1928
- Mallobathra perisseuta Meyrick, 1920
- Mallobathra petrodoxa (Meyrick, 1923)
- Mallobathra scoriota Meyrick, 1909
- Mallobathra strigulata Philpott, 1924
- Mallobathra subalpina Philpott, 1930
- Mallobathra tonnoiri Philpott, 1927
- Orophora unicolor (Butler, 1877)
- Reductoderces araneosa (Meyrick, 1914).
- Reductoderces aucklandica Dugdale, 1971
- Reductoderces cawthronella (Philpott, 1921)
- Reductoderces fuscoflava Salmon & Bradley, 1956
- Reductoderces illustris (Philpott, 1917)
- Reductoderces microphanes (Meyrick, 1888)
- Rhathamictis nocturna (Clarke, 1926)
- Rhathamictis perspersa Meyrick, 1924
- Scoriodyta conisalia Meyrick, 1888
- Scoriodyta dugdalei Haettenschwiler, 1989
- Scoriodyta patricki Haettenschwiler, 1989
- Scoriodyta rakautarensis Haettenschwiler, 1989
- Scoriodyta sereinae Haettenschwiler, 1989
- Scoriodyta suttonensis Haettenschwiler, 1989
- Scoriodyta virginella Haettenschwiler, 1989

=== Pterophoridae ===
- Amblyptilia aeolodes (Meyrick, 1902)
- Amblyptilia deprivatalis (Walker, 1864)
- Amblyptilia epotis (Meyrick, 1905)
- Amblyptilia falcatalis (Walker, 1864) (brown plume moth)
- Amblyptilia heliastis(Meyrick, 1885)
- Amblyptilia lithoxesta (Meyrick, 1885)
- Amblyptilia repletalis (Walker, 1864)
- Lantanophaga pusillidactyla (Walker, 1864)
- Oxyptilus pilosellae (Zeller, 1852)
- Platyptilia campsiptera Meyrick, 1907
- Platyptilia celidotus (Meyrick, 1885)
- Platyptilia charadrias (Meyrick, 1885)
- Platyptilia carduidactyla (Riley, 1869) (artichoke plume moth)
- Platyptilia hokowhitalis Hudson, 1939
- Platyptilia isodactylus (Zeller, 1852)
- Platyptilia isoterma Meyrick, 1909
- Platyptilia pulverulenta Philpott, 1923
- Pterophorus furcatalis (Walker, 1864)
- Pterophorus innotatalis Walker, 1864
- Pterophorus monospilalis (Walker, 1864)
- Sphenarches caffer (Zeller, 1852) (bottle gourd plume moth)
- Sphenarches anisodactylus (Walker, 1864)
- Stenoptilia orites (Meyrick, 1885)
- Stenoptilia zophodactyla (Duponchel, 1838)

=== Pyralidae ===
- Aglossa caprealis (Hübner, [1809])
- Aglossa pinguinalis (Linnaeus, 1758)
- Balanomis encyclia Meyrick, 1887
- Diasemiopsis ramburialis (Duponchel, 1834)
- Diplopseustis perieresalis (Walker, 1859)
- Dracaenura aegialitis Meyrick, 1910
- Endotricha mesenterialis (Walker, 1859)
- Endotricha pyrosalis Guenee, 1854
- Ephestiopsis oenobarella (Meyrick, 1879)
- Eranistis pandora Meyrick, 1910
- Herpetogramma licarsisalis (Walker, 1859) (grass webworm; tropical grass webworm)
- Hymenia recurvalis (Fabricius, 1775)
- Pyralis farinalis (Linnaeus, 1758) (meal moth)
- Scoparia acharis Meyrick, 1884
- Scoparia albafascicula Salmon, 1956
- Scoparia animosa Meyrick, 1914
- Scoparia apheles (Meyrick, 1884)
- Scoparia asaleuta Meyrick, 1907
- Scoparia astragalota Meyrick, 1885
- Scoparia augastis Meyrick, 1907
- Scoparia autochroa Meyrick, 1907
- Scoparia autumna Philpott, 1927
- Scoparia caesia Philpott, 1926
- Scoparia caliginosa Philpott, 1918
- Scoparia chalicodes Meyrick, 1884
- Scoparia cinefacta Philpott, 1926
- Scoparia claranota Howes, 1946
- Scoparia clavata Philpott, 1912
- Scoparia contexta Philpott, 1931
- Scoparia crepuscula Salmon, 1946
- Scoparia cyameuta (Meyrick, 1884)
- Scoparia declivis Philpott, 1918
- Scoparia diphtheralis Walker, 1866
- Scoparia dryphactis Meyrick, 1911
- Scoparia ejuncida Knaggs, 1867
- Scoparia encapna Meyrick, 1888
- Scoparia ergatis Meyrick, 1885
- Scoparia exilis Knaggs, 1867
- Scoparia falsa Philpott, 1924
- Scoparia famularis Philpott, 1930
- Scoparia fimbriata Philpott, 1917
- Scoparia fragosa Meyrick, 1910
- Scoparia fumata Philpott, 1915
- Scoparia gracilis Philpott, 1924
- Scoparia halopis Meyrick, 1909
- Scoparia harpalea (Meyrick, 1885)
- Scoparia humilialis Hudson, 1950
- Scoparia illota Philpott, 1919
- Scoparia indistinctalis Walker, 1863
- Scoparia limatula Philpott, 1930
- Scoparia lychnophanes Meyrick, 1927
- Scoparia minusculalis Walker, 1866
- Scoparia molifera Meyrick, 1926
- Scoparia monochroma Salmon, 1946
- Scoparia niphospora (Meyrick, 1884)
- Scoparia nomeutis Meyrick, 1885
- Scoparia pallidula Philpott, 1928
- Scoparia panopla Meyrick, 1884
- Scoparia parachalca Meyrick, 1901
- Scoparia parca Philpott, 1928
- Scoparia parmifera Meyrick, 1909
- Scoparia pascoella Philpott, 1920
- Scoparia petrina Meyrick, 1885
- Scoparia phalerias Meyrick, 1905
- Scoparia pura Philpott, 1924
- Scoparia rotuella Felder & Rogenhofer, 1875
- Scoparia scripta Philpott, 1918
- Scoparia sideraspis Meyrick, 1905
- Scoparia sinuata Philpott, 1930
- Scoparia subita Philpott, 1912
- Scoparia sylvestris Clarke, 1926
- Scoparia tetracycla Meyrick, 1885
- Scoparia trapezophora Meyrick, 1885
- Scoparia triscelis Meyrick, 1909
- Scoparia tuicana Clarke, 1926
- Scoparia turneri Philpott, 1928
- Scoparia ustimacula Felder & Rogenhofer, 1875
- Scoparia valenternota Howes, 1946
- Scoparia vulpecula Meyrick, 1927
- Stericta carbonalis (Guenée, 1854)

==== Phycitinae ====
- Achroia grisella (Fabricius, 1794) (lesser wax moth)
- Arcola malloi (Linnaeus, 1758)
- Cadra cautella (Walker, 1863) (almond moth; tropical warehouse moth)
- Crocydopora cinigerella (Walker, 1866)
- Cryptoblabes gnidiella (Millière, 1867) (honeydew moth; Christmasberry moth)
- Delogenes limodoxa Meyrick, 1918
- Ephestia elutella (Hübner, 1796) (cacao moth; tobacco moth; warehouse moth)
- Ephestia kuehniella Zeller, 1879 (Mediterranean flour moth; Indian flour moth; mill moth)
- Ephestiopsis oenobarella (Meyrick, 1879)
- Etiella behrii (Zeller, 1848)
- Galleria mellonella (Linnaeus, 1758) (greater wax moth; honeycomb moth)
- Gauna aegusalis (Walker, 1859)
- Homoeosoma anaspila Meyrick, 1901
- Indomalayia flabellifera (Hampson, 1896)
- Morosaphycita oculiferella (Meyrick, 1879)
- Oligochroa oculiferella (Meyrick, 1879)
- Patagoniodes farinaria (Turner, 1904)
- Pempelia genistella (Duponchel, 1836)
- Plodia interpunctella (Hübner, 1813) (Indian meal moth; pantry moth)
- Ptyomaxia trigonogramma (Turner, 1947)
- Sporophyla oenospora (Meyrick, 1897)

=== Roeslerstammiidae ===
- Dolichernis chloroleuca Meyrick, 1891
- Vanicela disjunctella Walker, 1864

=== Saturniidae ===
- Actias selene (Hübner, 1807) (Indian moon moth; Indian luna moth)
- Antheraea pernyi (Guérin-Méneville, 1855) (Chinese (oak) tussah moth; temperate tussah moth)
- Caligula simla (Westwood, 1847)
- Hyalophora cecropia (Linnaeus, 1758) (cecropia moth)
- Opodiphthera eucalypti (Scott, 1864) (emperor gum moth)
- Samia cynthia (Drury, 1773) (ailanthus silkmoth)

=== Scythrididae ===
- Scythris epistrota (Meyrick, 1889)
- Scythris nigra Philpott, 1931
- Scythris niphozela Meyrick, 1931
- Scythris triatma Meyrick, 1935

=== Sesiidae ===
- Synanthedon tipuliformis (Clerck, 1759) (currant clearwing)

=== Sphingidae ===
- Agrius convolvuli (Linnaeus, 1758) (convolvulus hawk-moth)
- Cizara ardeniae (Lewin, 1805) (coprosma hawk-moth)
- Daphnis placida placida (Walker, 1856)
- Hippotion celerio (Linnaeus, 1758) (vine hawk-moth; silver-striped hawk-moth)

=== Thyatiridae ===
- Thyatira batis (Linnaeus, 1758) (peach blossom)

=== Thyrididae ===
- Morova subfasciata Walker, 1865

=== Tineidae ===
- Amphixystis hapsimacha Meyrick, 1901
- Archyala culta Philpott, 1931
- Archyala lindsayi (Philpott, 1927)
- Archyala opulenta Philpott, 1926
- Archyala paraglypta Meyrick, 1889
- Archyala pentazyga Meyrick, 1915
- Archyala terranea (Butler, 1879)
- Astrogenes chrysograpta Meyrick, 1921
- Astrogenes insignita Philpott, 1930
- Bascantis sirenica Meyrick, 1914
- Crypsitricha agriopa (Meyrick, 1888)
- Crypsitricha generosa Philpott, 1926
- Crypsitricha mesotypa (Meyrick, 1888)
- Crypsitricha pharotoma (Meyrick, 1888)
- Crypsitricha roseata Meyrick, 1913
- Crypsitricha stereota (Meyrick, 1914)
- Dryadaula castanea Philpott, 1915
- Dryadaula myrrhina Meyrick, 1905
- Dryadaula pactolia Meyrick, 1901
- Dryadaula terpsichorella (Busck, 1910) (dancing moth)
- Endophthora omogramma Meyrick, 1888
- Endophthora pallacopis Meyrick, 1918
- Endophthora rubiginella Hudson, 1939
- Endophthora tylogramma Meyrick, 1924
- Erechthias acrodina (Meyrick, 1912)
- Erechthias capnitis (Turner, 1918)
- Erechthias charadrota Meyrick, 1880
- Erechthias chasmatias Meyrick, 1880
- Erechthias chionodira Meyrick, 1880
- Erechthias crypsimima (Meyrick, 1920)
- Erechthias decoranda (Meyrick, 1925)
- Erechthias exospila (Meyrick, 1901)
- Erechthias externella (Walker, 1864)
- Erechthias flavistriata (Walsingham, 1907)
- Erechthias fulguritella (Walker, 1863)
- Erechthias hemiclistra (Meyrick, 1911)
- Erechthias indicans Meyrick, 1923
- Erechthias lychnopa Meyrick, 1927
- Erechthias macrozyga Meyrick, 1916
- Erechthias stilbella (Doubleday, 1843)
- Erechthias terminella (Walker, 1863)
- Eschatotypa derogatella (Walker, 1863)
- Eschatotypa halosparta (Meyrick, 1919)
- Eschatotypa melichrysa Meyrick, 1880
- Eugennaea laquearia (Meyrick, 1914)
- Habrophila compseuta Meyrick, 1889
- Lindera tessellatella Blanchard, 1852
- Lysiphragma epixyla Meyrick, 1888
- Lysiphragma howesii Quail, 1901
- Lysiphragma mixochlora Meyrick, 1888
- Monopis argillacea Meyrick, 1893
- Monopis crocicapitella Clemens, 1859
- Monopis dimorphella Dugdale, 1971
- Monopis ethelella Newman, 1856
- Monopis ornithias Meyrick, 1888
- Monopis typhlopa Meyrick, 1925
- Nemapogon granella (Linnaeus, 1758) (European grain moth)
- Niditinea fuscella (Linnaeus, 1758) (brown-dotted clothes moth)
- Oinophila v-flava (Haworth, 1828)
- Opogona aurisquamosa Swezey, 1913
- Opogona comptella Walker, 1864
- Opogona omoscopa Meyrick, 1893
- Parochmastis hilderi (Bradley, 1956)
- Petasactis technica (Meyrick, 1888)
- Proterodesma byrsopola Meyrick, 1909
- Proterodesma chathamica Dugdale, 1971
- Proterodesma turbotti Salmon & Bradley, 1956
- Prothinodes grammocosma Meyrick, 1888
- Prothinodes lutata Meyrick, 1914
- Sagephora exsanguis Philpott, 1918
- Sagephora felix Meyrick, 1914
- Sagephora jocularis Philpott, 1926
- Sagephora phortegella Meyrick, 1888
- Sagephora steropastis Meyrick, 1891
- Sagephora subcarinata Meyrick, 1931
- Tephrosara cimmeria (Meyrick, 1914)
- Thallostoma eurygrapha Meyrick, 1913
- Tinea accusatrix Meyrick, 1916
- Tinea aetherea Clarke, 1926
- Tinea argodelta Meyrick, 1915
- Tinea astraea Meyrick, 1911
- Tinea atmogramma Meyrick, 1927
- Tinea belonota Meyrick, 1888
- Tinea conferta Meyrick, 1914
- Tinea conspecta Philpott, 1931
- Tinea dicharacta Meyrick, 1893 (sensu Meyrick, 1911)
- Tinea dividua Philpott, 1928
- Tinea dubiella Stainton, 1859
- Tinea fagicola Meyrick, 1921
- Tinea furcillata Philpott, 1930
- Tinea margaritis Meyrick, 1914
- Tinea mochlota Meyrick, 1888
- Tinea munita Meyrick, 1932
- Tinea pallescentella Stainton, 1851
- Tinea pellionella Linnaeus, 1758 (case-bearing clothes moth)
- Tinea sphenocosma Meyrick, 1919
- Tinea texta Meyrick, 1931
- Tineola bisselliella (Hummel, 1823) (common clothes moth; webbing clothes moth, clothing moth)
- Trichophaga tapetzella (Linnaeus, 1758) (tapestry moth; carpet moth)
- Trithamnora certella (Walker, 1863)

=== Tortricidae ===
- Acleris comariana (Lienig & Zeller, 1846) (strawberry tortrix)
- Acroclita discariana Philpott, 1930
- Apoctena clarkei Philpott, 1930
- Apoctena conditana (Walker, 1863)
- Apoctena fastigata (Philpott, 1916)
- Apoctena flavescens (Butler, 1877)
- Apoctena orthocopa Meyrick, 1924b
- Apoctena orthropis (Meyrick, 1901)
- Apoctena persecta (Meyrick, 1914)
- Apoctena pictoriana (Felder & Rogenhofer, 1875)
- Apoctena spatiosa (Philpott, 1923)
- Apoctena syntona laqueorum Dugdale, 1971
- Apoctena syntona syntona Meyrick, 1909
- Apoctena taipana (Felder & Rogenhofer, 1875)
- Apoctena tigris (Philpott, 1914)
- Argyroploce chlorosaris Meyrick, 1914
- Ascerodes prochlora Meyrick, 1905
- Bactra noteraula Walsingham, 1907
- Bactra optanias Meyrick, 1911
- Capua intractana (Walker, 1869)
- Capua semiferana (Walker, 1863) (oak leafroller)
- Catamacta alopecana (Meyrick, 1885)
- Catamacta gavisana (Walker, 1863)
- Catamacta lotinana (Meyrick, 1882)
- Catamacta rureana (Felder & Rogenhofer, 1875)
- Cnephasia holorphna Meyrick, 1911
- Cnephasia incessana (Walker, 1863)
- Cnephasia jactatana (Walker, 1863) (black-lyre leafroller)
- Cnephasia latomana (Meyrick, 1885)
- Cnephasia melanophaea Meyrick, 1927
- Cnephasia microbathra Meyrick, 1911
- Cnephasia ochnosema Meyrick, 1936
- Cnephasia paterna Philpott, 1926
- Crocidosema plebejana Zeller, 1847
- Cryptaspasma querula (Meyrick, 1912)
- Ctenopseustis filicis Dugdale, 1990
- Ctenopseustis fraterna Philpott, 1930
- Ctenopseustis herana (Felder & Rogenhofer, 1875) (brownheaded leafroller)
- Ctenopseustis obliquana (Walker, 1863) (brownheaded leafroller)
- Ctenopseustis servana (Walker, 1863)
- Cydia pomonella (Linnaeus, 1759) (codling moth)
- Cydia succedana (Denis & Schiffermueller, 1776)
- Dipterina imbriferana Meyrick, 1881
- Ecclitica hemiclista (Meyrick, 1905)
- Ecclitica philpotti (Dugdale, 1978)
- Ecclitica torogramma (Meyrick, 1897)
- Ecclitica triorthota (Meyrick, 1927)
- Epalxiphora axenana Meyrick, 1881
- Epichorista abdita Philpott, 1924
- Epichorista allogama (Meyrick, 1914)
- Epichorista aspistana (Meyrick, 1882)
- Epichorista crypsidora (Meyrick, 1909)
- Epichorista elephantina (Meyrick, 1885)
- Epichorista emphanes (Meyrick, 1901)
- Epichorista eribola (Meyrick, 1889)
- Epichorista fraudulenta (Philpott, 1928)
- Epichorista hemionana (Meyrick, 1882)
- Epichorista lindsayi Philpott, 1928
- Epichorista mimica Philpott, 1930
- Epichorista siriana (Meyrick, 1881)
- Epichorista tenebrosa Philpott, 1917
- Epichorista zatrophana (Meyrick, 1882)
- Epiphyas postvittana (Walker, 1863) (light brown apple moth)
- Ericodesma aerodana (Meyrick, 1881)
- Ericodesma argentosa (Philpott, 1924)
- Ericodesma cuneata (Clarke, 1926)
- Ericodesma melanosperma (Meyrick, 1916)
- Ericodesma scruposa (Philpott, 1924)
- Eurythecta curva Philpott, 1918
- Eurythecta eremana (Meyrick, 1885)
- Eurythecta leucothrinca (Meyrick, 1931)
- Eurythecta loxias (Meyrick, 1888)
- Eurythecta phaeoxyla Meyrick, 1938
- Eurythecta robusta (Butler, 1877)
- Eurythecta zelaea Meyrick, 1905
- Gelophaula aenea (Butler, 1877)
- Gelophaula aridella Clarke, 1934
- Gelophaula lychnophanes (Meyrick, 1916)
- Gelophaula palliata (Philpott, 1914)
- Gelophaula praecipitalis Meyrick, 1934
- Gelophaula siraea (Meyrick, 1885)
- Gelophaula tributaria (Philpott, 1913)
- Gelophaula trisulca (Meyrick, 1916)
- Gelophaula vana Philpott, 1928
- Grapholita molesta (Busck, 1916) (Oriental fruit moth; peach moth)
- Harmologa amplexana (Zeller, 1875)
- Harmologa columella Meyrick, 1927
- Harmologa festiva Philpott, 1915
- Harmologa oblongana (Walker, 1863)
- Harmologa petrias Meyrick, 1901
- Harmologa pontifica Meyrick, 1911
- Harmologa reticularis Philpott, 1915
- Harmologa sanguinea Philpott, 1915
- Harmologa scoliastis (Meyrick, 1907)
- Harmologa sisyrana Meyrick, 1882
- Harmologa speciosa (Philpott, 1927)
- Harmologa toroterma Hudson, 1925
- Hendecasticha aethaliana Meyrick, 1881
- Holocola charopa (Meyrick, 1888)
- Holocola dolopaea (Meyrick, 1905)
- Holocola emplasta (Meyrick, 1901)
- Holocola parthenia (Meyrick, 1888)
- Holocola zopherana (Meyrick, 1881)
- Isotenes miserana (Walker, 1863)
- Leucotenes coprosmae (Dugdale, 1990)
- Lopharcha insolita (Dugdale, 1966)
- Maoritenes cyclobathra (Meyrick, 1907)
- Maoritenes modesta (Philpott, 1930)
- Merophyas divulsana (Walker, 1863)
- Merophyas leucaniana (Walker, 1863)
- Merophyas paraloxa (Meyrick, 1907)
- Ochetarcha miraculosa (Meyrick, 1917)
- Parienia mochlophorana (Meyrick, 1883)
- Philocryptica polypodii (Watt, 1921)
- Planotortrix avicenniae Dugdale, 1990
- Planotortrix excessana (Walker, 1863) (greenheaded leafroller)
- Planotortrix flammea (Salmon, 1956)
- Planotortrix notophaea (Turner, 1926)
- Planotortrix octo Dugdale, 1990
- Planotortrix octoides Dugdale, 1990
- Planotortrix puffini Dugdale, 1990
- Polychrosis meliscia Meyrick, 1910
- Prothelymna antiquana (Walker, 1863)
- Prothelymna niphostrota (Meyrick, 1907)
- Protithona fugitivana Meyrick, 1882
- Protithona potamias Meyrick, 1909
- Pyrgotis arcuata (Philpott, 1915)
- Pyrgotis calligypsa (Meyrick, 1926)
- Pyrgotis chrysomela (Meyrick, 1914)
- Pyrgotis consentiens Philpott, 1916
- Pyrgotis eudorana Meyrick, 1885
- Pyrgotis humilis Philpott, 1930
- Pyrgotis plagiatana (Walker, 1863)
- Pyrgotis plinthoglypta Meyrick, 1892
- Pyrgotis pyramidias Meyrick, 1901
- Pyrgotis transfixa (Meyrick, 1924)
- Pyrgotis zygiana Meyrick, 1882
- Sorensenata agilitata Salmon & Bradley, 1956
- Strepsicrates ejectana (Walker, 1863)
- Strepsicrates infensa (Meyrick, 1911)
- Strepsicrates macropetana (Meyrick, 1881) (eucalyptus leafroller)
- Strepsicrates melanotreta (Meyrick, 1910)
- Strepsicrates sideritis (Meyrick, 1905)
- Tortrix antichroa Meyrick, 1919
- Tortrix demiana Meyrick, 1882
- Tortrix fervida (Meyrick, 1901)
- Tortrix incendiaria (Meyrick, 1923)
- Tortrix molybditis Meyrick, 1907
- Tortrix sphenias (Meyrick, 1909)
- Tortrix zestodes Meyrick, 1924
- Zomariana doxasticana (Meyrick, 1881)

=== Yponomeutidae ===
- Kessleria copidota (Meyrick, 1889)
- Prays nephelomima Meyrick, 1907 (citrus flower moth)
- Zelleria maculata Philpott, 1930
- Zelleria porphyraula Meyrick, 1927
- Zelleria rorida Philpott, 1918
- Zelleria sphenota (Meyrick, 1889)

=== Zygaenidae ===
- Artona martini Efetov, 1997

=== Indeterminate family ===
- Cadmogenes literata Meyrick, 1923 (Presently placed in the family Plutellidae)
- Lysiphragma argentaria Salmon, 1948 (Presently placed in the family Tineidae)
- Titanomis sisyrota Meyrick, 1888 (Not placed in any family)

=== Unlikely to be present in New Zealand ===
- Cateristis eustyla Meyrick, 1889

== See also ==
- Fauna of New Zealand
- Environment of New Zealand
