= John S. Dugdale =

New Zealand entomologist (1934–2020)

John Stewart Dugdale
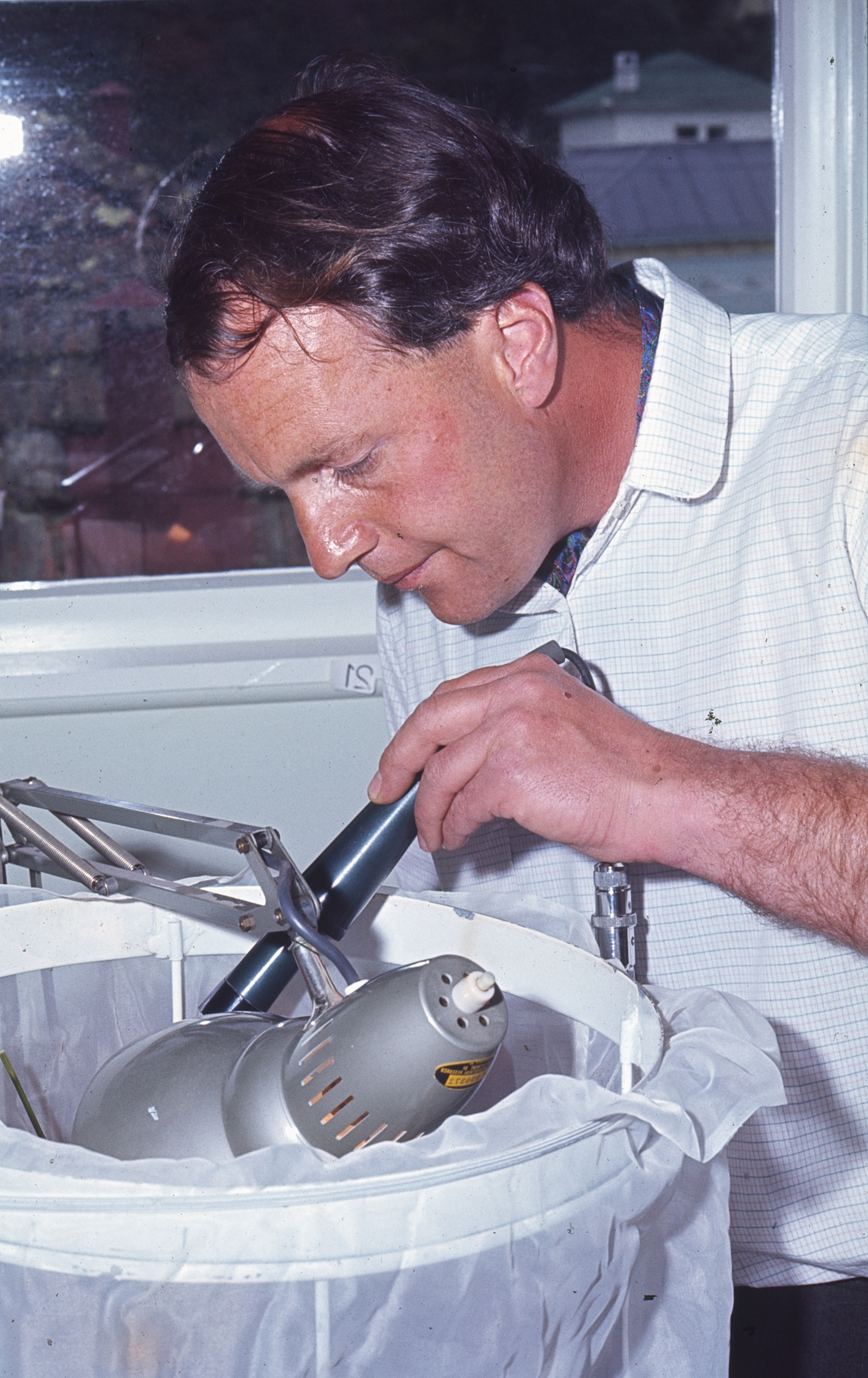
- Born: John Stewart Dugdale; 5 April 1934; Christchurch, New Zealand
- Died: 4 September 2020 (aged 86); Nelson, New Zealand
- Awards: Fellow of the Entomological Society of New Zealand
- Scientific career
- Fields: Entomologist

John Stewart Dugdale (5 April 1934 – 4 September 2020) was a New Zealand entomologist known for his contributions to knowledge about New Zealand lepidoptera, as well as tachinid flies and cicadas. He published extensively and his 1988 publication on New Zealand moths and butterflies, Lepidoptera - annotated catalogue, and keys to family-group taxa, is still regarded as a landmark publication as it updated the classification of New Zealand Lepidoptera species known at that point in time. He has had two genera and numerous species named in his honour.
