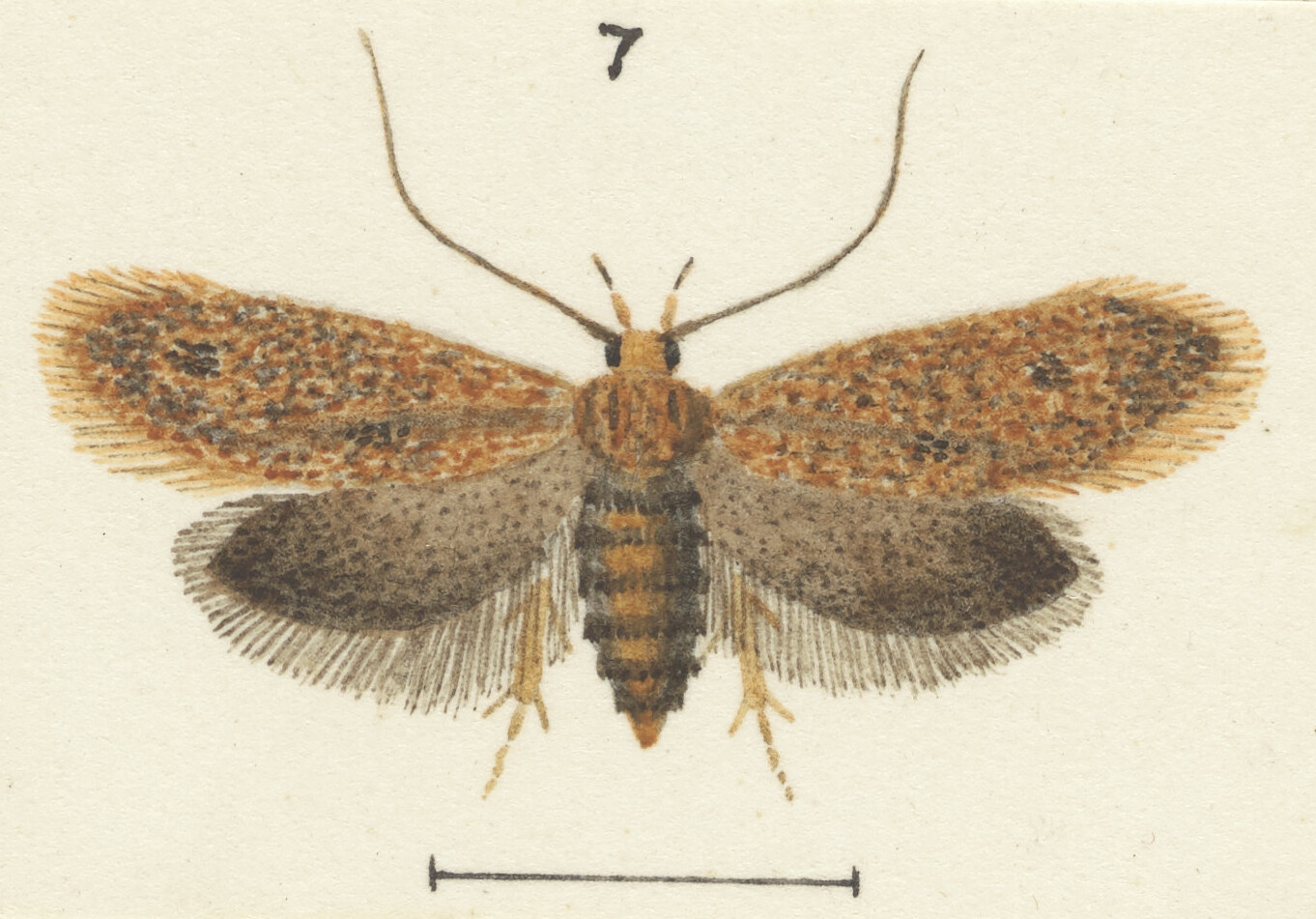

Scientific classification
- Kingdom: Animalia
- Phylum: Arthropoda
- Class: Insecta
- Order: Lepidoptera
- Family: Oecophoridae
- Genus: Locheutis
- Species: L. pulla

Binomial name
- Locheutis pulla Philpott, 1928

= Locheutis pulla =

Species of moth

Locheutis pulla is a moth of the family Oecophoridae. It was described by Philpott in 1928. It is found in New Zealand.
