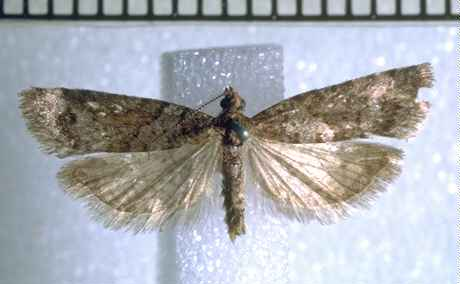
- Male holotype

Scientific classification
- Kingdom: Animalia
- Phylum: Arthropoda
- Class: Insecta
- Order: Lepidoptera
- Family: Tortricidae
- Genus: Cnephasia
- Species: C. ochnosema

Binomial name
- Cnephasia ochnosema Meyrick, 1936

= Cnephasia ochnosema =

Species of moth endemic to New Zealand

Cnephasia ochnosema is a species of moth in the family Tortricidae first described by Edward Meyrick in 1936. However the placement of this species within the genus Cnephasia is in doubt. As a result, this species may be referred to as Cnephasia (s.l.) ochnosema. This species is endemic to New Zealand.
