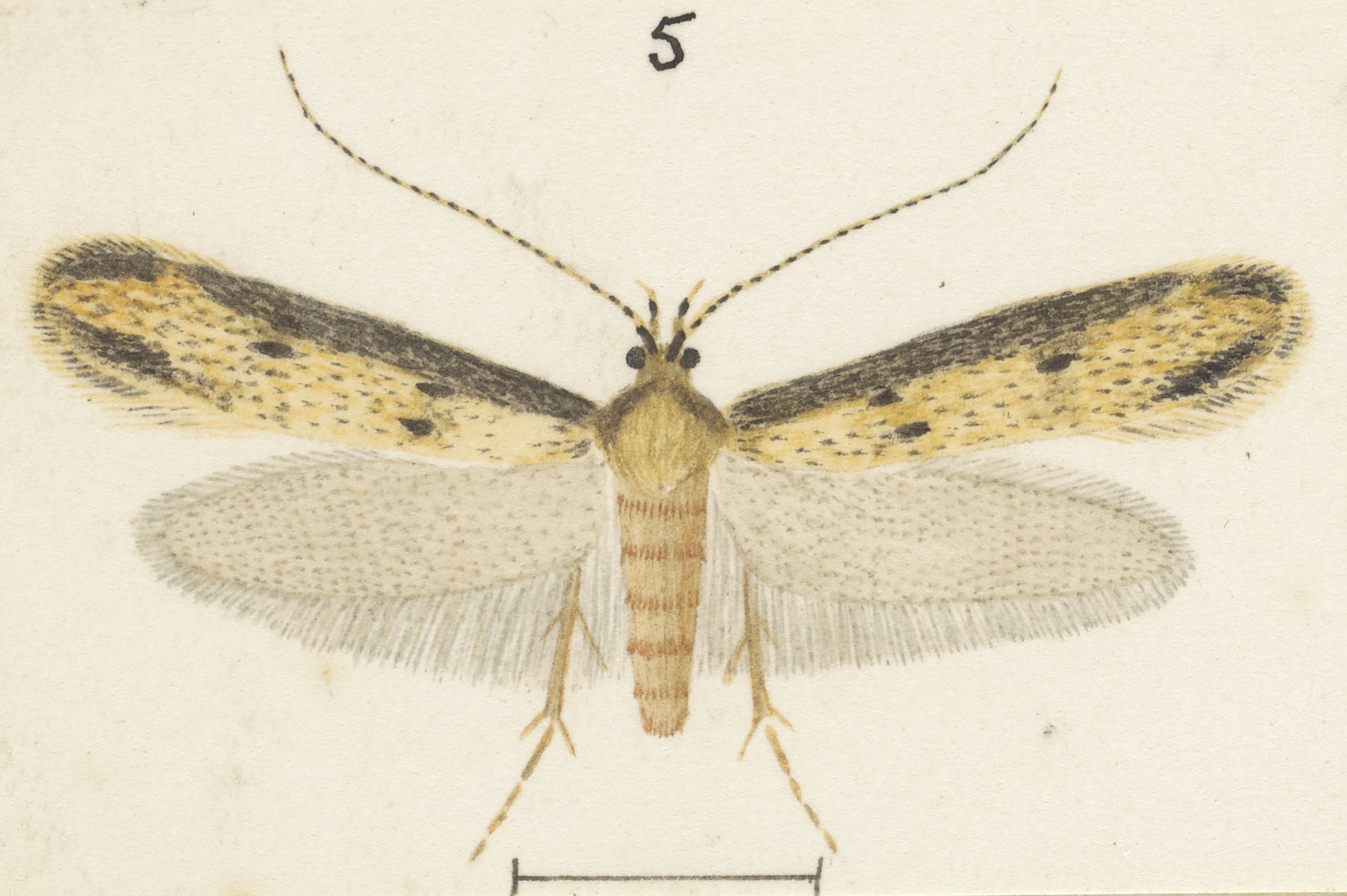

Scientific classification
- Kingdom: Animalia
- Phylum: Arthropoda
- Class: Insecta
- Order: Lepidoptera
- Family: Oecophoridae
- Genus: Gymnobathra
- Species: G. jubata

Binomial name
- Gymnobathra jubata (Philpott, 1918)

Synonyms
- Dolichernis jubata Philpott, 1918

= Gymnobathra jubata =

Species of moth

Gymnobathra jubata is a moth of the family Oecophoridae. It was described by Philpott in 1918. It is found in New Zealand.
