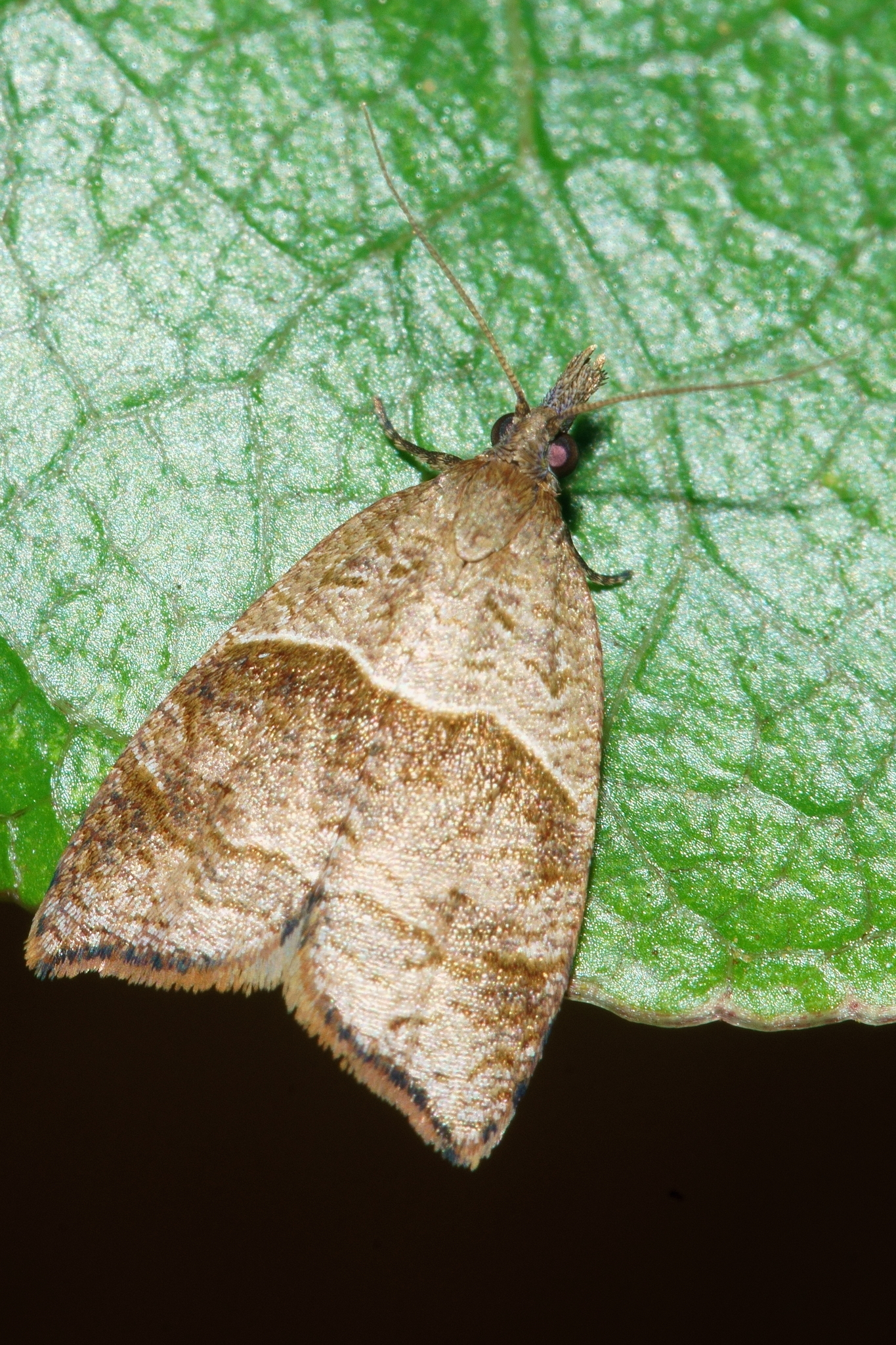

Scientific classification
- Kingdom: Animalia
- Phylum: Arthropoda
- Clade: Pancrustacea
- Class: Insecta
- Order: Lepidoptera
- Family: Tortricidae
- Genus: Cnephasia
- Species: C. incessana

Binomial name
- Cnephasia incessana (Walker, 1863)

Synonyms
- Teras incessana Walker, 1863; Arotrophora incessana (Walker, 1863); Dipterina incessana (Walker, 1863)

= Cnephasia incessana =

Species of moth endemic to New Zealand

Cnephasia incessana, also known as the brown-shouldered bell moth, is a species of moth in the family Tortricidae. However the placement of this species within the genus Cnephasia is in doubt. This species is therefore also known Cnephasia (s.l.) incessana.

It was first described by Francis Walker in 1863. C. incessana is endemic to New Zealand. It can be found throughout the country and is regarded as common. It inhabits native bush and frequently occurs on the edges of wooded areas. Adults are most commonly observed on the wing from October until December. They are attracted to light. It has been hypothesised that this species only has one brood a year.

== Taxonomy ==
This species was first described by Francis Walker in 1863 and originally named Teras incessana. In 1881 Edward Meyrick placed this species in the genus Arotrophora. Subsequently in 1883 Meyrick placed this species in the genus Dipterina. In 1911 Meyrick again considered this species and placed it within the genus Cnephasia. George Hudson followed this placement in 1928 when he described and illustrated this species under that name in his book The butterflies and moths of New Zealand. Also in 1928 Alfred Philpott studied the male genitalia of this species. However the placement of this species within the genus Cnephasia is in doubt. As a result, this species is also referred to as Cnephasia (s.l.) incessana. The male lectotype, collected in Nelson by Thomas R. Oxley, is held at the Natural History Museum, London.

== Description ==
Illustration of female by Hudson.

Walker described the male of this species as follows:

Male. Dark cinereous, paler beneath. Palpi porrect, a little longer than the breadth of the head; second joint thickly fringed ; third elongate-conical, about one-fourth of the length of the second. Antennae setulose, pubescent. Abdomen cinereous, extending a little beyond the hind wings. Wings with numerous minute transverse brownish streaks. Fore wings rectangular at the tips, with four irregular brown more or less complete transverse lines; first line much broader than the others, bordered with pale cinereous ; costa and exterior border slightly convex, the latter slightly oblique. Hind wings pale cinereous. Length of the body 31/2 lines; of the wings 9 lines.

Hudson described this species as follows:

The expansion of the wings is slightly over 3/4 inch. The fore-wings have the termen slightly curved and oblique; the basal third is rather pale reddish-brown thickly speckled with dull white and traversed by a few short dark brown stripes; the outer edge of the basal patch is clearly defined by a fine, slightly-curved white line; this is followed by a broad, rich brown central shading; there is a triangular shaded patch of dark brown on the costa before the apex; the terminal portion of the wing is thickly speckled with dull white and crossed by numerous fine broken brown, transverse lines; the cilia have a black basal line. The hind-wings are pale brownish-grey faintly spotted with darker grey.

Live specimen showing the central stripe on the forewings.

Meyrick stated that this species is distinctive as a result of its fuscous colouring and the straight perpendicular central stripe of colour running across the forewings. Hudson pointed out that there is little variation in specimens beyond some being a warmer brown colour. He stated that the colouration of the adults is highly protective as it ensures the moth is well camouflaged when resting amongst dead leaves or on the ground.

== Distribution ==
This species is endemic to New Zealand. It is found throughout the country and is regarded as common.

== Habitat ==
This species inhabits native bush and frequently occurs on the edges of wooded areas.

== Behaviour ==
Adults are commonly observed on the wing from October until December. They are attracted to light. David E. Gaskin hypothesised that this species had only one brood a year.
