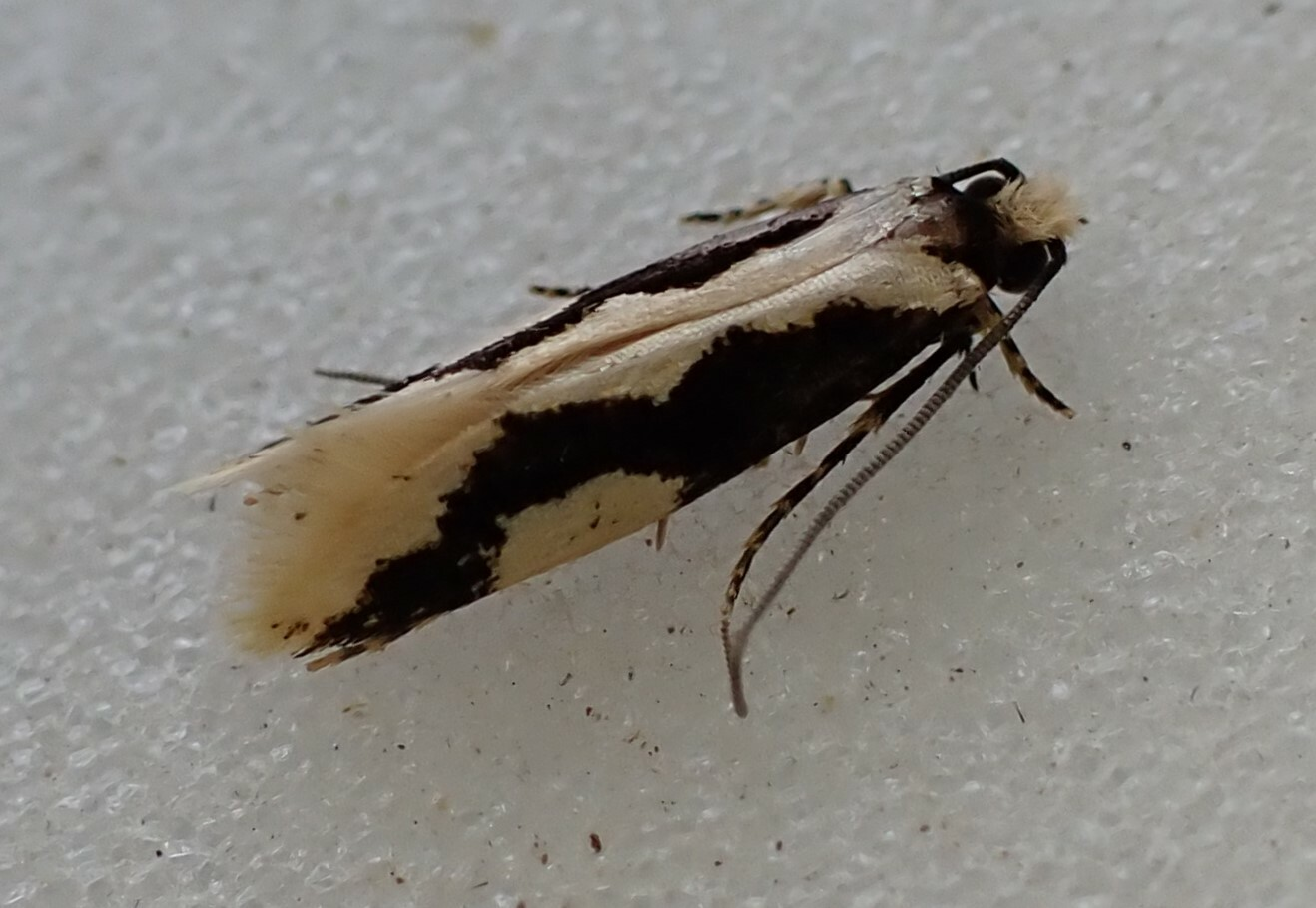

Scientific classification
- Kingdom: Animalia
- Phylum: Arthropoda
- Clade: Pancrustacea
- Class: Insecta
- Order: Lepidoptera
- Family: Tineidae
- Genus: Thallostoma; Meyrick, 1913
- Species: T. eurygrapha

Binomial name
- Thallostoma eurygrapha Meyrick, 1913

= Thallostoma =

Genus of moths

Thallostoma is a genus of moths belonging to the family Tineidae. It contains only one species, Thallostoma eurygrapha, which is endemic to New Zealand.

== Description of species ==
The wingspan is 18–19 mm. The forewings are elongate and dark purplish-fuscous with whitish-ochreous markings. The hindwings are grey.
