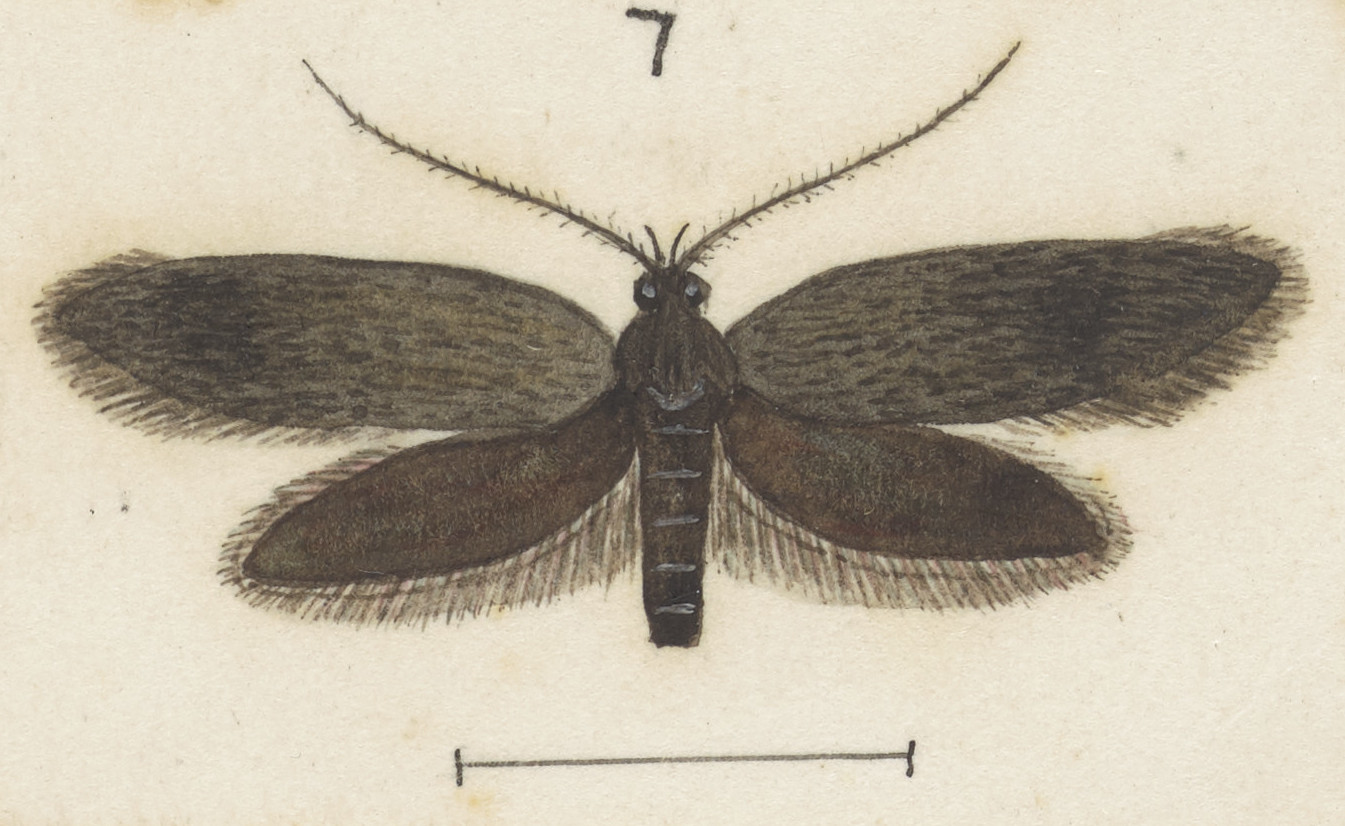
- Illustration of male

Scientific classification
- Kingdom: Animalia
- Phylum: Arthropoda
- Class: Insecta
- Order: Lepidoptera
- Family: Oecophoridae
- Genus: Locheutis
- Species: L. vagata

Binomial name
- Locheutis vagata Meyrick, 1916

= Locheutis vagata =

Species of moth

Locheutis vagata is a moth of the family Oecophoridae. It was described by Edward Meyrick in 1916. It is found in New Zealand.
