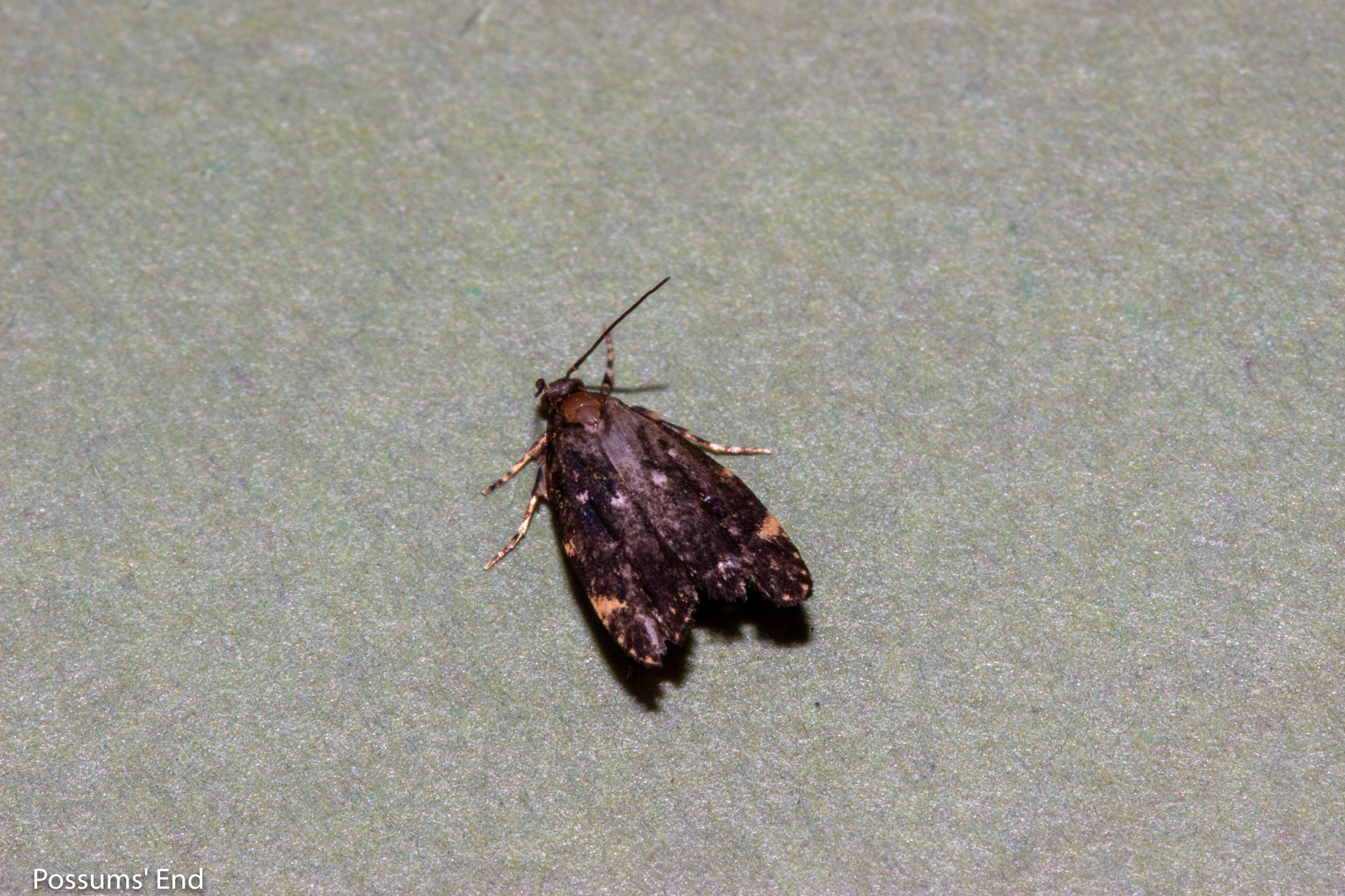

Scientific classification
- Kingdom: Animalia
- Phylum: Arthropoda
- Class: Insecta
- Order: Lepidoptera
- Family: Oecophoridae
- Genus: Lathicrossa
- Species: L. leucocentra

Binomial name
- Lathicrossa leucocentra Meyrick, 1883

= Lathicrossa leucocentra =

Species of moth endemic to New Zealand

Lathicrossa leucocentra is a species of moth in the family Oecophoridae first described by Edward Meyrick in 1883. It is endemic to New Zealand.
