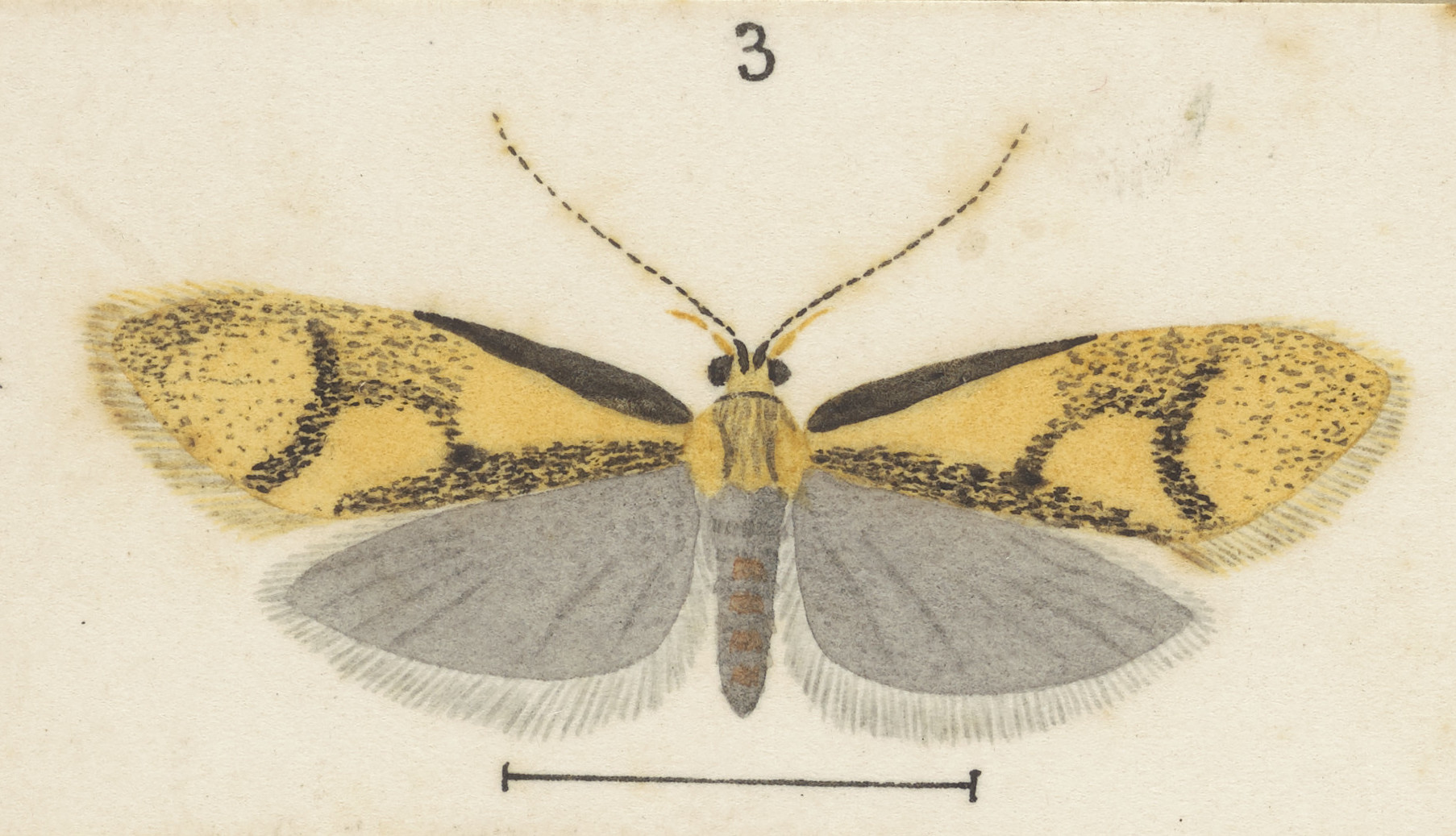
- Illustration of female

Scientific classification
- Kingdom: Animalia
- Phylum: Arthropoda
- Clade: Pancrustacea
- Class: Insecta
- Order: Lepidoptera
- Family: Oecophoridae
- Genus: Euthictis
- Species: E. chloratma

Binomial name
- Euthictis chloratma (Meyrick, 1916)

Synonyms
- Trachypepla chloratma Meyrick, 1916

= Euthictis chloratma =

Species of moth endemic to New Zealand

Euthictis chloratma is a moth of the family Oecophoridae. It was first described by Edward Meyrick in 1916. This species is endemic to New Zealand. The classification of New Zealand endemic moths within the genus Euthictis is regarded as unsatisfactory and in need of revision. As such this species is currently also known as Euthictis (s.l.) chloratma.
