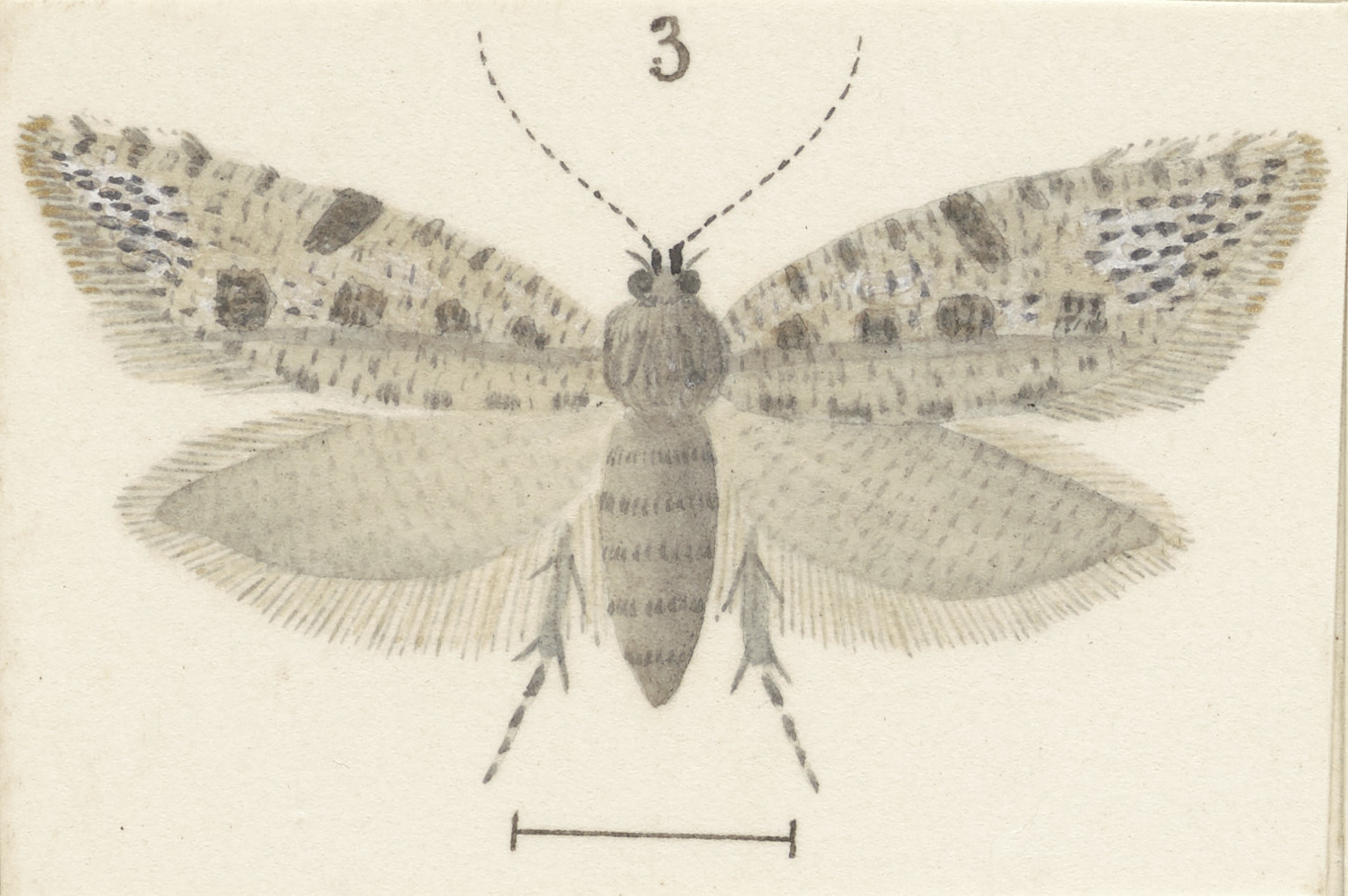
- Illustration of female

Scientific classification
- Kingdom: Animalia
- Phylum: Arthropoda
- Class: Insecta
- Order: Lepidoptera
- Family: Plutellidae
- Genus: Orthenches
- Species: O. saleuta

Binomial name
- Orthenches saleuta Meyrick, 1913

= Orthenches saleuta =

Species of moth endemic to New Zealand

Orthenches saleuta is a moth of the family Plutellidae first described by Edward Meyrick in 1913. It is endemic to New Zealand.
