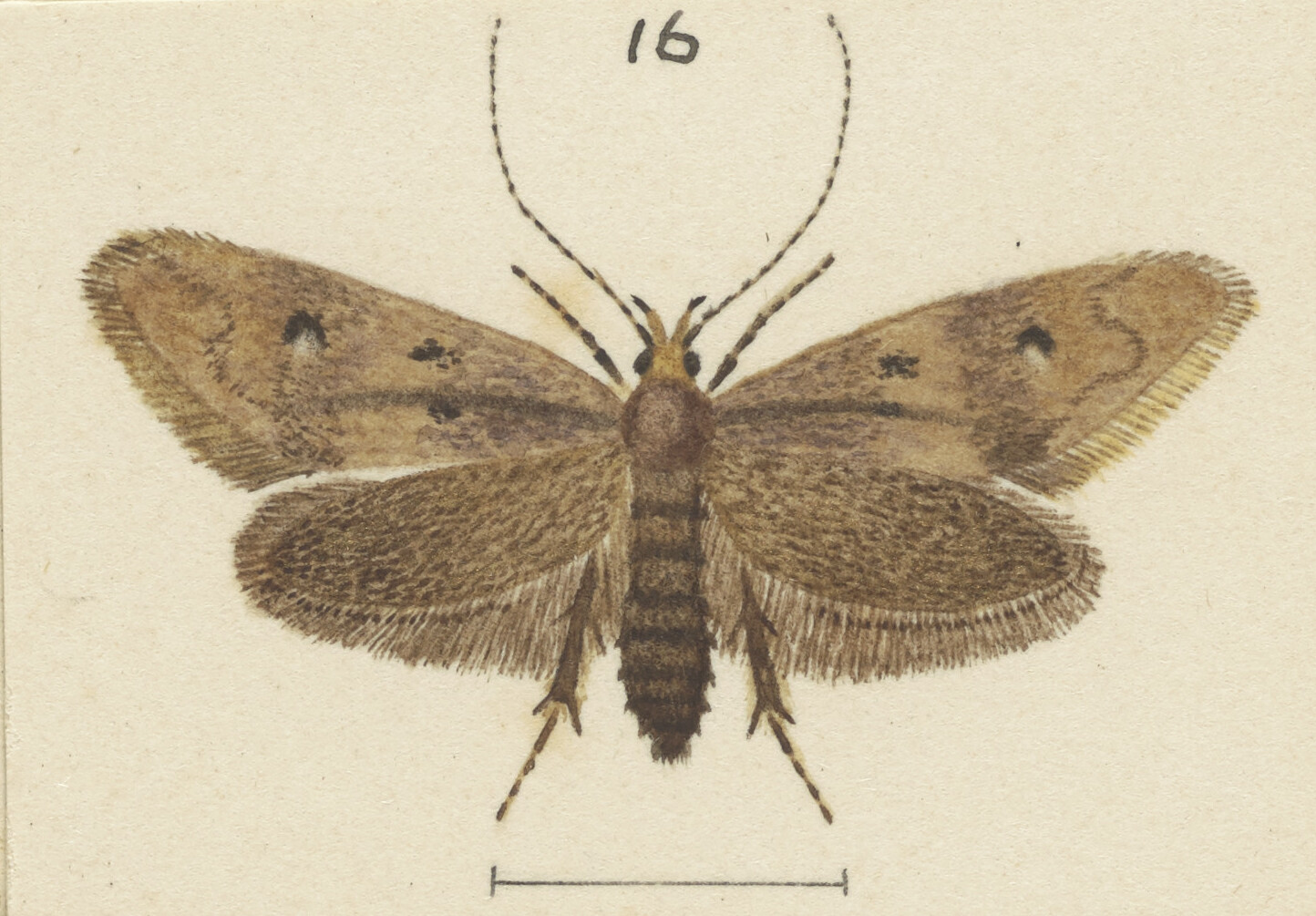

Scientific classification
- Kingdom: Animalia
- Phylum: Arthropoda
- Clade: Pancrustacea
- Class: Insecta
- Order: Lepidoptera
- Family: Oecophoridae
- Genus: Mermeristis
- Species: M. ocneropis

Binomial name
- Mermeristis ocneropis (Meyrick, 1936)

Synonyms
- Trachypepla ocneropis Meyrick, 1936

= Mermeristis ocneropis =

Species of moth endemic to New Zealand

Mermeristis ocneropis is a moth of the family Oecophoridae first described by Edward Meyrick in 1936. It is endemic to New Zealand.
