= Sphyrelata amotella =

Scientific classification
- Kingdom: Animalia
- Phylum: Arthropoda
- Clade: Pancrustacea
- Class: Insecta
- Order: Lepidoptera
- Family: Oecophoridae
- Genus: Sphyrelata
- Species: S. amotella

Binomial name
- Sphyrelata amotella (Walker, 1864)

Synonyms
- Oecophora amotella Walker, 1864; Sphyrelata laetifica Turner, 1917

Species of moth

Sphyrelata amotella is a moth of the family Oecophoridae. It was described by Francis Walker in 1864. It is found in Australia (the Australian Capital Territory, New South Wales and Queensland) and New Zealand.

The larvae damage cork.
