= Eranistis pandora =

Scientific classification
- Domain: Eukaryota
- Kingdom: Animalia
- Phylum: Arthropoda
- Class: Insecta
- Order: Lepidoptera
- Family: Crambidae
- Genus: Neoschoenobia
- Species: N. pandora

Binomial name
- Neoschoenobia pandora Meyrick, 1910

Synonyms
- Neoschoenobia pandora (Meyrick, 1910)

Species of moth

Eranistis pandora is a moth of the family Crambidae. It was first described by Edward Meyrick in 1910. This species is endemic to New Zealand.

== Description ==
Meyrick described this species as follows:

♀. 22mm. Head and thorax light brownish-ochreous. Labial palpi light brownish-ochreous sprinkled with dark fuscous, white towards base beneath, tip white. Maxillary palpi pale ochreous banded with blackish. Abdomen ochreous-whitish. Forewings elongate-triangular, costa moderately arched towards apex, apex obtuse, termen obliquely bowed; brownish-ochreous, thinly sprinkled with dark fuscous; costa suffused with darkfuscous irroration towards base; lines represented by very undefined thick shades of dark-fuscous irroration, first about ¼, slightly curved, second about ¾, nearly parallel to termen, space beyond this more irrorated with dark fuscous. Hindwings ochreous-white. Undersurface of forewings and hindwings suffusedly whitish, with a bent dark-grey post-median line becoming obsolete dorsally.
