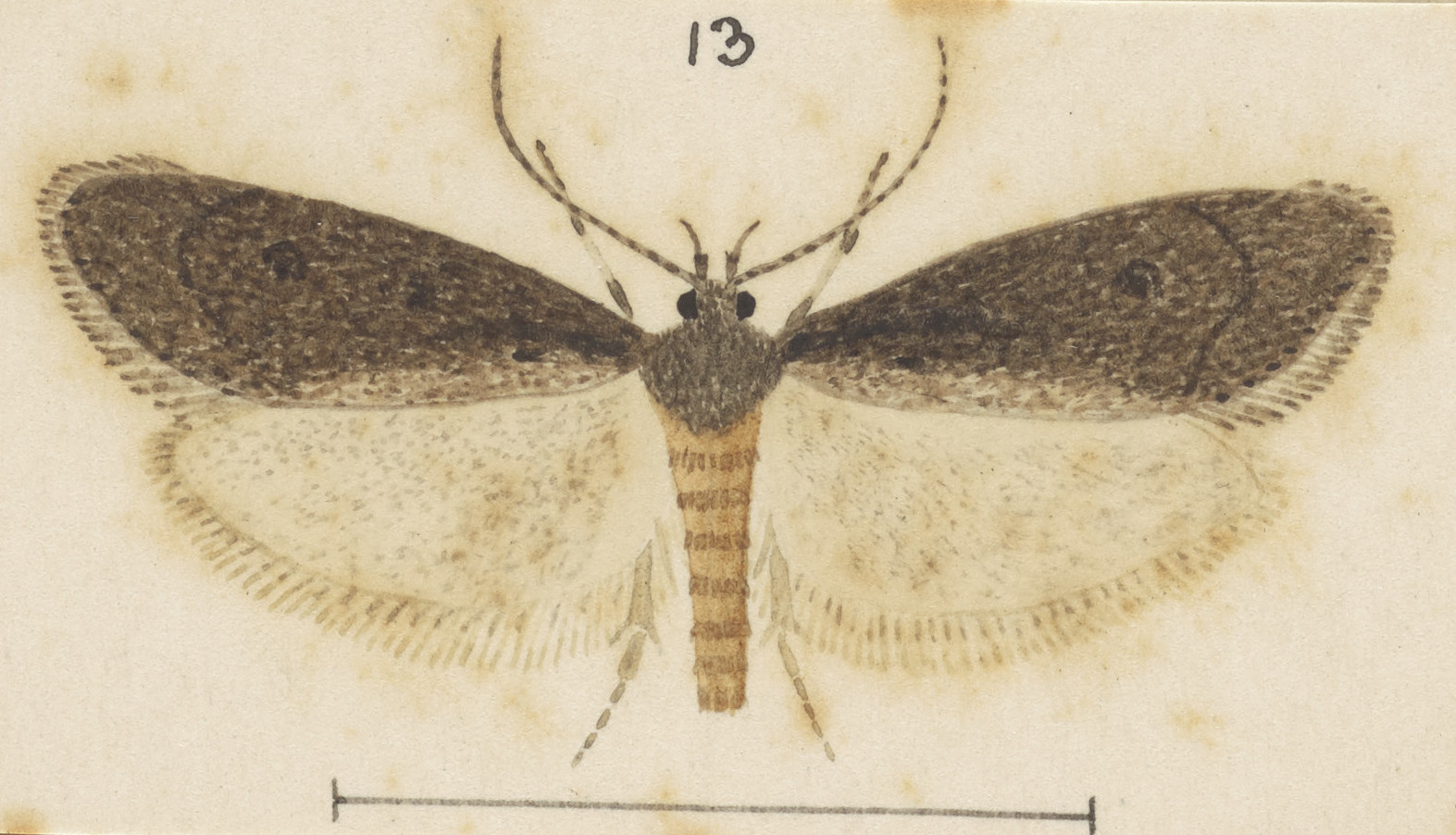
- Illustration of male

Scientific classification
- Kingdom: Animalia
- Phylum: Arthropoda
- Class: Insecta
- Order: Lepidoptera
- Family: Oecophoridae
- Genus: Atomotricha
- Species: A. ommatias

Binomial name
- Atomotricha ommatias Meyrick, 1883

= Atomotricha ommatias =

Species of moth endemic to New Zealand

Atomotricha ommatias is a moth in the family Oecophoridae first described by Edward Meyrick in 1883. It is endemic to New Zealand and has been observed in the South Island. This species inhabits shrubland. The adults are out in the spring months of August and September and are attracted to sugar traps. The female of the species os brachypterous and is incapable of flight. Both the male and female of the species have been observed resting on fences during cold nights. The female, if touched, will hop two or three inches.

== Taxonomy ==
This species was first described by Edward Meyrick in 1883 using specimens collected in Christchurch. George Hudson discussed this species in his 1928 book The Butterflies and Moths of New Zealand. Hudson went on to illustrated the male of the species in his supplement to that book. The male lectotype specimen, collected in Christchurch, is held at the Natural History Museum, London.

== Description ==
Meyrick described this species as follows:

Fore wings fuscous, clouded with darker, three arched discal marks, and a posterior transverse line obscurely darker; hind-wings whitish-grey.

Meyrick, in a later 1883 publication, went on to state:

♂ broader - winged than versuta, ground-colour always fuscous, stigmata not ochreous. ♀ with forewings not acuminate, hindwings partially developed, ovate-lanceolate.

Meyrick gave a fuller description of the species in 1884:

Male. — 21-24 mm.; female. — 13-18 mm. Head, palpi, and thorax pale fuscous, more or less suffused with dark fuscous. Antennae pale fuscous, slenderly annulated with dark fuscous. Abdomen ochreous-whitish. Legs ochreous-whitish, tarsal joints suffused with dark fuscous towards base. Forewings elongate, somewhat dilated posteriorly, costa moderately arched, apex round-pointed, hindmargin very obliquely rounded; light fuscous, irregularly or wholly suffused with dark fuscous; a large tuft of raised scales almost at base, and two or three much smaller in disc; an obscurely indicated pale dot in disc before 1/3, partially surrounded by a dark ring, and a similar one on fold obliquely beyond it; a dark fuscous crescentic spot in disc slightly beyond middle, extremities directed downwards, anteriorly and posteriorly distinctly margined with paler; a slender dark fuscous transverse line from 2/3 of costa obliquely outwards, twice angulated above middle, thence running to 2/3 of inner margin, often obsolete : cilia pale fuscous, mixed with dark fuscous, with a row of cloudy dark fuscous spots. Hind- wings whitish-grey or grey, with a darker grey discal spot; cilia grey-whitish, with one or two cloudy dark grey lines.

The female of the species is brachypterous and is incapable of flight. Hudson regarded this species as closely allied to A. versuta.

== Distribution ==
This species is endemic to New Zealand. This species has been observed in the South Island, at Canterbury, including at Riccarton Bush and Cass. It has also been observed at the West Plains in Southland.

== Habitat ==
This species inhabits shrubland.

== Behaviour ==
The adults of this species are on the wing in the New Zealand spring months of August and September and are attracted to sugar traps. It can be observed resting on fences during cold nights. If touched the female of the species will hop two or three inches.
