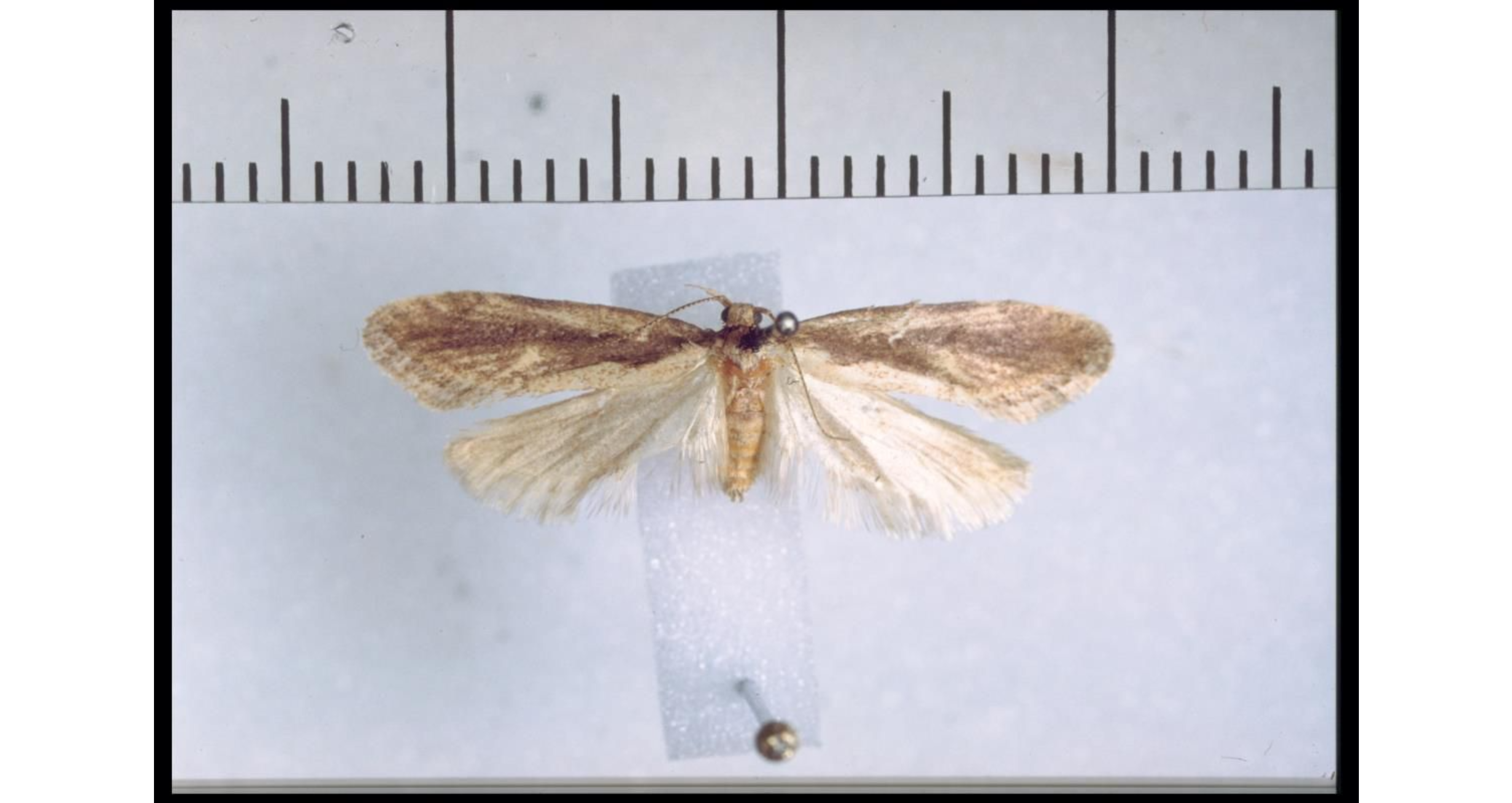
- Holotype specimen

Scientific classification
- Kingdom: Animalia
- Phylum: Arthropoda
- Class: Insecta
- Order: Lepidoptera
- Family: Oecophoridae
- Genus: Atomotricha
- Species: A. lewisi

Binomial name
- Atomotricha lewisi Philpott, 1927

= Atomotricha lewisi =

Species of moth endemic to New Zealand

Atomotricha lewisi is a moth in the family Oecophoridae. This species was first described by Alfred Philpott in 1927 and is endemic to New Zealand. This species has been observed in Central Otago and the Mackenzie Country. The larvae are believed to be soil dwelling with the adults emerging during the winter months of May and June. The female of the species is short winged and flightless and the male of the species have been observed on the wing in August and September.

== Taxonomy ==
This species was first described by Alfred Philpott in 1927 using a specimen likely collected in Central Otago by J. H. Lewis. George Hudson discussed this species in the 1939 in his book A supplement to the Butterflies and Moths of New Zealand. The holotype specimen is held at the New Zealand Arthropod Collection.

== Description ==
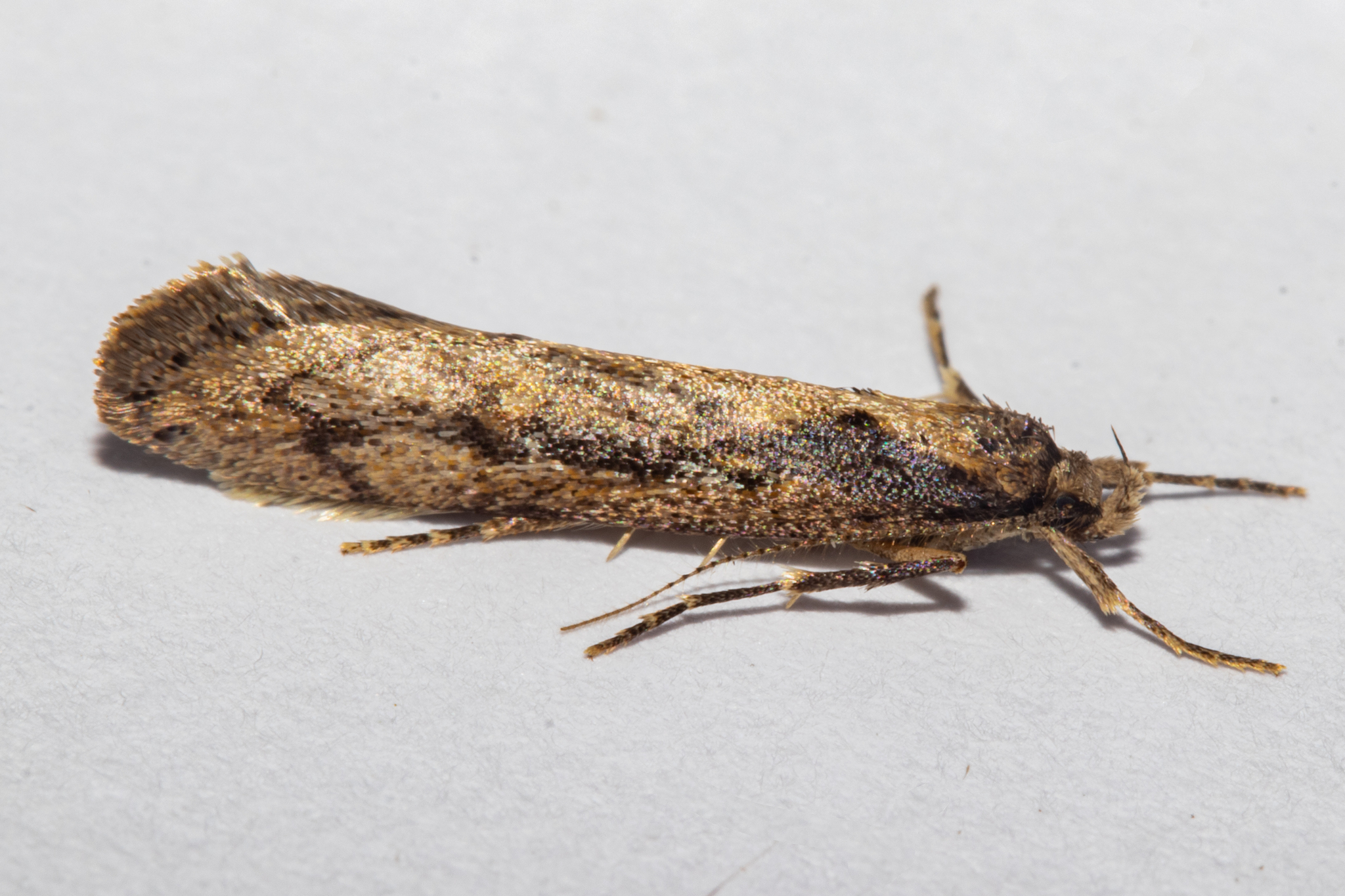
Living male moth

Philpott described this species as follows:

♂. 23–24 mm. Head and thorax dull brown mixed with grey. Palpi with terminal segment much shorter than second, ochreouswhitish mixed with brown externally. Antennae annulated alternately with ochreous-whitish and dark fuscous, ciliations in male 5. Abdomen dull brassy-yellow, segmental divisions whitish and some fuscous on basal segments. Legs ochreous-whitish, more or less infuscated. Forewings, costa moderately arched, apex rounded, termen oblique; dull brown; sometimes a broad stripe of ochreouswhite along dorsum, tapering to tornus and triangularly indented above near base, also a suffused stripe of the same colour beneath costa to about ¾; fringes whitish-ochreous with three or four lines of brown points. Hindwings and fringes ochreous-whitish sprinkled with brown.

Philpott studied the male genitalia of this species and stated that as a result of this study this species is most nearly related to A. isogama.

== Distribution ==
A. lewisi is endemic to New Zealand. It has been observed in Central Otago.

== Behaviour ==
The larvae of this species are believed to be soil dwelling. The adults are known to emerge during the winter months of May and June and males have been observed on the wing in August and September. The females of this species are shortwinged and flightless.
