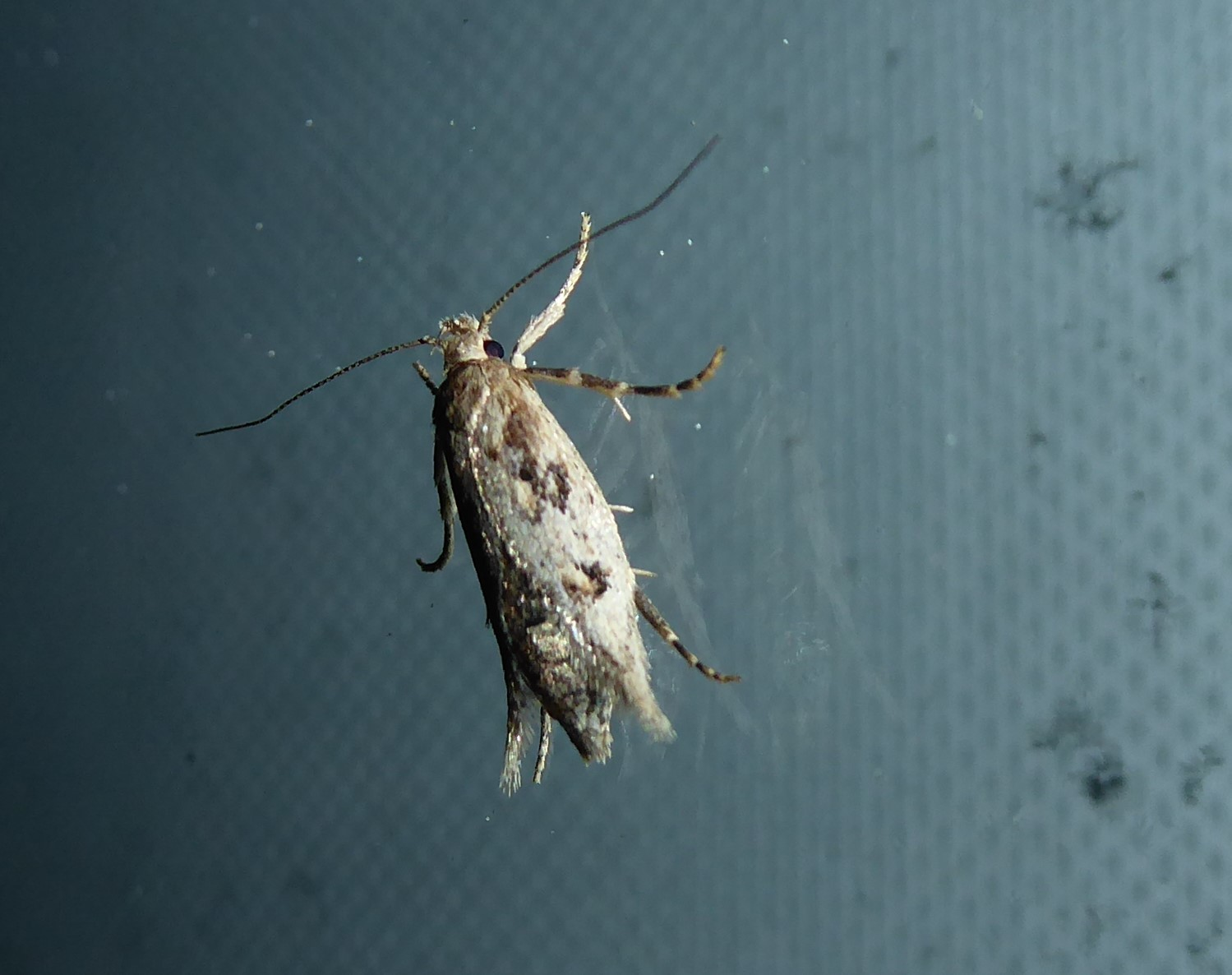
- Female
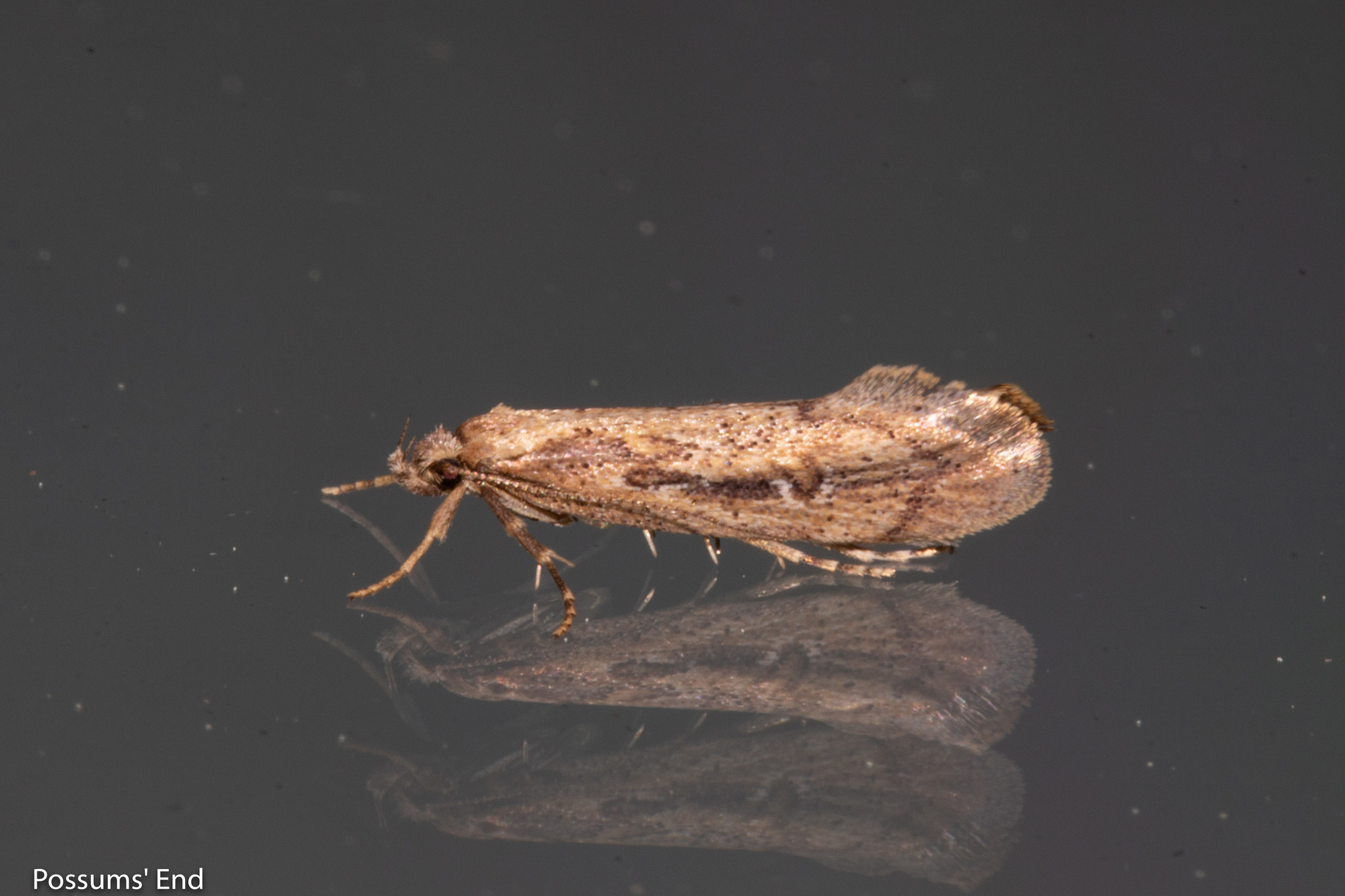
- Male

Scientific classification
- Kingdom: Animalia
- Phylum: Arthropoda
- Class: Insecta
- Order: Lepidoptera
- Family: Oecophoridae
- Genus: Atomotricha
- Species: A. chloronota

Binomial name
- Atomotricha chloronota Meyrick, 1914

= Atomotricha chloronota =

Species of moth endemic to New Zealand

Atomotricha chloronota is a moth in the family Oecophoridae first described by Edward Meyrick in 1914. It is endemic to New Zealand and is found in the eastern side of the South Island and at the Antipodes Islands. It inhabits clearings with native tussocks and ferns. The larvae feed on leaf litter from silk tunnels in soil. The male adults of this species are on the wing from July to September and have been trapped via sugar traps and are attracted to light. The female of this species is brachypterous.

== Taxonomy ==
This species was first described by Edward Meyrick in 1914 using three specimens collected by Alfred Philpott in Invercargill. George Hudson discussed this species in his 1928 book The Butterflies and Moths of New Zealand. He went on to illustrate the male of the species in the 1939 supplement to that publication. The male lectotype specimen, collected in Invercargill, is held at the Natural History Museum, London.

== Description ==
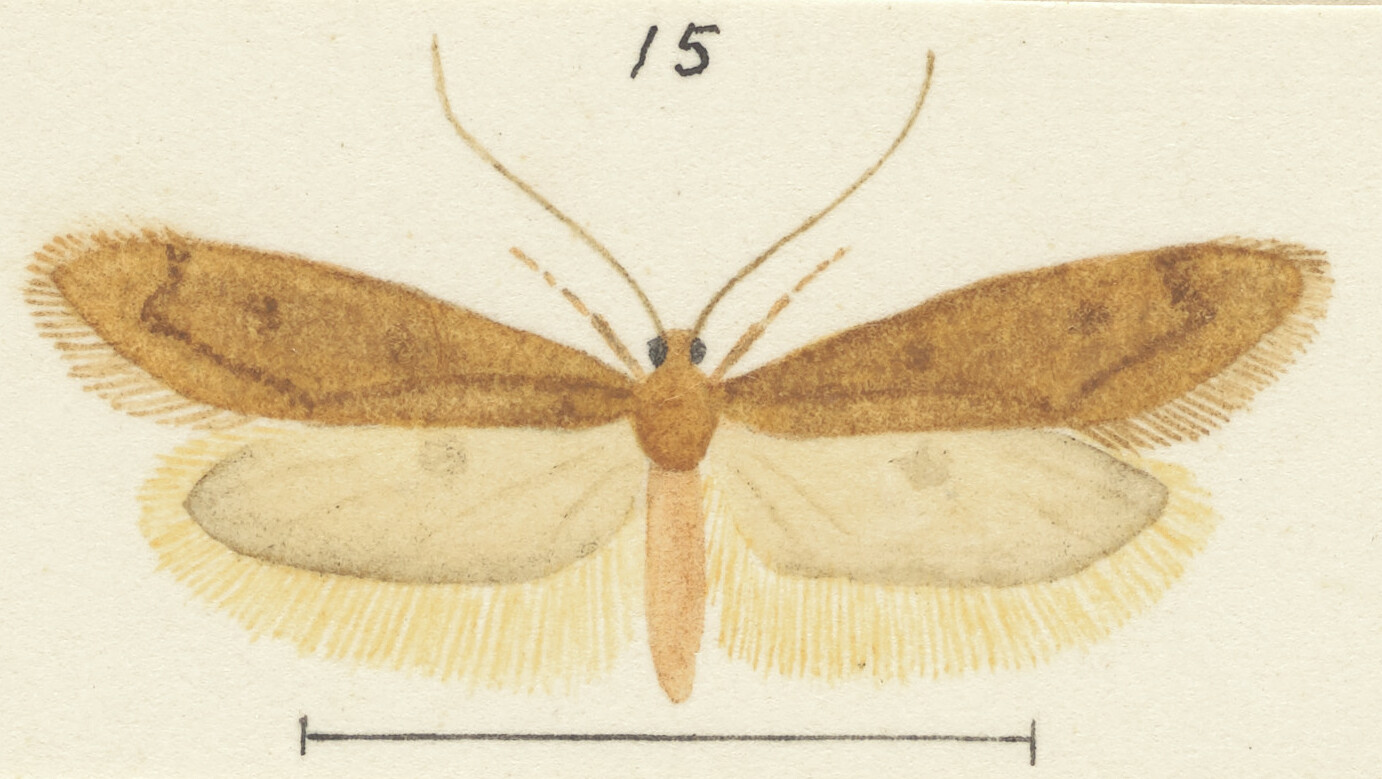
Illustration of a male A. chloronota by G. Hudson.

Meyrick described this species as follows:

♂. 24-25 mm. Head, palpi, and thorax as in versuta. Antennal joints four times as long as their apical width, ciliations 5. Forewings elongate, rather narrow, posteriorly dilated, costa gently arched, hardly sinuate in middle, apex obtuse, termen very obliquely rounded; whitish-ochreous, in one specimen purplish-fuscous except dorsal area; a cloudy blackish median longitudinal streak from base almost to apex; in the darker specimen second discal stigma indicated by a pale-ochreous spot touching median streak and pale dorsal area : cilia whitish-ochreous, in the darker specimen mixed with fuscous and dotted with darker at base. Hindwings pale whitish-ochreous partially tinged with grey, especially on a suffused supramedian streak in disc; cilia ochreous-whitish.
♀. 17 mm. Forewings broad-lanceolate, acuminate; purplish-fuscous, with whitish-ochreous dorsal area; second discal stigma represented by a cloudy ochreous-whitish spot ringed with dark fuscous. Hindwings rudimentary.

The male of this species resembles Atomotricha versuta. The female of this species are brachypterous. The species in the Antipodes Islands are smaller and duller in appearance.

== Distribution ==
This species is endemic to New Zealand. It is found on the eastern side of the South Island as well as at the Antipodes Islands.

== Habitat ==
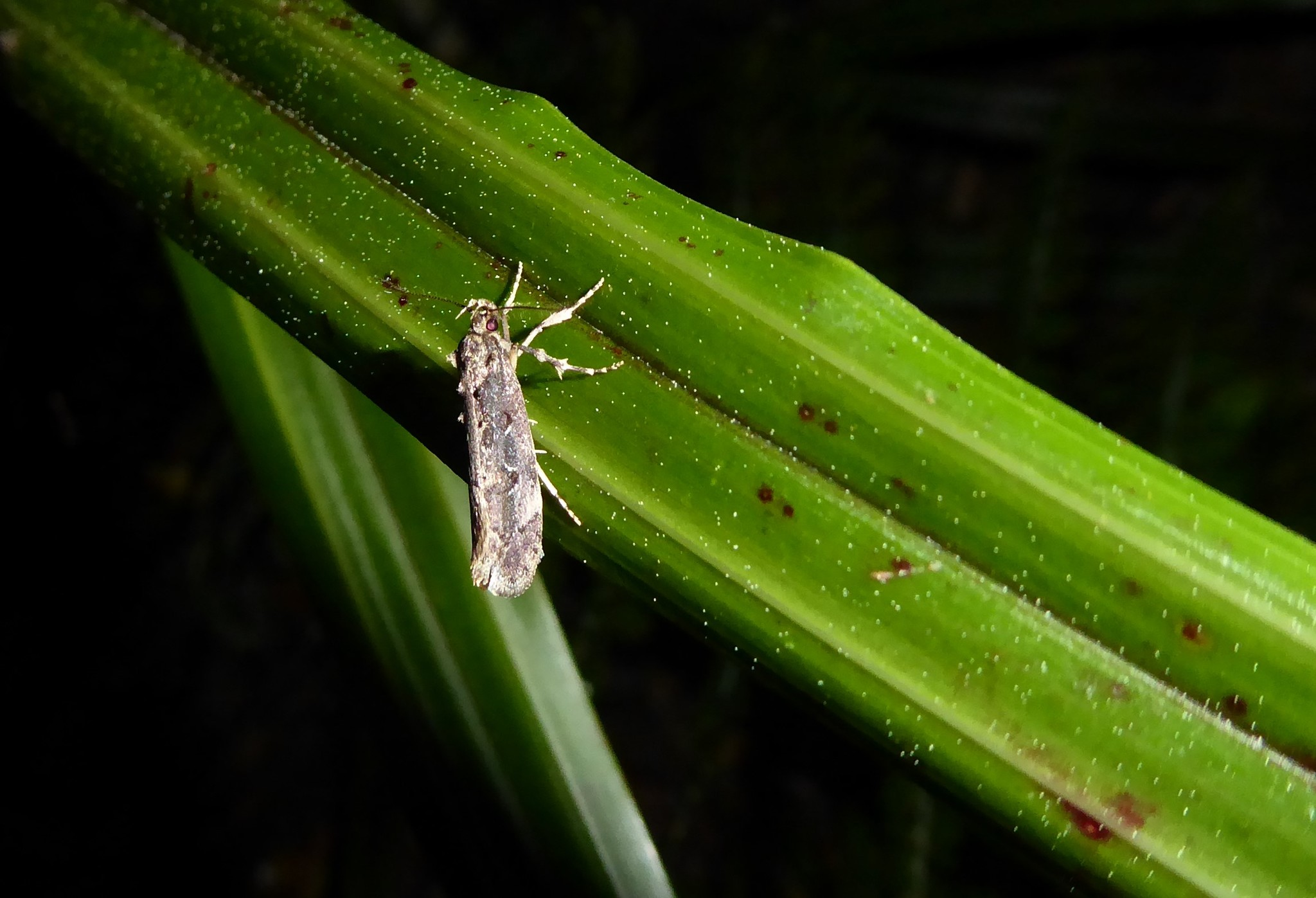
Observation of A. chloronota

This species inhabits clearings with tussocks and ferns.

== Behaviour ==
The male adults of this species are nocturnal and have been observed on the wing from July to September. This species has been trapped via sugar traps. The adult moths are attracted to light.

== Hosts ==
The larvae of this species form silk tunnels in the soil and then feed on leaf litter.
