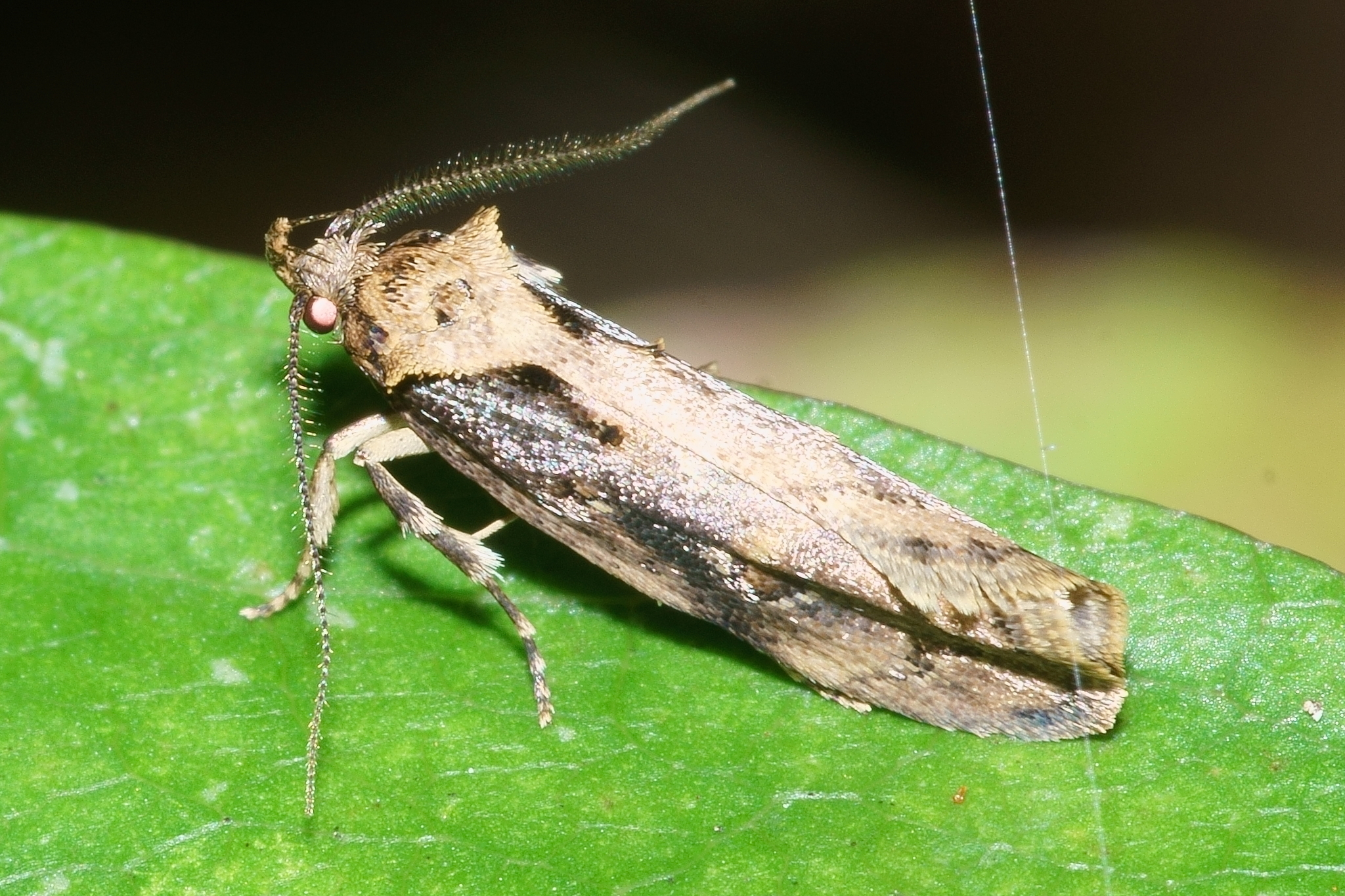
- Atomotricha isogama

Scientific classification
- Kingdom: Animalia
- Phylum: Arthropoda
- Class: Insecta
- Order: Lepidoptera
- Family: Oecophoridae
- Subfamily: Oecophorinae
- Genus: Atomotricha; Meyrick, 1883

Type species
- Atomotricha ommatias Meyrick, 1883

Synonyms
- Brachysara Meyrick, 1883

= Atomotricha =

Genus of moths

Atomotricha is a genus of moths of the family Oecophoridae. The species in this genus are endemic to New Zealand.

== Taxonomy ==
This genus was circumscribed in 1883 by Edward Meyrick. Meyrick went on to describe this genus in a later 1883 publication. The type species is A. ommatias.

== Description ==
Meyrick described this genus as follows:

Antennae in ♂ moderate, with fine long ciliations (5), six at apex of each joint, basal joint with strong pecten. Palpi rather long, second joint exceeding base of antennae, densely scaled, somewhat rough beneath, terminal joint shorter than second, slender, recurved. Thorax smooth. Forewings elongate, surface with tufts of raised scales. Hindwings as broad as forewings, elongate-ovate, hind margin rounded, cilia 3/5. Wings of ♀ abbreviated, incapable of flight. Forewings with vein 7 to apex, 2 from hardly before angle. Hindwings normal.

In many species in this genus the adult females are brachypterous and are incapable of flight. The markings and colouration can also be extremely variable within a species.

== Distribution ==
The species within this genus are all endemic to New Zealand.

== Species ==
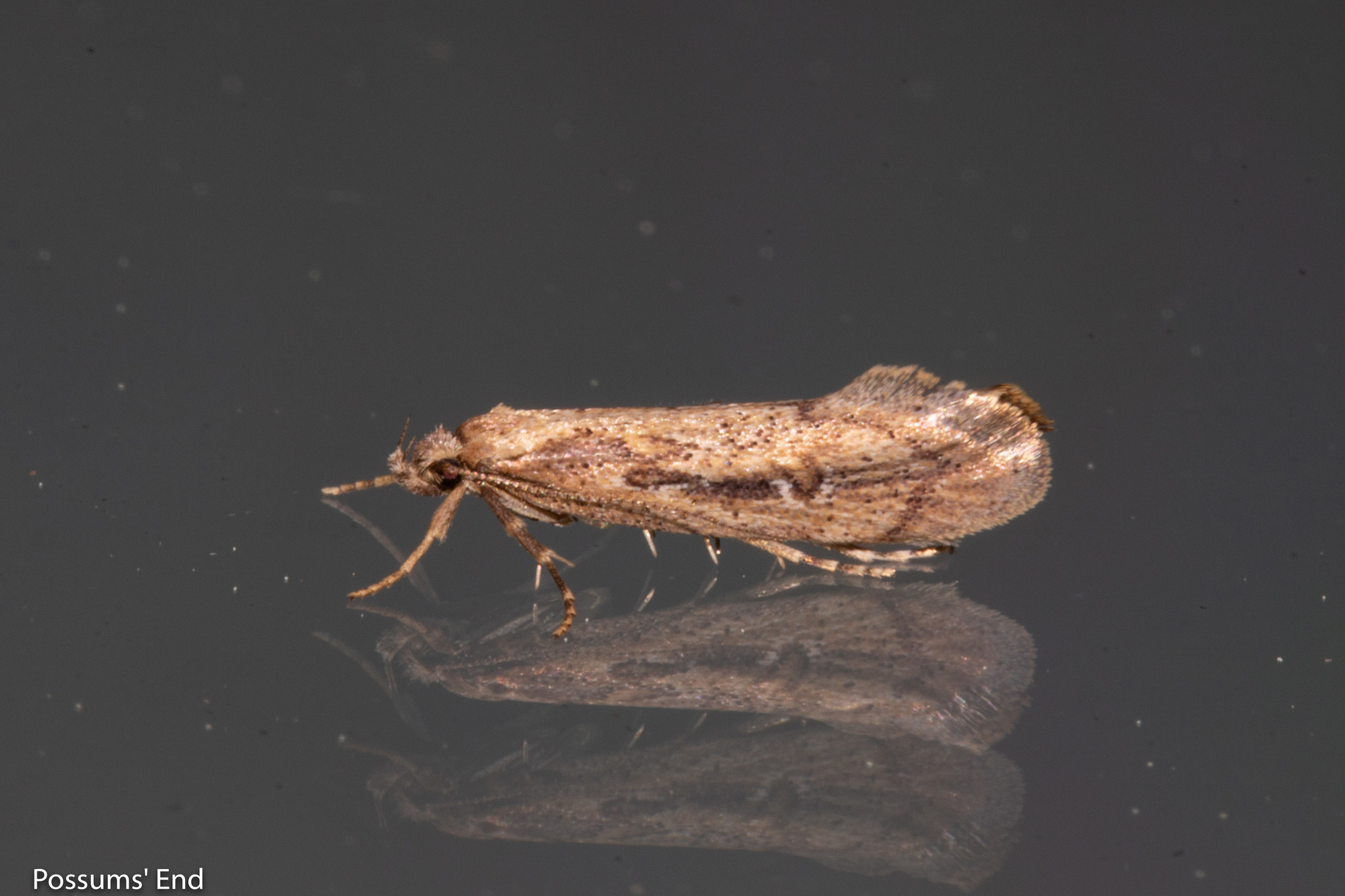
Atomotricha chloronota.

As of 2010, it consists of the following species:

- Atomotricha chloronota Meyrick, 1914
- Atomotricha exsomnis Meyrick, 1913
- Atomotricha isogama Meyrick, 1909
- Atomotricha lewisi Philpott, 1927
- Atomotricha oeconoma Meyrick, 1914
- Atomotricha ommatias Meyrick, 1883
- Atomotricha prospiciens Meyrick, 1924
- Atomotricha sordida (Butler, 1877)
- Atomotricha versuta Meyrick, 1914
