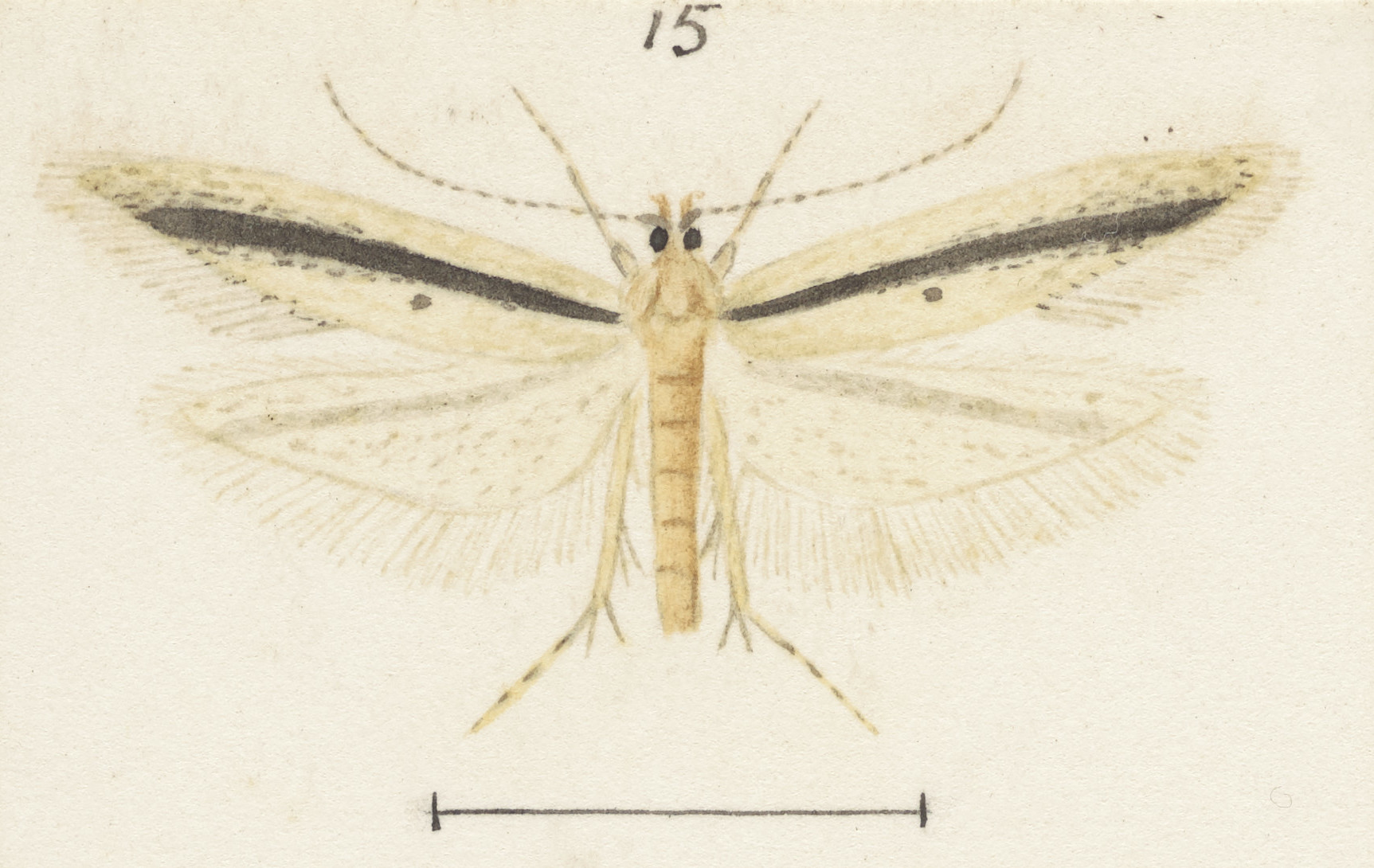
- Illustration of male

Scientific classification
- Kingdom: Animalia
- Phylum: Arthropoda
- Class: Insecta
- Order: Lepidoptera
- Family: Oecophoridae
- Genus: Atomotricha
- Species: A. sordida

Binomial name
- Atomotricha sordida (Butler, 1877)

Synonyms
- Oecophora sordida Butler, 1877; Brachysara sordida (Butler, 1877)

= Atomotricha sordida =

Species of moth endemic to New Zealand

Atomotricha sordida is a moth in the family Oecophoridae first described by Arthur Gardiner Butler in 1877. It is endemic to New Zealand and has been observed in the South Island in the Canterbury and Otago regions. The adult female of the species is brachypterous.

== Taxonomy ==
A. sordida was described by Arthur Gardiner Butler in 1877 using specimens collected by Dr. Hector and J. D. Enys in either Dunedin, Christchurch or Castle Hill. Butler originally named the species Oecophora sordida. In 1884 Edward Meyrick placed this species in the genus Brachysara. In 1914 Meyrick again reevaluated the placement of this species and placed it in the genus Atomotricha. Hudson discussed and illustrated this species in his 1928 book The Butterflies and Moths of New Zealand. The male holotype is held at the Natural History Museum, London.

== Description ==
Butler described this species as follows:

Primaries pale shining brown; a small arched marking just beyond the end of the cell, the outer border, and fringe grey; secondaries silvery white; body testaceous: wings below silvery white, primaries slightly brownish; pectus (apparently) silvery white; legs and venter pale testaceous. Expanse of wings 10 lines.

Meyrick described the species as follows:

Male. — 20-21 mm. Head, palpi, and thorax light, fuscous, somewhat mixed with darker. Antennae light fuscous. Abdomen ochreous-whitish. Legs ochreous-whitish, anterior pair obscurely suffused with fuscous. Fore-wings elongate, narrow, costa slightly arched, distinctly sinuate in middle, apex round-pointed, hindmargin extremely oblique, slightly rounded; light fuscous, sometimes slightly mixed with darker; a straight narrow tolerably well-defined blackish longitudinal streak somewhat above middle from base nearly to apex, tending to be very slightly interrupted at 1/3 and 2/3, rather suffused beneath towards apex and near base, sometimes entirely obsolete; when obsolete, there are sometimes visible an arched fuscous mark before 1/3 and another just beyond middle, which are usually obscured by the streak; a slender very obscure fuscous transverse line from 3/4 of costa to 3/4 of inner margin, twice angulated above middle, usually terminating the longitudinal streak, often obsolete : cilia light fuscous, with a cloudy blackish interrupted basal line. Hindwings whitish, slightly suffused with ochreous-grey towards costa; cilia whitish, with faint cloudy grey basal and apical lines.

Hudson stated that this species is similar in appearance to A. oeconoma and that the female of A. sordida resembles the female of A. oeconoma. However the brachypterous forewings of A. sordida have a blackish longitudinal streak and the hind wings are rudimentary.

== Distribution ==
This species is endemic to New Zealand. This species has been observed in the South Island, including in Castle Hill, Rakaia, Christchurch and Dunedin.
