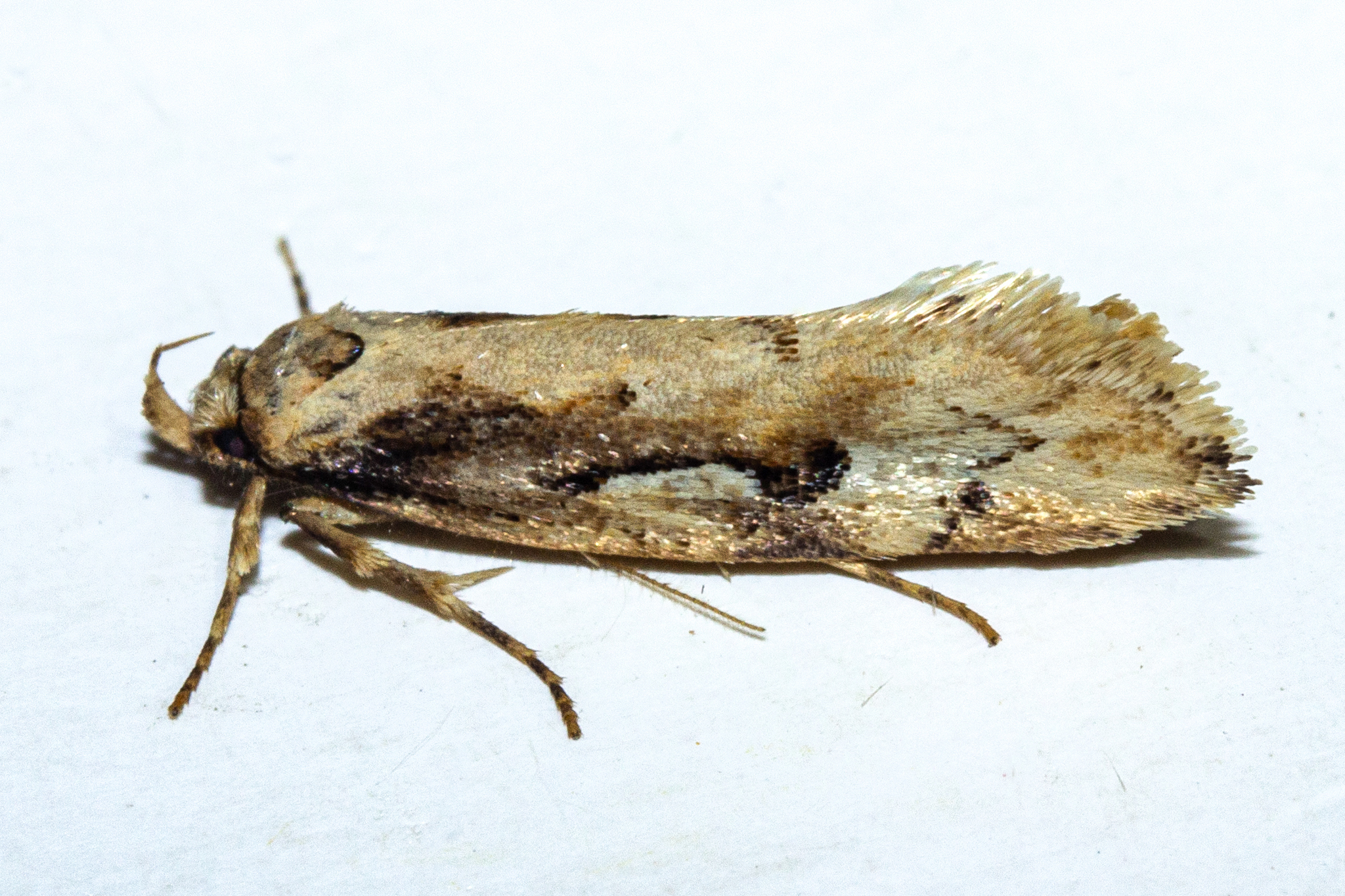

Scientific classification
- Kingdom: Animalia
- Phylum: Arthropoda
- Clade: Pancrustacea
- Class: Insecta
- Order: Lepidoptera
- Family: Oecophoridae
- Genus: Atomotricha
- Species: A. prospiciens

Binomial name
- Atomotricha prospiciens Meyrick, 1924

= Atomotricha prospiciens =

Species of moth endemic to New Zealand

Atomotricha prospiciens is a moth in the family Oecophoridae first described by Edward Meyrick in 1924. It is endemic to New Zealand and has been observed in Fiordland and the Milford Sound. Adults of this species have been observed from October to December.

== Taxonomy ==
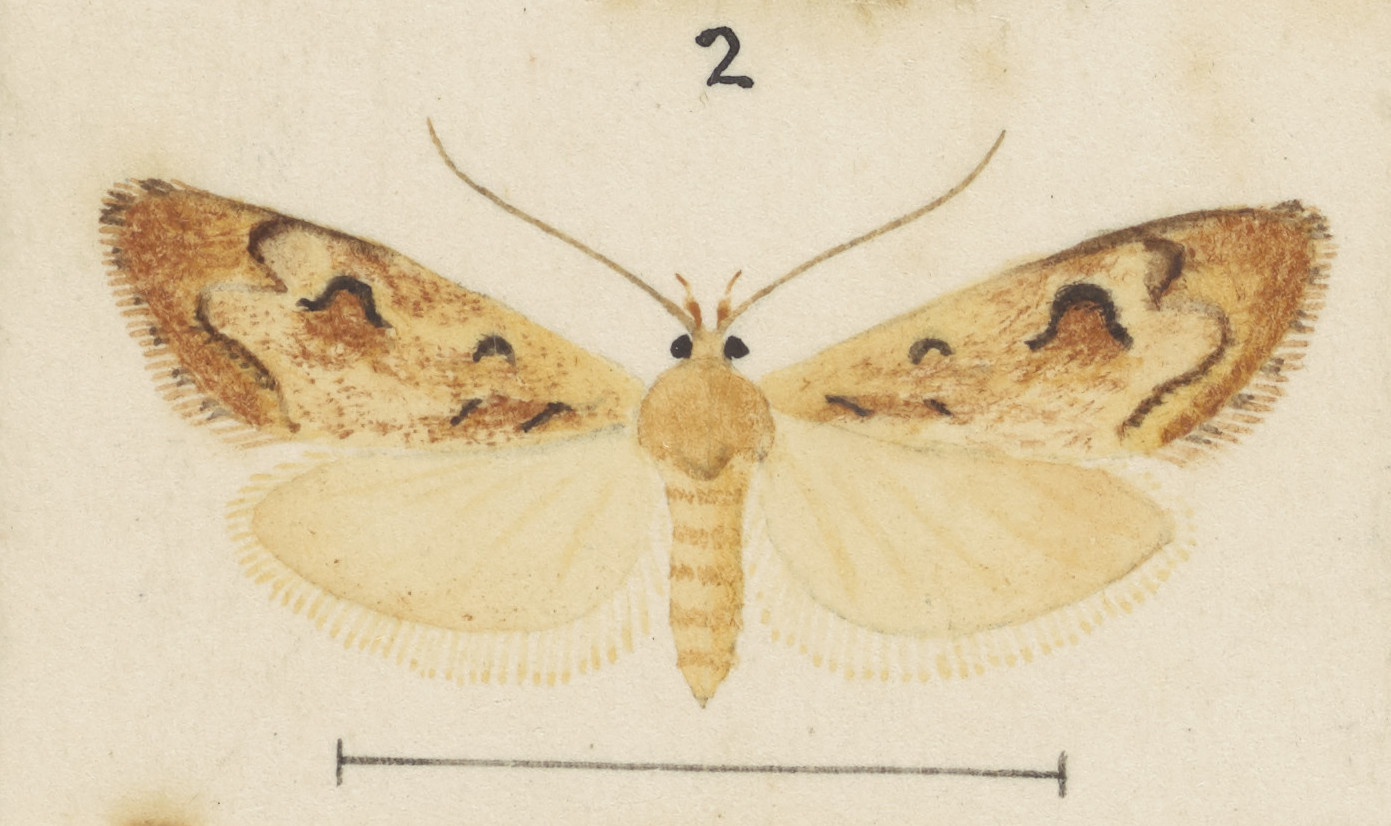
Illustration of female

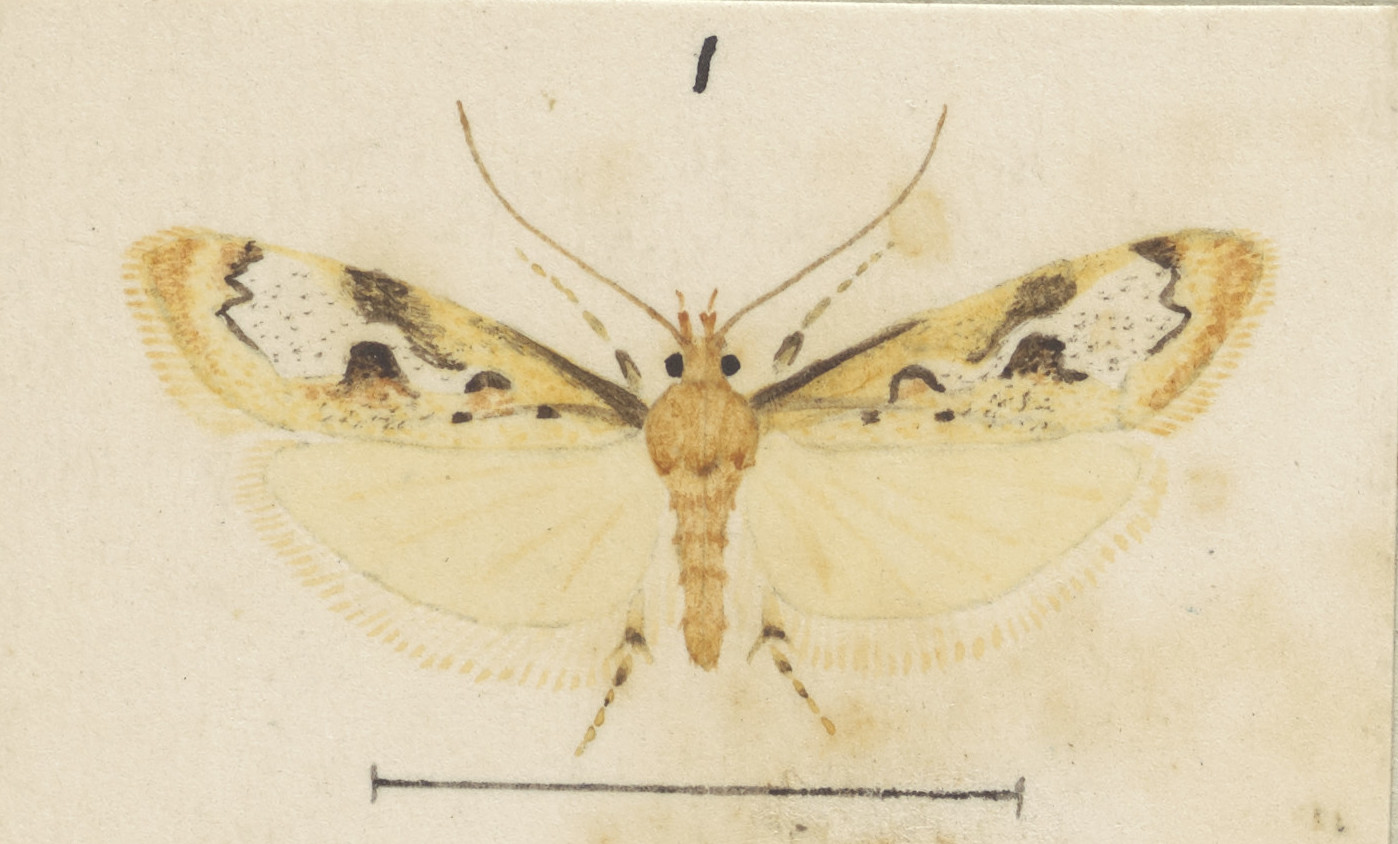
Illustration of male

This species was first described by Edward Meyrick using one specimen collected at the Pompolona Huts, on the Milford Track in Fiordland in December by Charles Edwin Clarke. The male holotype specimen is held at the Natural History Museum, London.

== Description ==
Meyrick described this species as follows:

♂. 20mm. Head and thorax ochreous-whitish, shoulders more ochreous . Palpi ochreous-whitish, towards base irrorated dark fuscous. Forewings elongate, termen very obliquely rounded; ochreous-whitish partially suffused pale yellow-ochreous and sprinkled fuscous, dorsal area more whitish; a thick streak of dark-fuscous suffusion from base of costa along fold to near middle of wing, with a blackish dot at its apex and one on its lower edge at 1/4 of wing, fold beyond this suffused white to near tornus; discal stigmata represented by circles of brown suffusion of the white upper half is mixed blackish, these connected by a curved white streak, beyond second a blotch of white suffusion, above and before second some fuscous suffusion extending to costa; a dark-fuscous line from near costa near at 3/4 to near tornus, angulated in middle and zigzag above this, connected with costa by a spot of brownish suffusion; some brownish suffusion along upper part of termen : cilia whitish-ochreous, base white. Hingwings and cilia ochreous-whitish.

== Distribution ==
This species is endemic to New Zealand. As well as the Milford Track in Fiordland, A. prospiciens has been observed in Eglinton Valley, in the Milford Sound.

== Behaviour ==
The adults of this species are on the wing from October to December.
