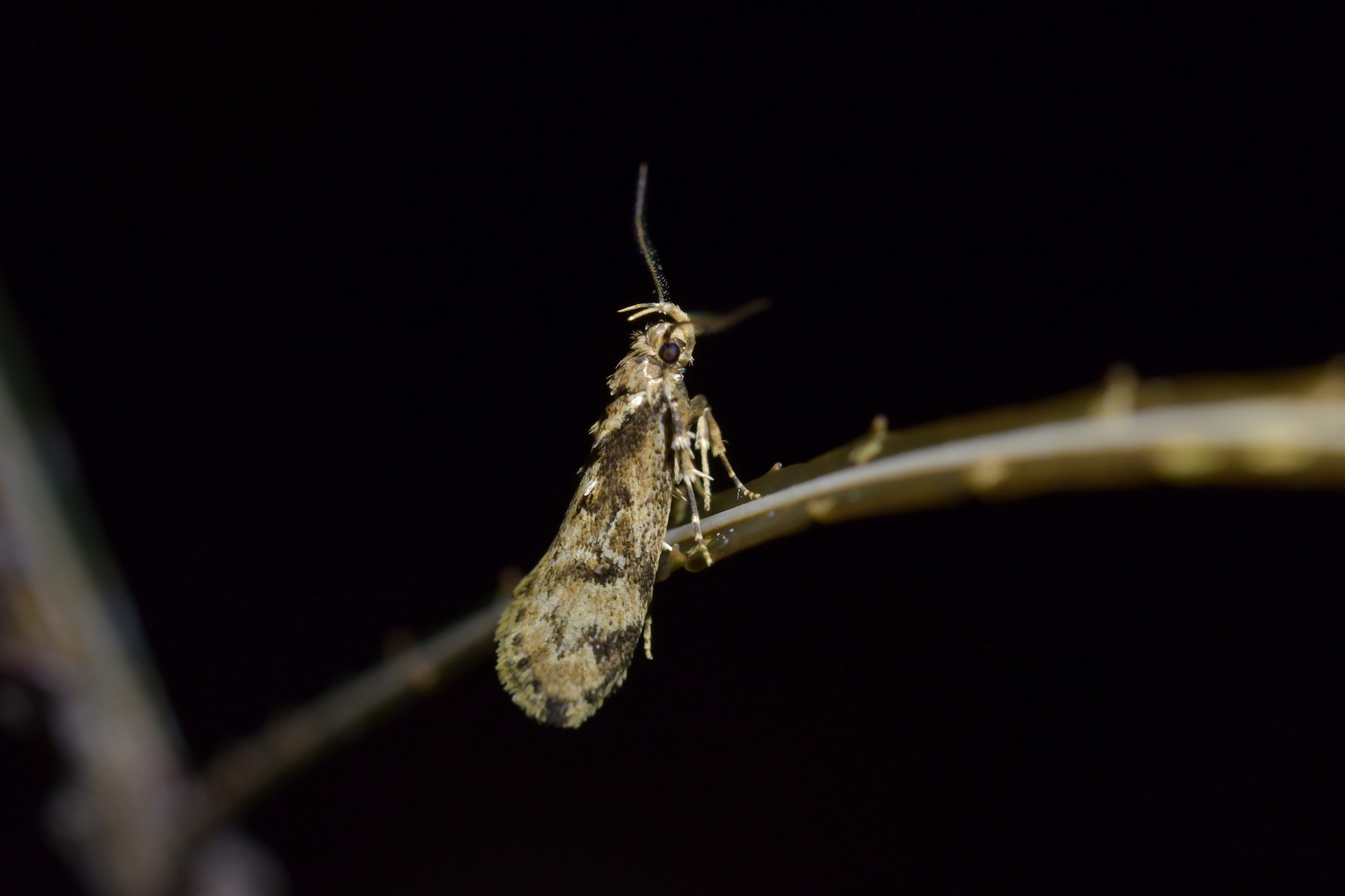

Scientific classification
- Kingdom: Animalia
- Phylum: Arthropoda
- Class: Insecta
- Order: Lepidoptera
- Family: Oecophoridae
- Genus: Atomotricha
- Species: A. exsomnis

Binomial name
- Atomotricha exsomnis Meyrick, 1913

= Atomotricha exsomnis =

Species of moth endemic to New Zealand

Atomotricha exsomnis is a species of moth in the family Oecophoridae. It was first described by Edward Meyrick in 1913. It is endemic to New Zealand and can be found in both the North and South Islands. Adults are on the wing from November until January.

== Taxonomy ==
This species was first described by Edward Meyrick in 1913 using a male specimen collected at Ohakune by George Hudson. Hudson discussed and illustrated this species in his 1928 book The Butterflies and Moths of New Zealand. Alfred Philpott studied A. exsomnis in 1927 examining the genitalia of this species. The male holotype specimen is held at the Natural History Museum, London.

== Description ==
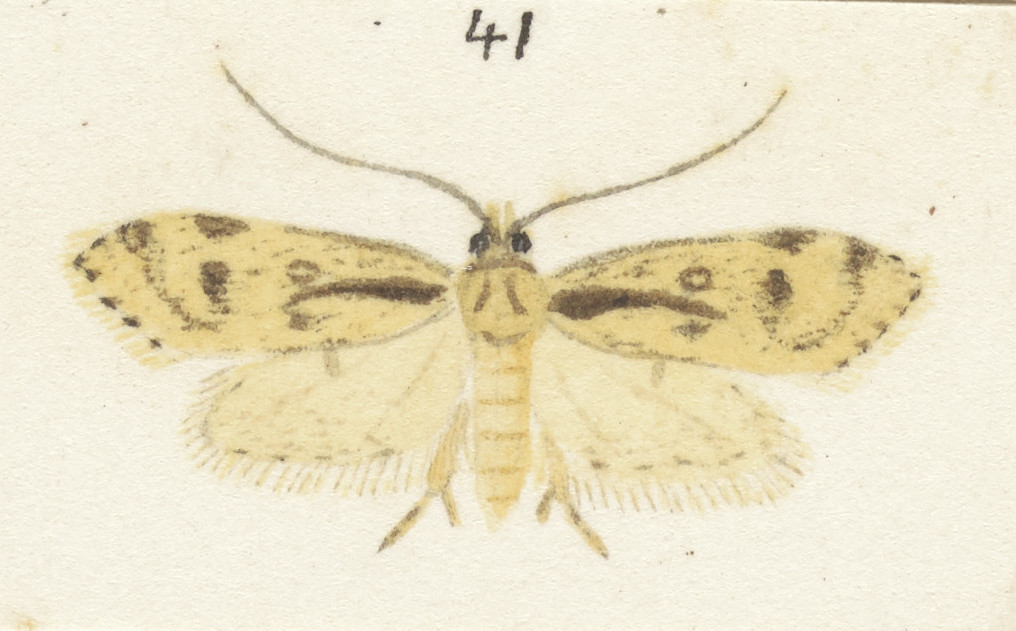
Illustration of male by George Hudson.

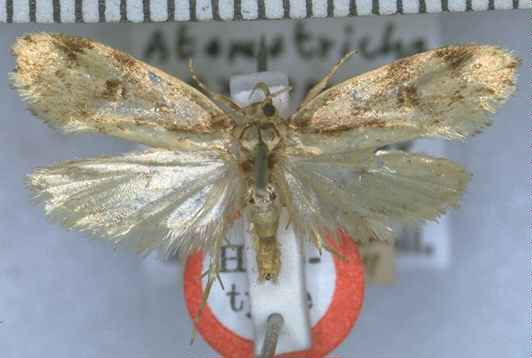
Male holotype of Atomotricha exsomnis.

Edward Meyrick described this species as follows:

♂. 24 mm. Head and thorax whitish-ochreous, collar dark fuscous. Palpi whitish-ochreous, second joint sprinkled and towards base suffused with fuscous. Abdomen whitish-ochreous, segments yellowish-ochreous towards the base. Forewings elongate, somewhat dilated posteriorly, costa moderately arched, apex obtuse, termen very obliquely rounded; whitish-ochreous, somewhat sprinkled with fuscous and dark fuscous; a suffused dark-fuscous streak running from base of costa to plical stigma; stigmata large, dark fuscous, pale-centred, especially second discal, plical obliquely beyond first discal; a spot of dark-fuscous suffusion on costa above second discal stigma, and a larger spot on costa at ¾, whence an indistinct angulated dark-fuscous line runs to dorsum before tornus: cilia whitish-ochreous, on upper half of termen spotted with fuscous at base. Hindwings whitish-ochreous; a grey discal dot: cilia whitish-ochreous.

This species is similar in appearance to A. isogama but can be distinguished as A. exsomnis has a strongly W-shaped postmedian line and a bolder blotch on the costa at the end of the postmedian line. It has been hypothesised that the adult female of the species may not be brachypterous.

== Distribution ==
This species is endemic to New Zealand. As well as being observed at its type locality of Ohakune, it has been recorded at Mount Ruapehu, Tongariro, Saint Arnaud. It is regarded as being very local.

== Habitat ==
This species inhabits native forest.

== Behaviour ==
The adult moths are on the wing from November until January.
