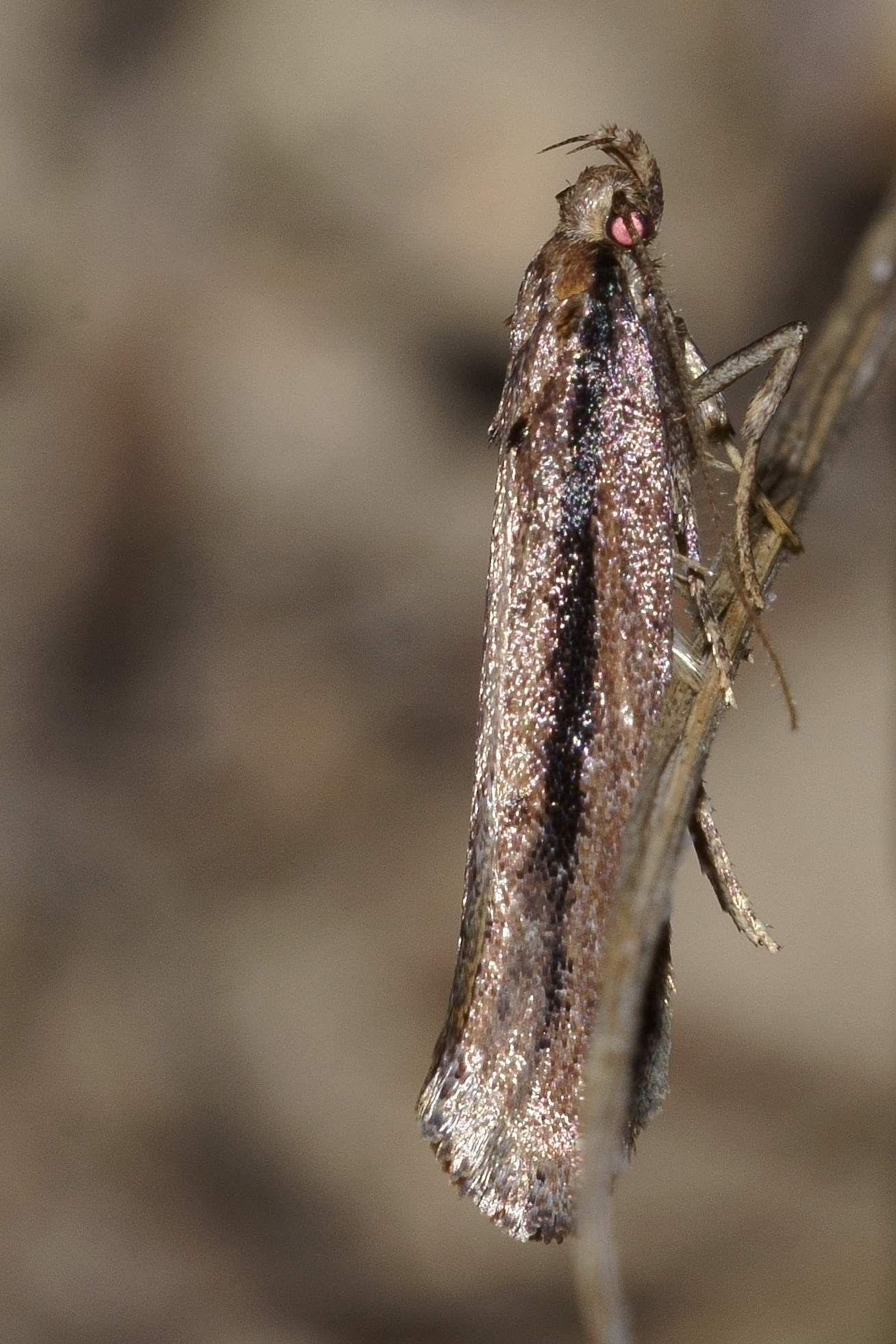
- Male

Scientific classification
- Kingdom: Animalia
- Phylum: Arthropoda
- Class: Insecta
- Order: Lepidoptera
- Family: Oecophoridae
- Genus: Atomotricha
- Species: A. versuta

Binomial name
- Atomotricha versuta Meyrick, 1914

= Atomotricha versuta =

Species of moth endemic to New Zealand

Atomotricha versuta is a moth in the family Oecophoridae first described by Edward Meyrick in 1914. It is endemic to New Zealand and has been observed in both the North and South Islands. The adults of the species are variable in appearance but the three principal variteis are connected b intermediate forms. The female of the species is brachypterous and is incapable of flight. Both the adult male and female have been observed resting on fences during cold winter nights.

== Taxonomy ==
This species was first described by Edward Meyrick in 1914 using 8 specimens collected in August in Karori by George Hudson. 1n 1927 Alfred Philpott studied the male genitalia of this species. Philpott commended that the male genitalia of A. versuta was indistinguishable from that of A. chloronota and A. sordida and as such he hypothesised that these three species may form one widely distributed species. Hudson discussed and illustrated this species in his 1928 book The Butterflies and Moths of New Zealand. The male lectotype specimen is held at the Natural History Museum, London.

== Description ==
Meyrick described this species as follows:

♂. 23-28 mm. Head and thorax pale brownish-ochreous, shoulders or front of thorax sometimes dark fuscous. Palpi whitish-ochreous, with second joint exceeding base of antennae, rather rough towards apex beneath, suffused with dark-fuscous irroration on lower 2/3 and a subapical ring, terminal joint rather more than half second, more or less sprinkled with dark fuscous. Antennal joints thrice as long as their apical width, ciliations 5. Abdomen whitish-ochreous. Forewings elongate, rather narrow, slightly dilated posteriorly, costa gently arched, slightly sinuate in middle, apex obtuse, termen very obliquely rounded; light brownish-ochreous, with scattered black and dark-fuscous scales, in one specimen suffused with fuscous except on dorsal third; stigmata represented by brownish or fuscous rings, usually incomplete beneath, plical obliquely beyond first discal; sometimes a fine angulated fuscous line from 3/4 of costa to tornus; in the largest specimen there is a strong black median longitudinal streak from base to 2/3, thence attenuated to 5/6 : cilia whitish-ochreous mixed with fuscous, with a basal series of blackish dots. Hindwings pale whitish-ochreous more or less tinged or suffused with light grey; cilia pale whitish-ochreous, with several fuscous basal dots. ♀. 17-19 mm. Forewings broad - lanceolate, acuminate; ochreous-brownish or fuscous, dorsal area sufi isedly paler or whitish-ochreous; fold more or less suffused with dark fuscous on basal third; stigmata represented by pale - ochreous spots edged about with dark fuscous or blackish. Hindwings rudimentary.

The female of the species is brachypterous and is incapable of flight. Hudson when discussing this species explained that there are three principal varieties connected by intermediate forms. Hudson describes these forms as follows:

(1.) Fore-wings bright ochreous-brown with blackish central stripe and terminal dots.

(2.) Fore-wings pale ochreous-brown with brown discal marks before and beyond middle; a very strongly angulated transverse line at 2 and a series of faint terminal spots.
(3.) Same as 2 but the whole of the fore-wings, except a broad dorsal stripe, clouded with dull brown. This form varies much in the general depth of the colouring, the fore-wings of some specimens being more or less clouded with dull black.

In all the varieties the hind-wings are pale ochreous, tinged with grey in the darker forms; there is often a series of faint terminal dots on the cilia.

Male and Female varieties of A. versuta.
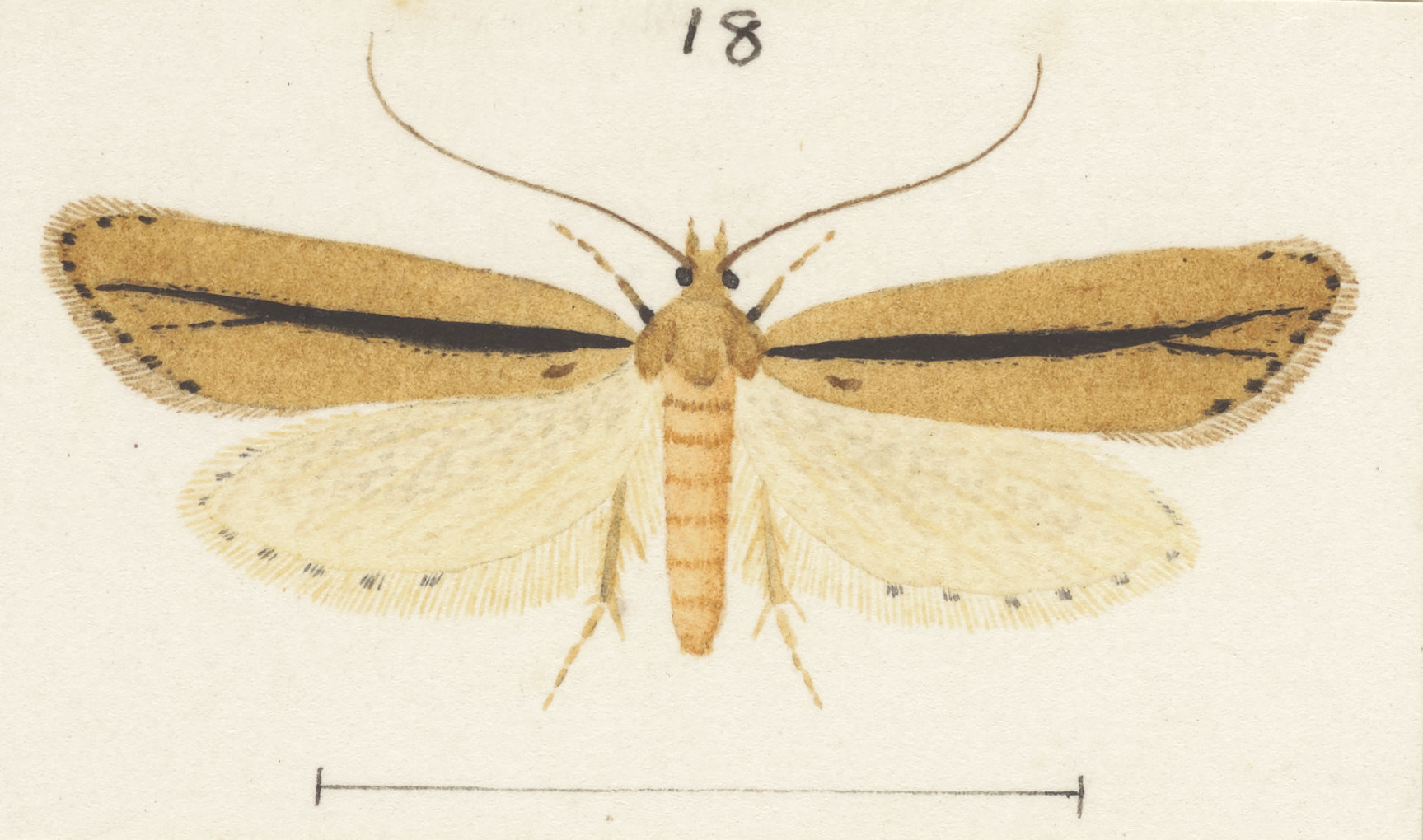
Male

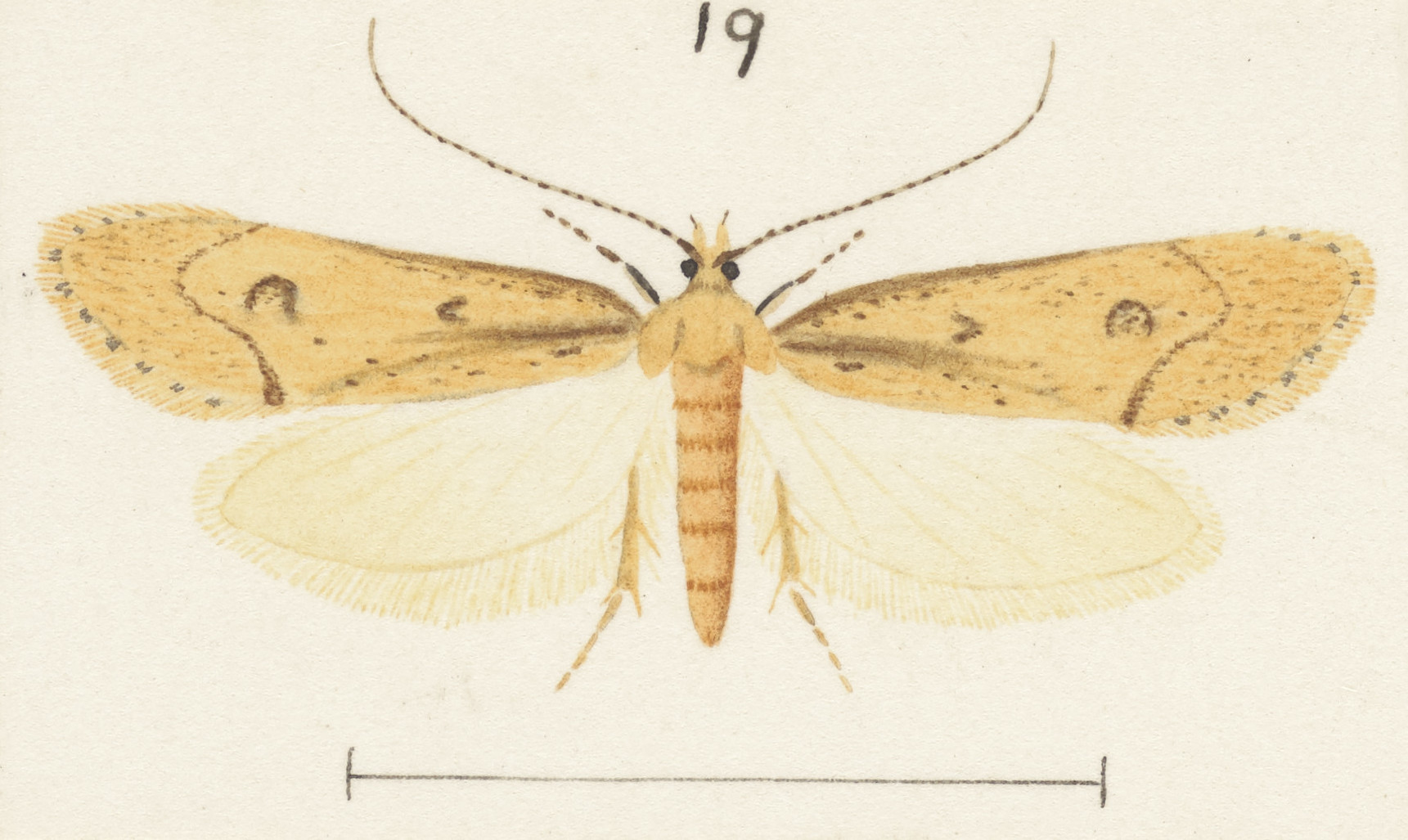
Male

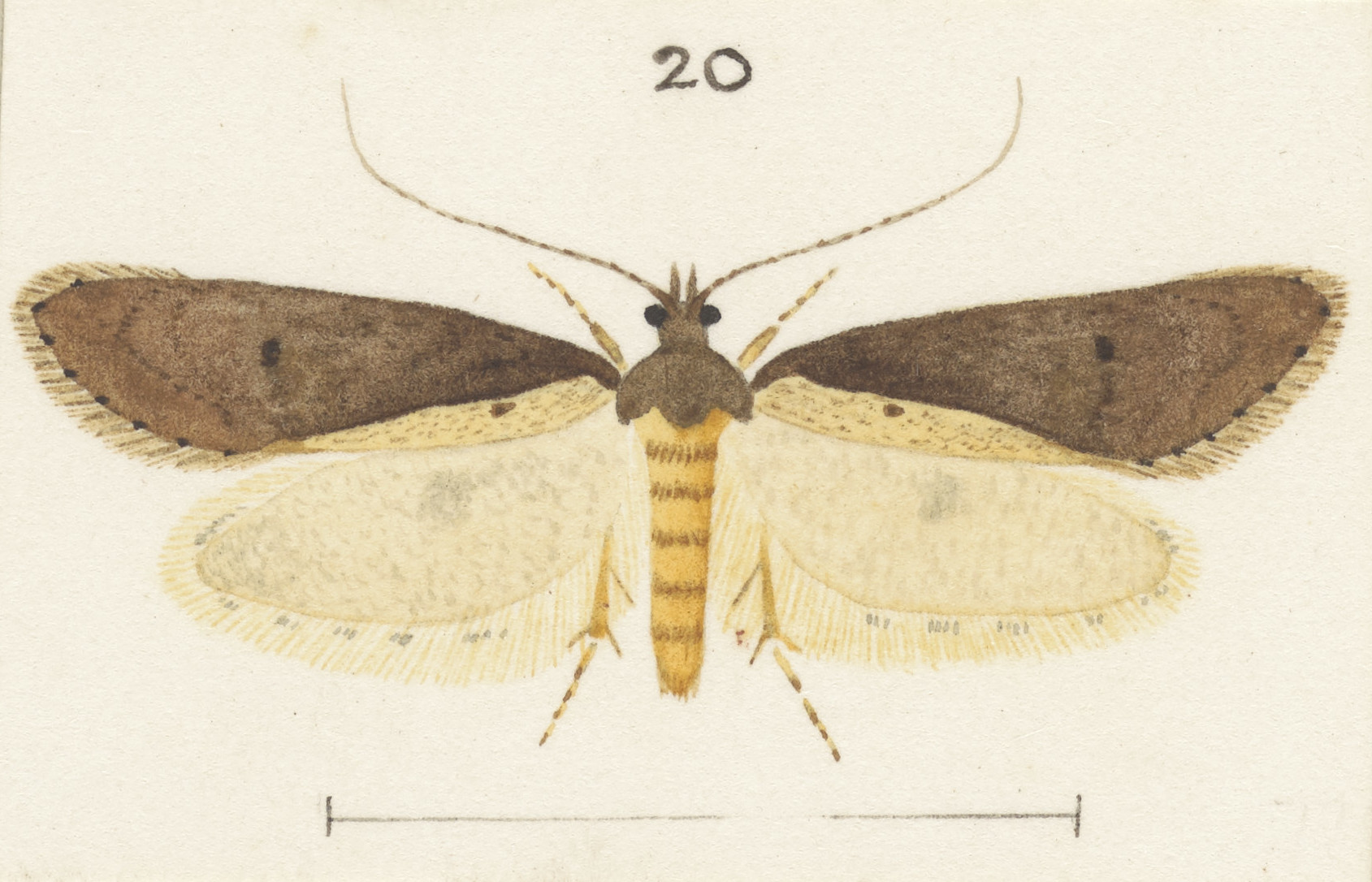
Male

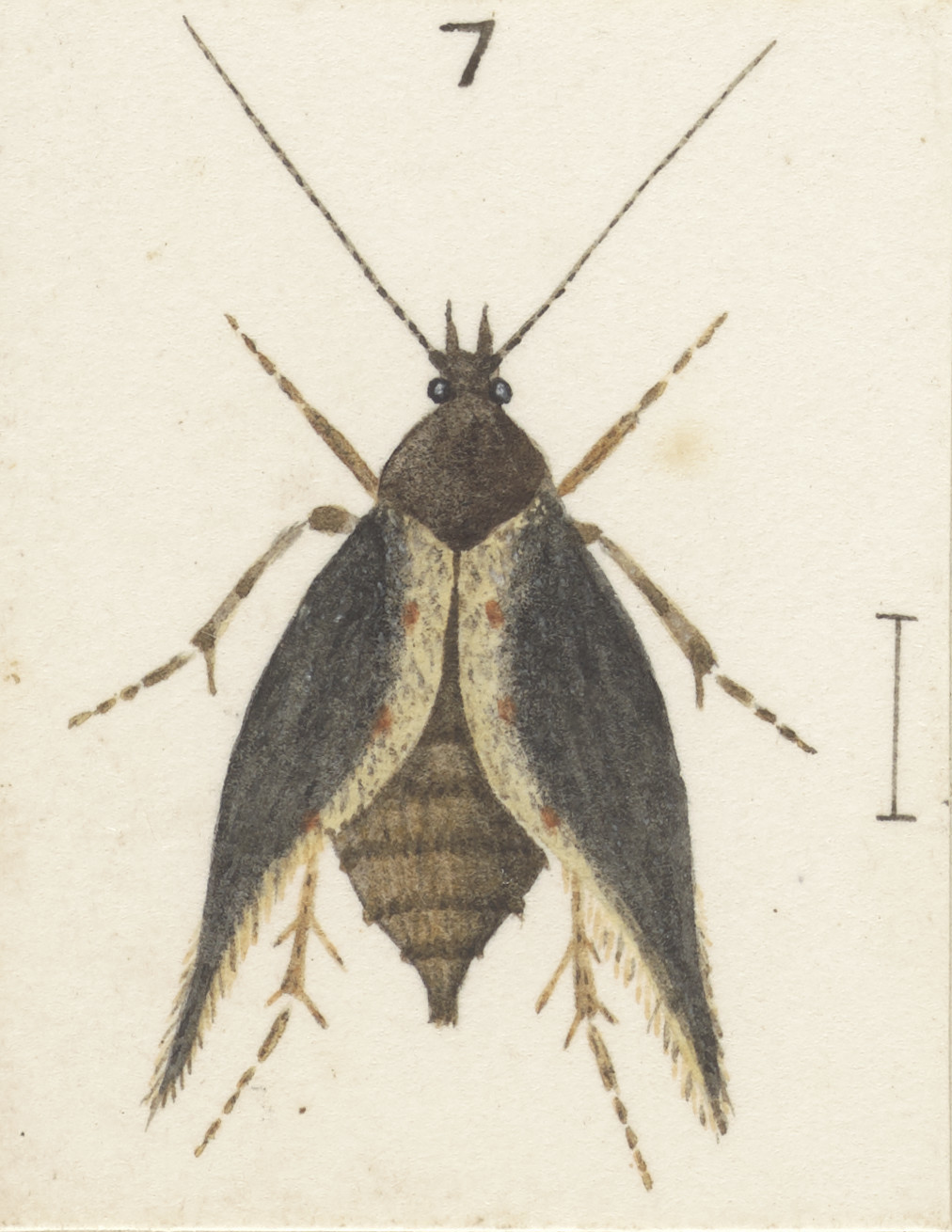
Female

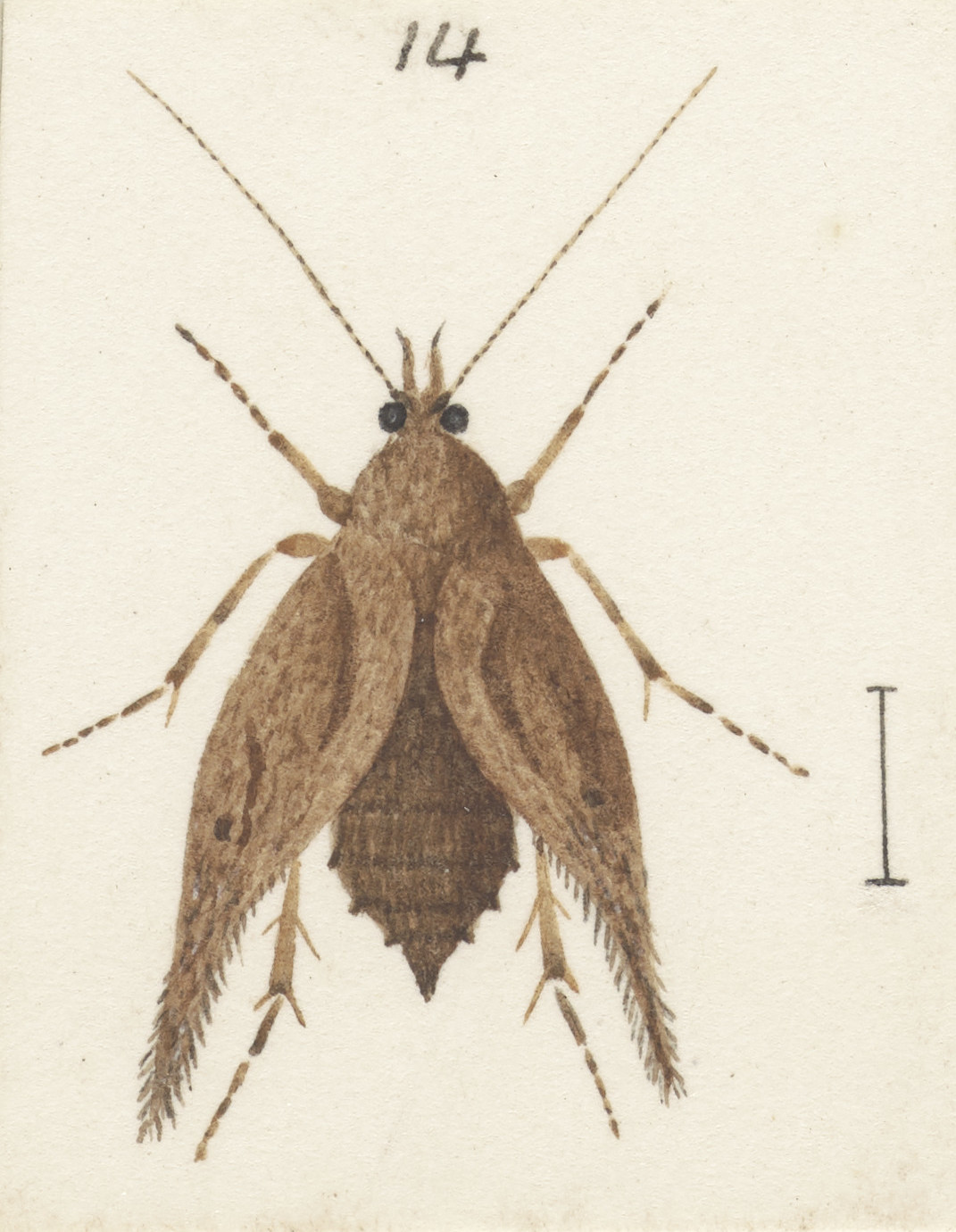
Female

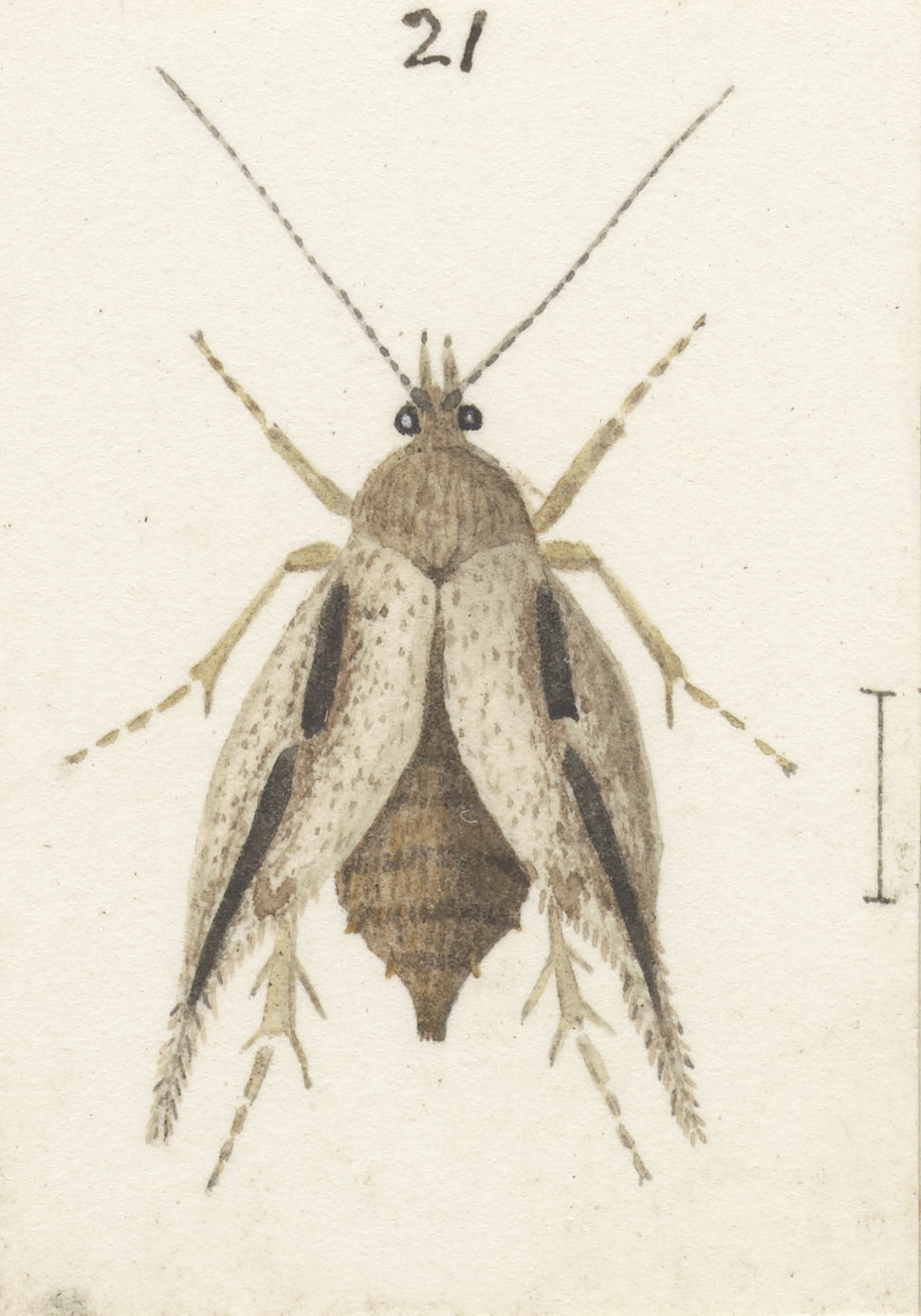
Female

== Distribution ==
This species is endemic to New Zealand. It has been observed in the southern parts of the North Island and in the South Island.

== Behaviour ==
Adults have been observed in August to October. Both the female and the male of the species can be found on cold winter nights resting on fences.
