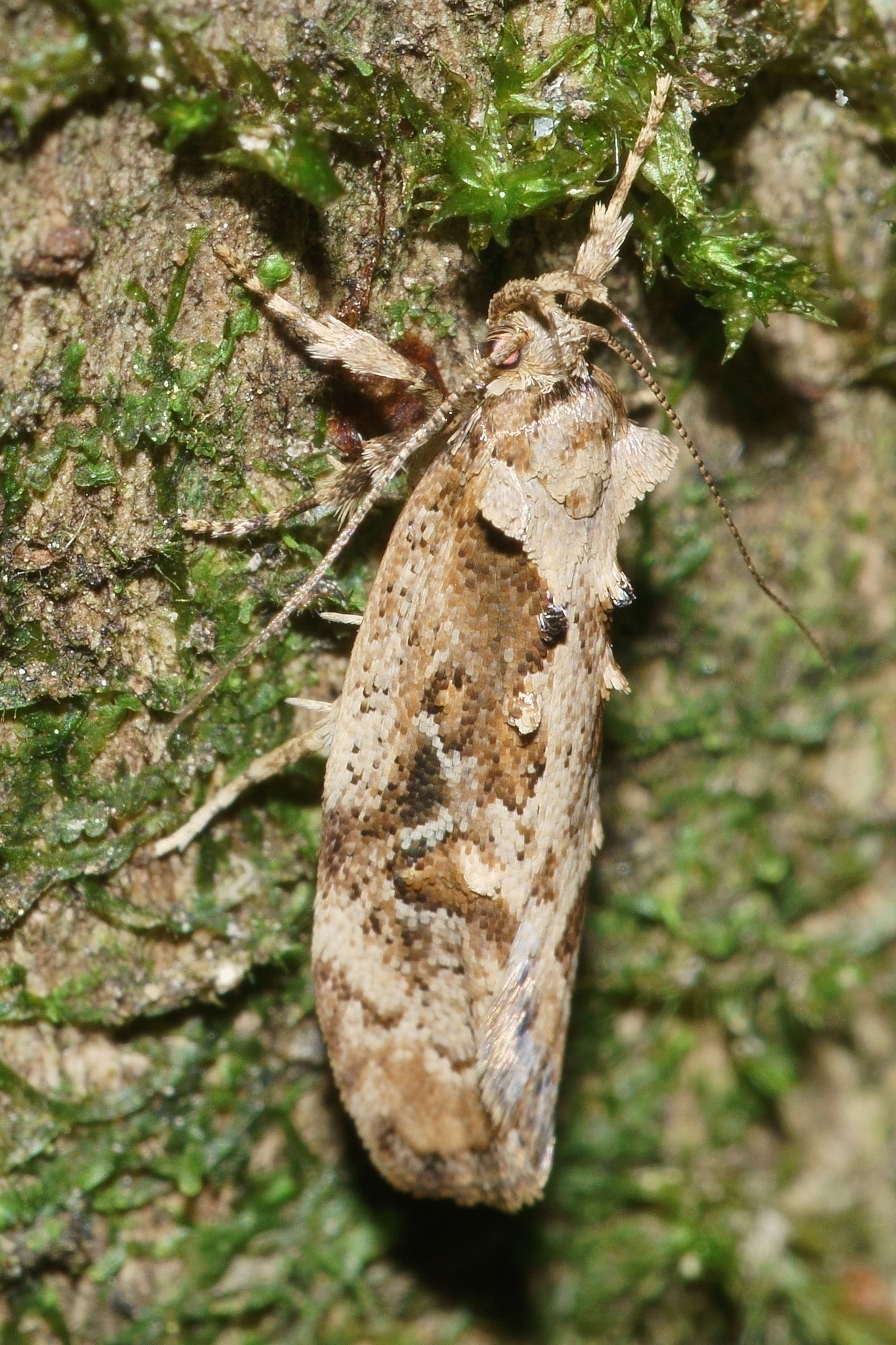
- Male
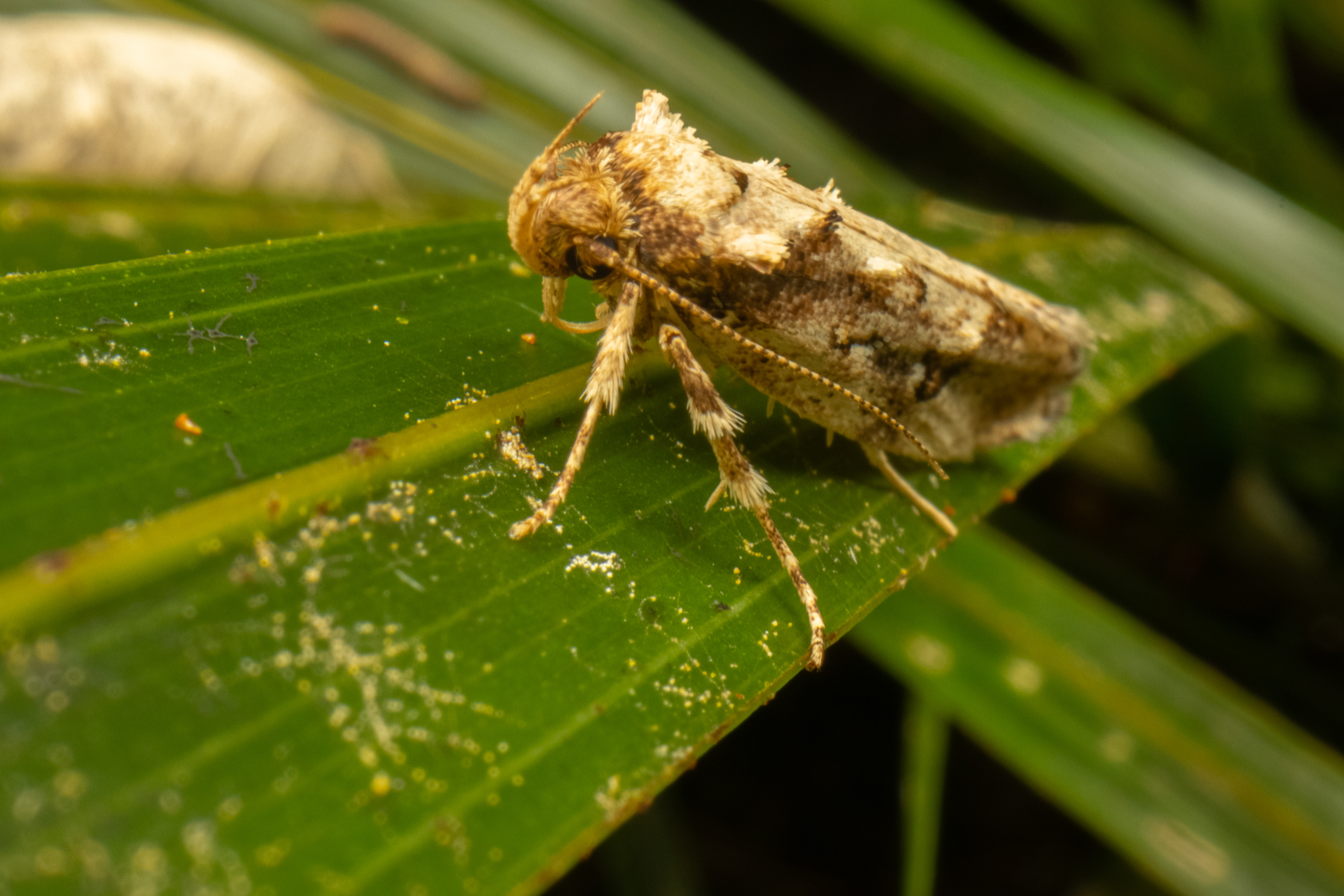
- Female

Scientific classification
- Kingdom: Animalia
- Phylum: Arthropoda
- Class: Insecta
- Order: Lepidoptera
- Family: Oecophoridae
- Genus: Atomotricha
- Species: A. isogama

Binomial name
- Atomotricha isogama Meyrick, 1909

= Atomotricha isogama =

Species of moth endemic to New Zealand

Atomotricha isogama is a moth in the family Oecophoridae. It was first described by Edward Meyrick in 1909. This species is endemic to New Zealand and has been observed in the North and South Islands. Larvae are leaf litter feeders and have been recorded as emerging in the New Zealand spring. Adults have been observed on the wing from July to January.

== Taxonomy ==
This species was first described by Edward Meyrick in 1909 using two specimens collected in Wellington by George Hudson. In 1927 Arthur Philpott studied the male genitalia of this species. The male lectotype specimen is held at the Natural History Museum, London.

== Description ==
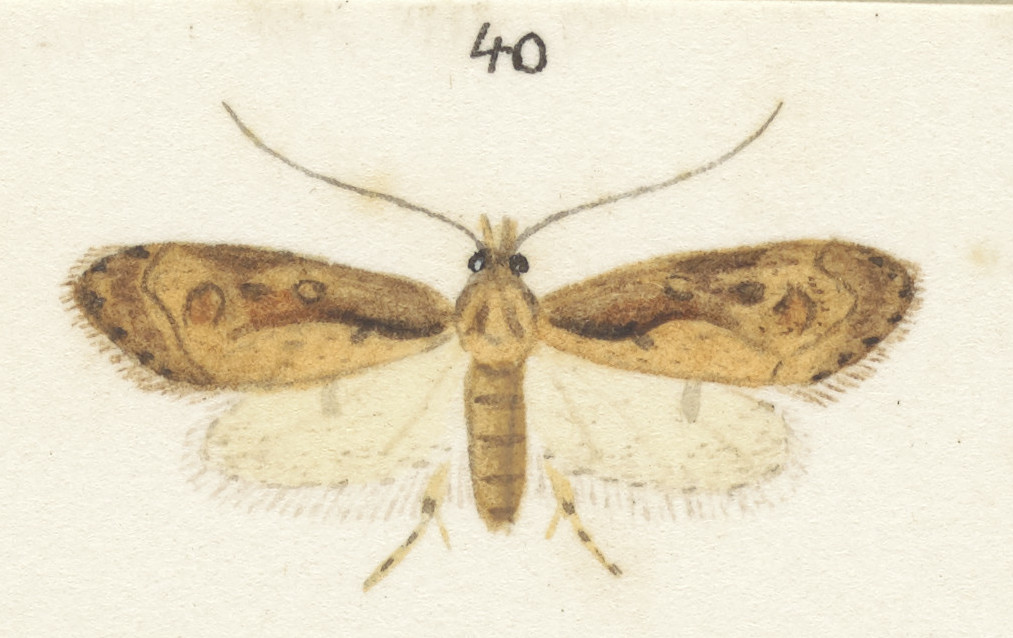
Illustration of A. isogama by Hudson.

Meyrick first described this species as follows:

♂♀. 23 mm. Head and thorax whitish-ochreous, in ♂ more brownish-tinged. Palpi whitish-ochreous, externally with a few scattered dark-fuscous scales. Antennae whitish-ochreous, obscurely ringed with dark fuscous. Abdomen whitish-ochreous, in ♂ more brownish, dorsally suffused with brassy-golden except on margins of segments. Forewings elongate, costa moderately arched, apex obtuse, termen very obliquely rounded; whitish-ochreous, with a few scattered dark-fuscous scales, in ♂ mostly suffused with brownish except on dorsal streak; a broad pale dorsal streak from base to tornus, upper edge prominent near base, where there is a tuft of scales, and about middle of dorsum; some dark-fuscous suffusion extending above this streak from base to 3/5 of disc, and thence upwards to costa; stigmata round, whitish-ochreous, edged with dark fuscous, plical obliquely beyond first discal; an angulated dark-fuscous line or series of dots from a of costa to tornus : cilia ochreous-whitish, in 3- irrorated with grey, basal third barred with fuscous. Hind wings very pale whitish-ochreous; a cloudy round fuscous discal spot; apex and lower half of termen suffused with fuscous irroration; cilia ochreous-whitish, round apex and on lower half of termen with a suffused fuscous shade.

The female of this species has fully developed wings. As an adult moth this species is variable in the colour intensity of its forewings, with some specimens being yellow-ochreous in colour.

== Distribution ==
This species is endemic to New Zealand. It has been observed in both the North and South Islands.

== Life cycle ==
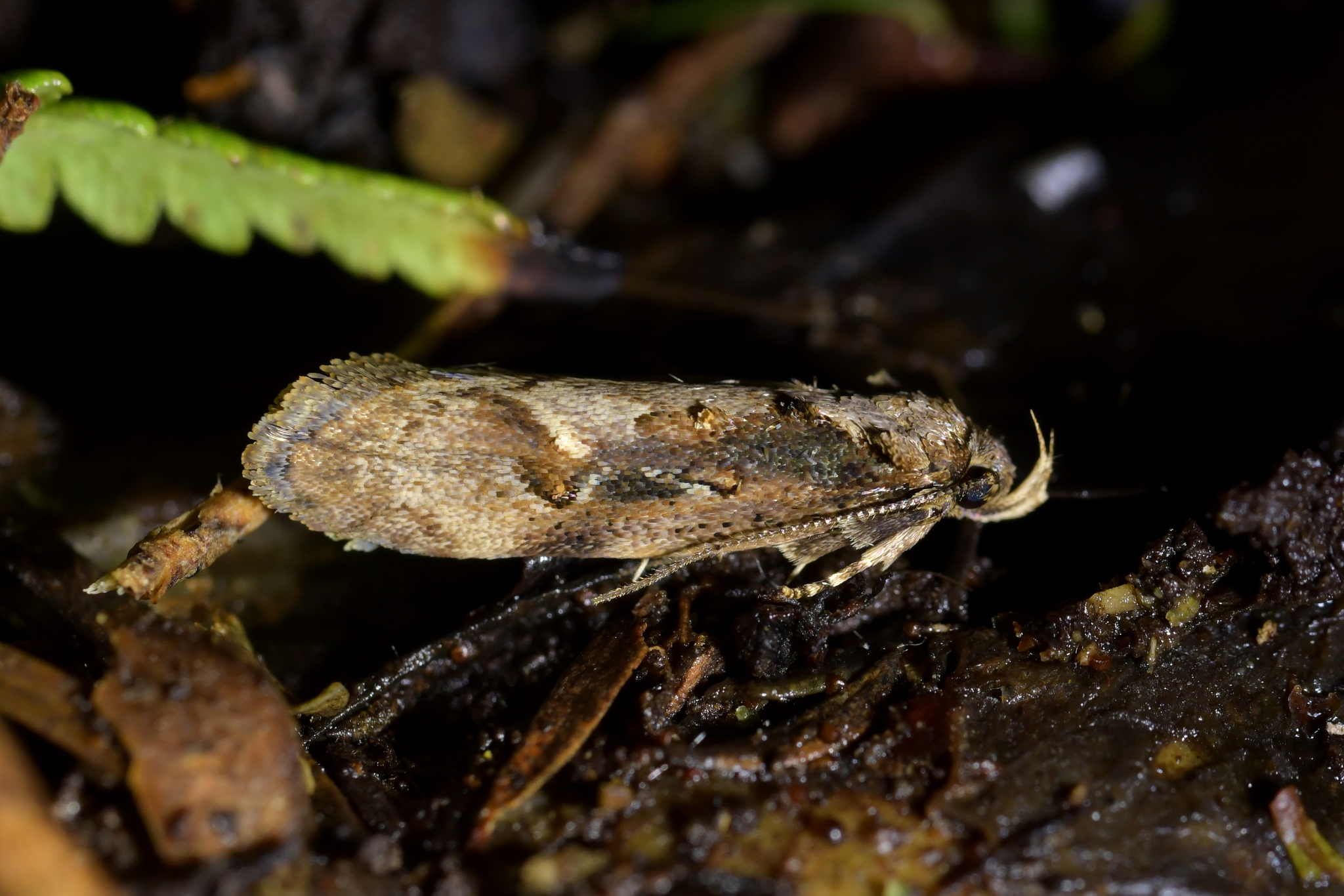
A. isogama.

The larvae of this species have been recorded as emerging in the New Zealand spring and attain their full size of over 2.5 mm in length by autumn. Adults of this species have been observed on the wing from July until January.

== Behaviour ==
Hudson regarded the adults of A. isogama as being sluggish and noted that the species frequented urban gardens and cultivated plants. During the day the adult moth can be found resting on tree trunks or fences, often on the underside of structures almost touching the ground. They have been observed having entered houses and have a habit of drowning in open containers filled with water.

== Hosts ==
The larvae of this species feed on leaf litter.
