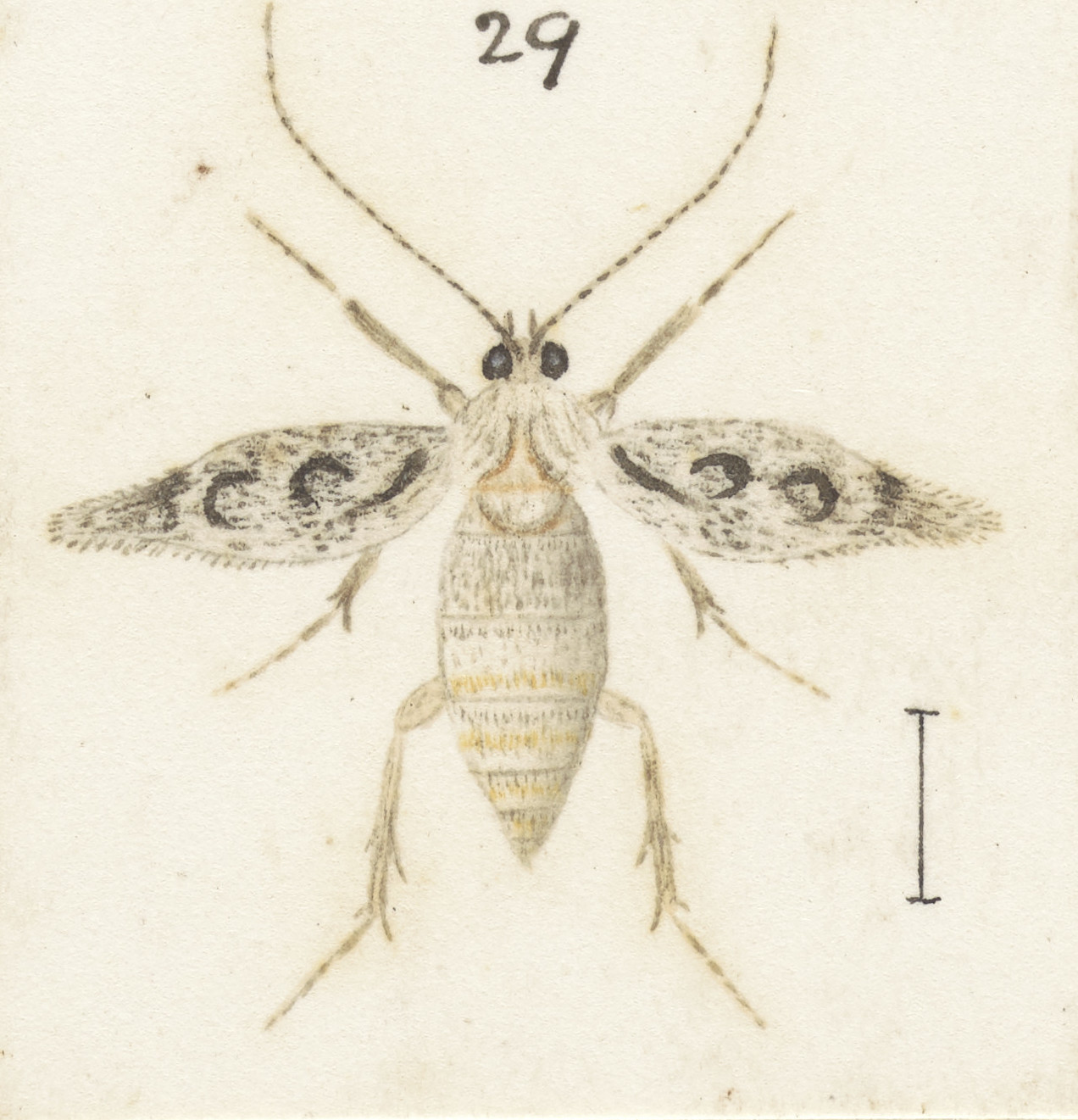
- Illustration of female
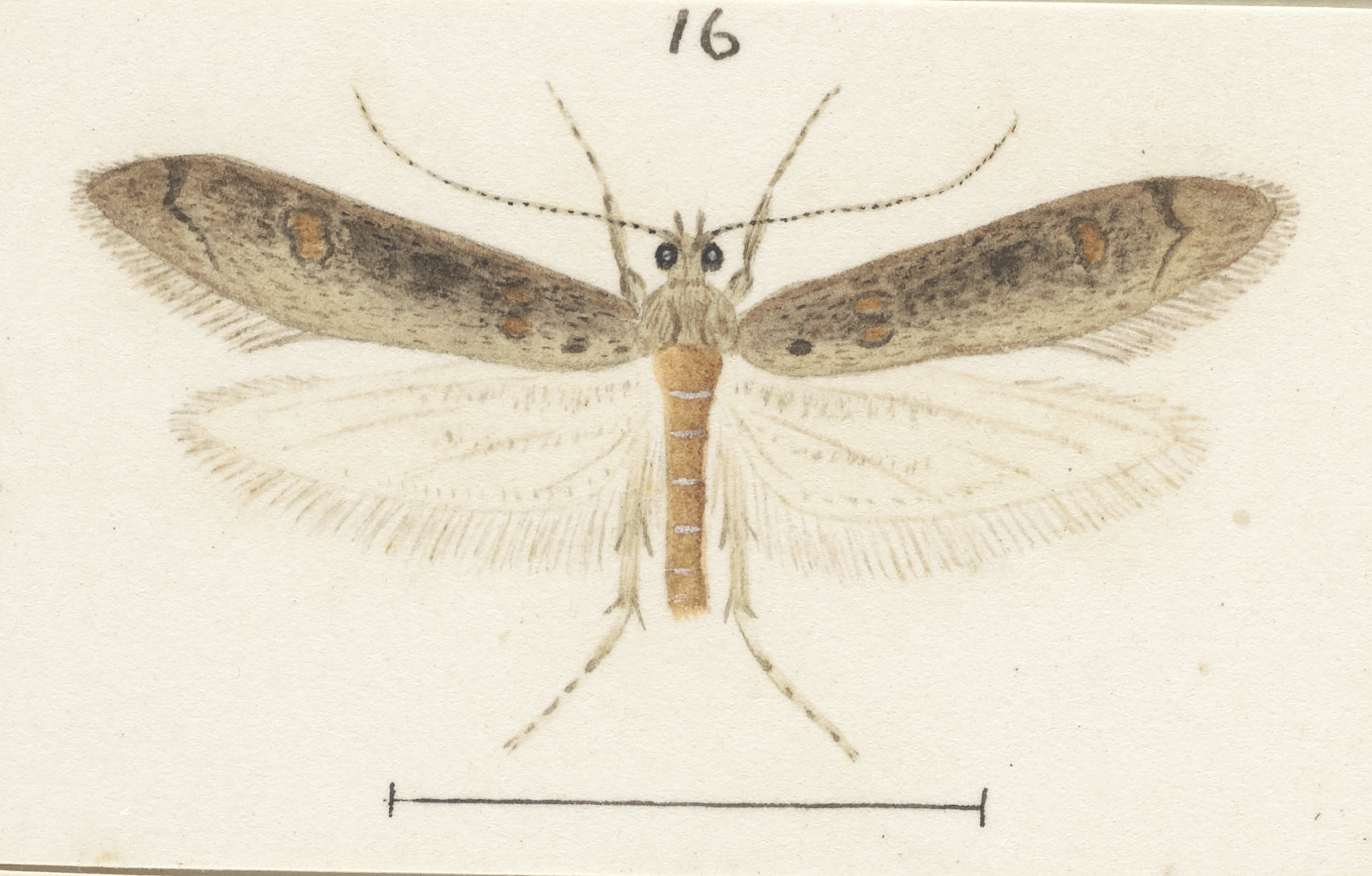
- Illustration of male

Scientific classification
- Kingdom: Animalia
- Phylum: Arthropoda
- Class: Insecta
- Order: Lepidoptera
- Family: Oecophoridae
- Genus: Atomotricha
- Species: A. oeconoma

Binomial name
- Atomotricha oeconoma Meyrick, 1914

= Atomotricha oeconoma =

Species of moth endemic to New Zealand

Atomotricha oeconoma is a moth in the family Oecophoridae first described by Edward Meyrick in 1914. It is endemic to New Zealand and has been observed at Mount Taranaki, Wellington and in Dunedin. The adults emerge in June. The female adult is semi-apterous and is incapable of flight.

== Taxonomy ==
This species was first described by Edward Meyrick in 1914 using three specimens collected in August in Karori by George Hudson. Hudson discussed and illustrated this species in his 1928 book The Butterflies and Moths of New Zealand. The male lectotype specimen is held at Natural History Museum, London.

== Description ==
Meyrick described this species as follows:

♂. 23 mm. Head whitish-ochreous. Palpi with second joint fuscous, not reaching base of antennae, scales roughly projecting beneath towards apex, terminal joint sprinkled with fuscous. Antennal joints thrice as long as their apical width, ciliations 5. Thorax fuscous. Abdomen whitish-ochreous. Forewings elongate, narrow towards base, hardly dilated, costa gently arched, apex tolerably pointed, termen nearly straight, very oblique; fuscous, mixed with grey in disc; dorsum suffused with pale ochreous towards base, edged by a blackish raised dot at 1/5 of wing; stigmata undefined, pale ochreous, plical nearly beneath first discal : cilia fuscous sprinkled with whitish-ochreous, base spinkled with blackish. Hindwings pale whitish-ochreous, suffused with pale grey except towards apex and posterior part of costa; cilia ochreous-whitish. ♀. 9-10 mm. Forewings ovate-lanceolate; fuscous suffusedly mixed with darker, especially towards base; dorsal area suffused with whitish-ochreous towards base; second discal stigma represented by a raised ochreous tuft edged with dark fuscous. Hindwings rudimentary.

The female of the species is semi-apterous and is incapable of flight.

== Distribution ==
A. oeconoma is endemic to New Zealand. It has been observed in its type locality of Wellington, at Mount Taranaki and in Dunedin.

== Behaviour ==
The adults of this species appear in June and are unusual in that they emerge during the winter months. Both the female and the male of the species can be found on cold nights resting on fences. A. oeconoma has been beaten from tōtara.
