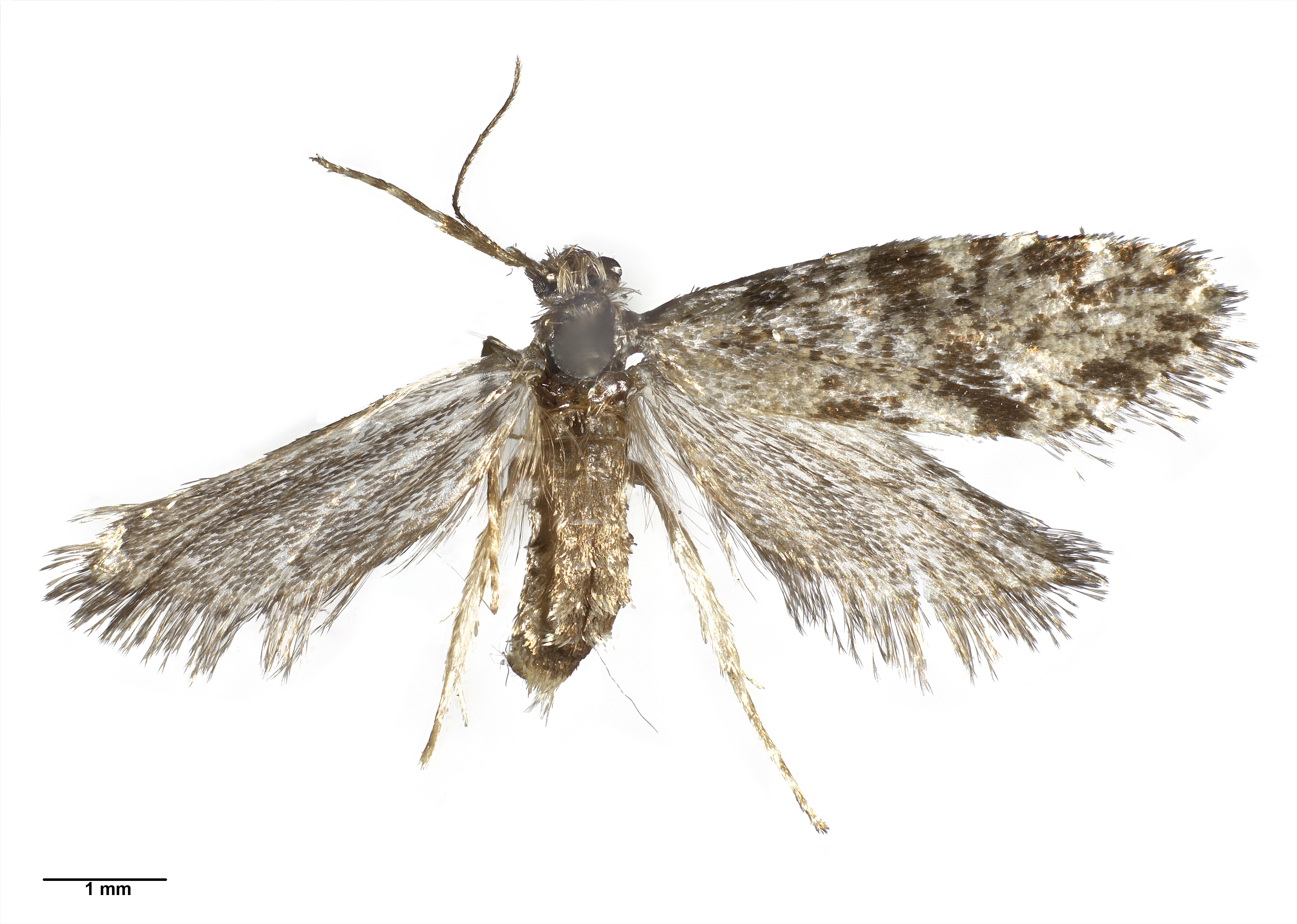
- Holotype

Scientific classification
- Domain: Eukaryota
- Kingdom: Animalia
- Phylum: Arthropoda
- Class: Insecta
- Order: Lepidoptera
- Family: Psychidae
- Genus: Mallobathra
- Species: M. cataclysma

Binomial name
- Mallobathra cataclysma Clarke, 1934

= Mallobathra cataclysma =

Species of moth

Mallobathra cataclysma is a moth of the family Psychidae. It was described by Charles Edwin Clarke in 1934. This species is endemic to New Zealand and has been observed in Otago. Adults are on the wing in January and have been collected just before sunrise at the bushline in native Nothofagus forest.

== Taxonomy ==
This species was first described by Charles Edwin Clarke in 1934 using one specimen collected at the bushline at Harris Saddle, upper Routeburn River, in January. George Hudson discussed this species in his 1939 book A supplement to the butterflies and moths of New Zealand. Hudson was of the opinion that the female holotype for M. cataclysma agreed with the female specimens in his collection of M. lapidosa and so synonymised that name. However J. S. Dugdale recognised M. cataclysma as a separate species in his 1988 annotated catalogue of New Zealand lepidopteria. The female holotype is held the Auckland War Memorial Museum.

== Description ==
Clarke described this species as follows:

♂ 9 mm. Head and palpi grey ochreous. Thorax grey fuscous, abdomen fuscous. Antennae grey fuscous, ciliations 2. Forewings elongate, costa arched, apex acutely rounded, termen oblique; very pale ochreous with fuscous markings and irroration, the most distinct at about ½ on costa, others at ⅔ broken and irrorated, distinct on dorsum; others across from near edge of termen. Cilia pale. Hindwings grey; cilia pale grey.

This species differs from M. metrosema as it is paler in colour as well as being larger in size. M. cataclysma differs from M. scoriota as it is smaller, is again paler, has a different shape to the markings on its forewings and differs in the length of antennal ciliations.

== Distribution ==
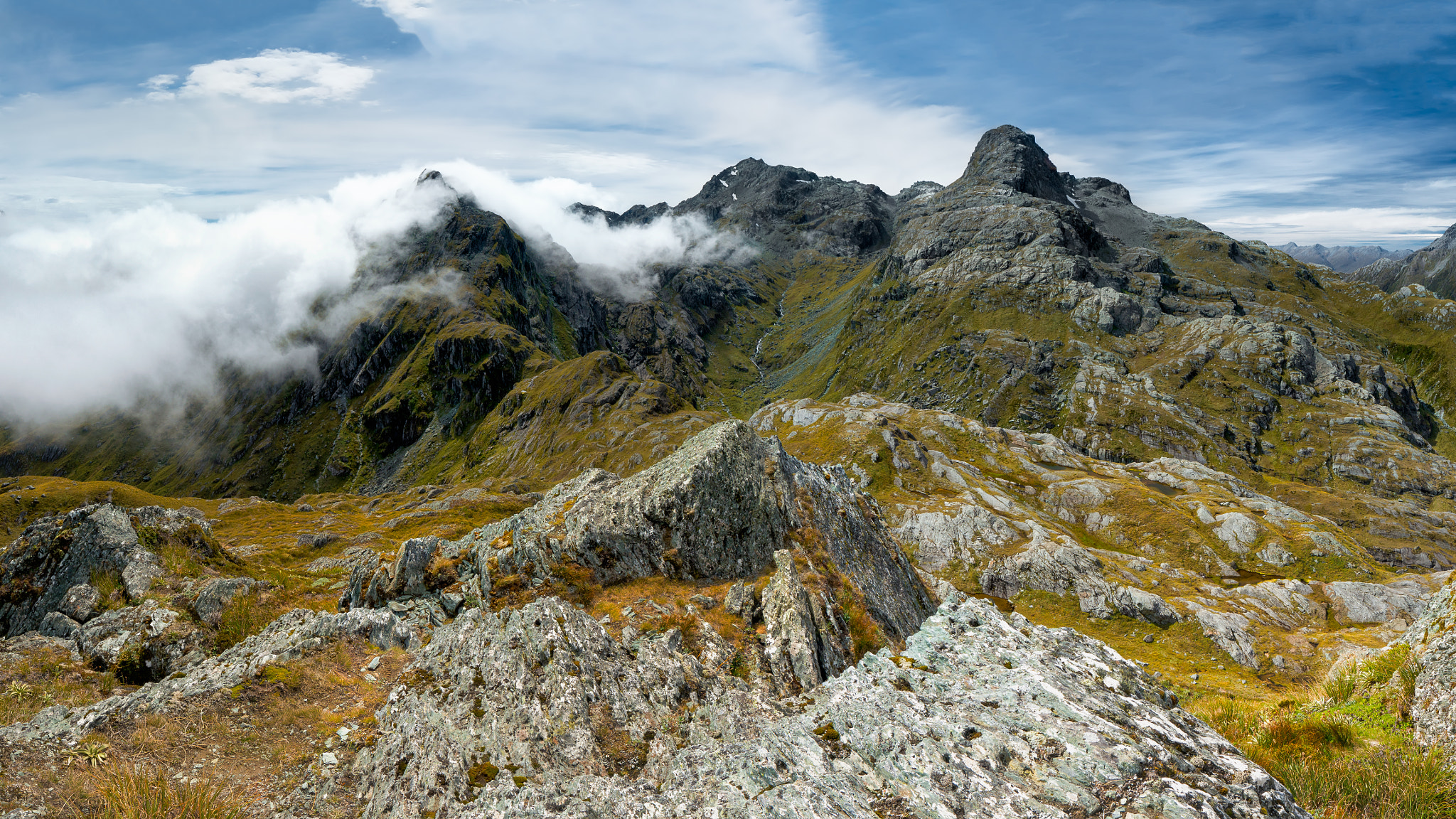
Harris Saddle, type locality of this species

M. cataclysma is endemic to New Zealand. It has been observed in Otago.

== Behaviour ==
An adult of this species has been collected walking on the bark of species in the genus Nothofagus. Adults of this species have been collected just before the sun rises and are on the wing in January.
