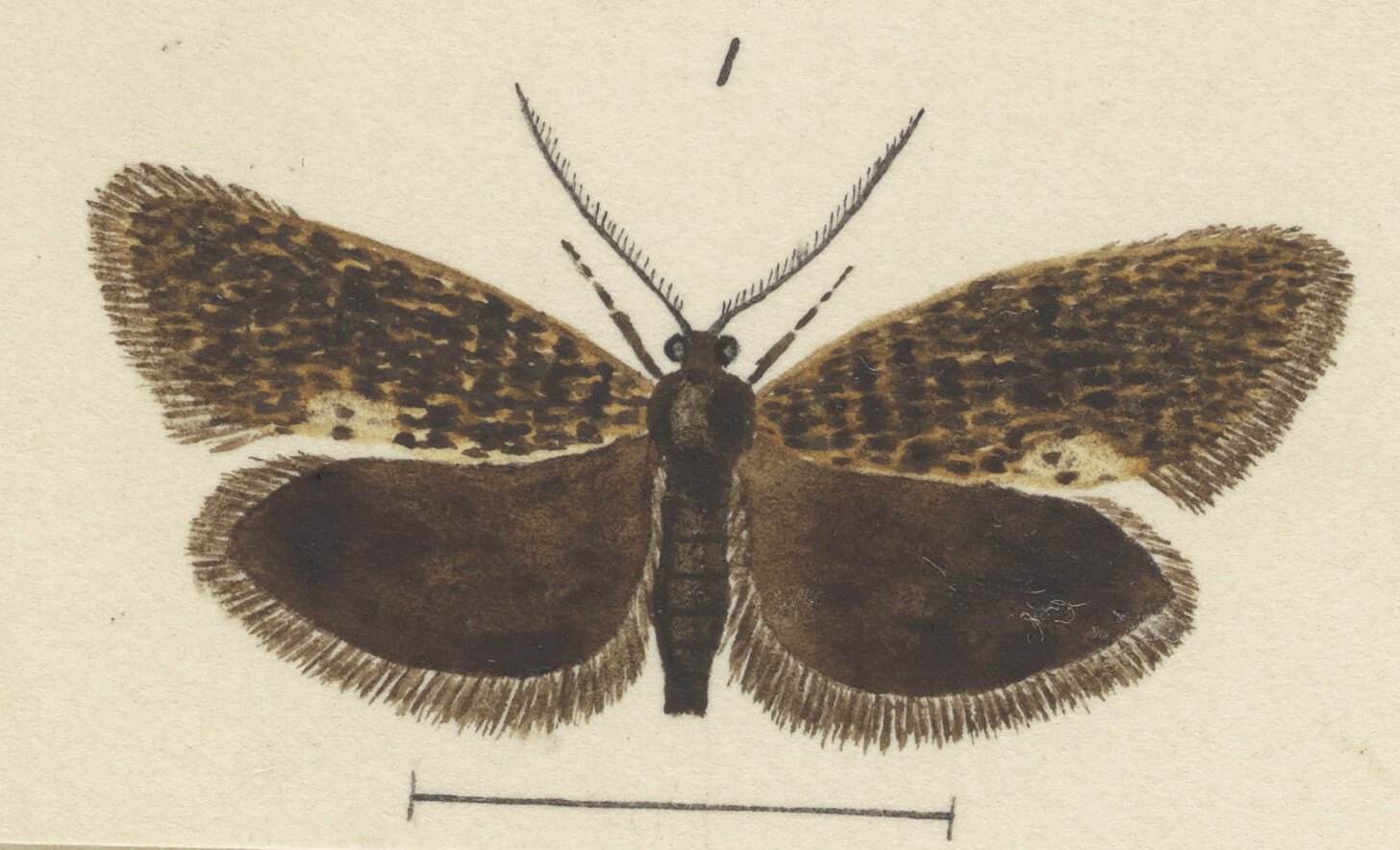
- Illustration of male

Scientific classification
- Domain: Eukaryota
- Kingdom: Animalia
- Phylum: Arthropoda
- Class: Insecta
- Order: Lepidoptera
- Family: Psychidae
- Genus: Mallobathra
- Species: M. tonnoiri

Binomial name
- Mallobathra tonnoiri Philpott, 1927

= Mallobathra tonnoiri =

Species of moth

Mallobathra tonnoiri is a moth of the family Psychidae. It was described by Alfred Philpott in 1927. This species is endemic to New Zealand and has been observed in the South Island. Adults are on the wing in December.

== Taxonomy ==
This species was first described by Alfred Philpott in 1927 using a male specimen collected by André Léon Tonnoir at Lake Brunner in December. M. tonnoiri was discussed and illustrated by George Hudson in 1939. J. S. Dugdale confirmed the placement of this species in the genus Mallobathra in 1971. The male holotype specimen is held at the Canterbury Museum.

== Description ==
Philpott described this species as follows:

♂. 16 mm. Head, thorax and abdomen blackish-fuscous. Antennae blackish-fuscous, ciliations in male 2 ½. Forewings, costa moderately arched, subsinuate, apex rounded, termen oblique; dark brownish-fuscous obscurely strigulated with ochreous; an undefined patch of paler ochreous on dorsum near base; a large spot of whitish-ochreous on dorsum beyond middle; fringes dark purplish-fuscous. Hindwings and fringes dark fuscous with purplish sheen.

This species is similar in appearance to M. strigulata but lacks the large dark dorsal patch on the wings of M.strigulata. It is also similar in appearance to M. fenwicki but is larger and darker.

== Distribution ==
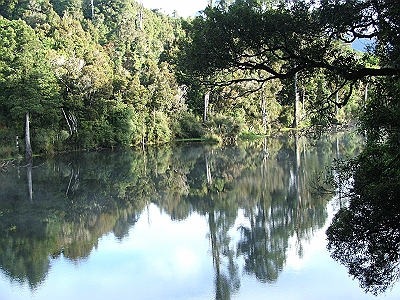
Lake Brunner, type locality of M. tonnoiri.

This species is endemic to New Zealand. This species has been observed in the West Coast and the Wellington regions and has also been collected at Homer.

== Behaviour ==
Adults are on the wing in December.
