= Mallobathra homalopa =

Scientific classification
- Kingdom: Animalia
- Phylum: Arthropoda
- Clade: Pancrustacea
- Class: Insecta
- Order: Lepidoptera
- Family: Psychidae
- Genus: Mallobathra
- Species: M. homalopa

Binomial name
- Mallobathra homalopa Meyrick, 1891

Species of moth endemic to New Zealand

Mallobathra homalopa is a moth of the family Psychidae. It was first described by Edward Meyrick in 1891. This species is endemic to New Zealand and has been observed in the North and South Islands. M. homalopa frequents open glades amongst scrubby native forest including Plagianthus shrubland. The larvae are likely litter leaf feeders. In August, when fully grown, they construct cases that they place under logs. The adults are day flying and are on the wing from October until December. The male is most active in hot afternoon sunshine while the female is only infrequently observed as they are reluctant fliers and fall to earth when disturbed.

== Taxonomy ==
This species was first described by Edward Meyrick in 1891 using a specimen collected by George Hudson in Wellington. In 1927 Alfred Philpott discussed and illustrated the male genitalia of this species. Hudson discussed and illustrated this species in his 1928 book The butterflies and moths of New Zealand. John S. Dugdale in 1971 confirmed the placement of this species in the genus Mallobathra. In 1974 Dugdale discussed and illustrated the female genitalia of this species. In 1988 Dugdale stated male holotype could not be located at the Natural History Museum, London.

== Description ==
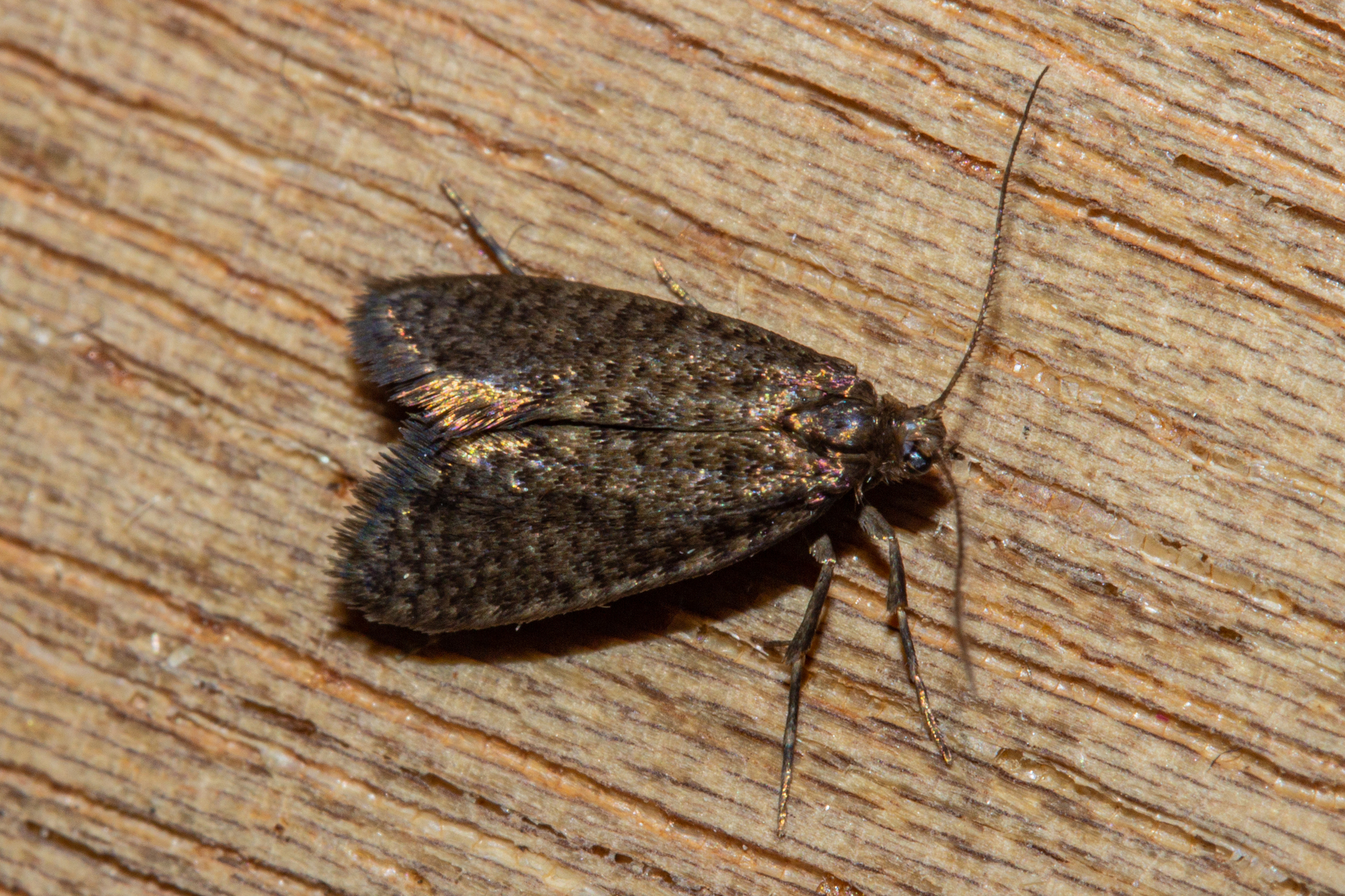
Live moth.

Illustration of male by Hudson.

Meyrick originally described the male of this species as follows:

♂. 14 mm. Head, palpi, antennae, thorax, and abdomen dark fuscous ; palpi short ; antennal ciliations 3. Legs dark fuscous, ringed with whitish-ochreous. Forewings elongate, moderate, costa gently arched, sinuate in middle, apex rounded, hindmargin very obliquely, slightly rounded ; dark fuscous ; a subquadrate pale brownish-ochreous spot on inner margin before middle, and a smaller one before anal angle : cilia dark fuscous. Hind wings and cilia dark fuscous.

Hudson described the adults of this species as follows:

The expansion of the wings of the male is nearly 5/8 inch; of the female 1/2 inch. The fore-wings are bright bronzy-brown with strong coppery reflections; there are numerous small ill-defined darker brown spots tending to form transverse lines. The hind-wings are dark greyish-brown with strong coppery reflections. In the female the wings are narrower, the darker markings more distinct, and the hind-wings greyer, than in the male.

Adults are very similar in appearance to Mallobathra obscura which has been observed in Southland but differs as this latter species is slightly brighter in colour and proportionately broader-winged.

== Distribution ==
M. homalopa is endemic to New Zealand. It has been observed in the North and South Islands.

== Habitat ==
This species frequents open glades amongst scrubby native forest including Plagianthus shrubland.

== Life cycle and behaviour ==
The female has a large anal tuft that she uses to cover her eggs when first laid. The larvae are likely leaf litter feeders. When mature the larva constructs a case, about 1/2 inch long, covered with short fragments of dead grass and other litter, arranged rather irregularly, but mostly placed longitudinally. Three or four much longer pieces of grass are often attached to the case and this results in the case being very difficult to detect. When larva is fully grown, about the end of August, it attaches a case by its upper end to the under surface of a log. They prefer logs that do not rest evenly on the surface of the ground allowing air to reach the case. When attached in this manner the cases look exactly like little tufts of grass sticking to the log. The cases are often very abundant with as many as half a dozen being found underneath a single log.

The adults are on the wing from October until December. This species is day flying with the male being most active in hot afternoon sunshine. However the female of this species is seldom observed, are reluctant to fly and when disturbed, fall to earth.
