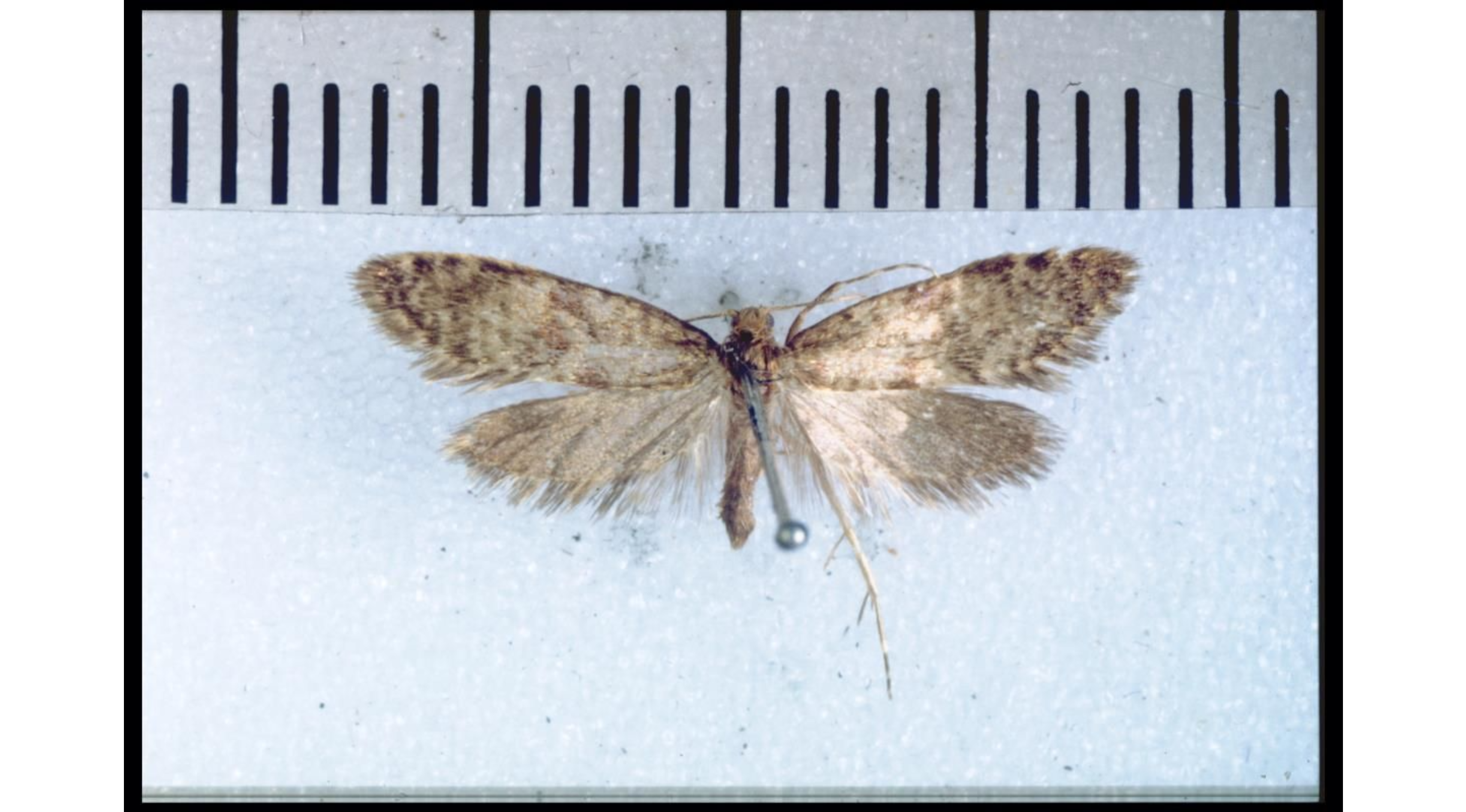
- Male holotype

Scientific classification
- Kingdom: Animalia
- Phylum: Arthropoda
- Class: Insecta
- Order: Lepidoptera
- Family: Psychidae
- Genus: Mallobathra
- Species: M. cana

Binomial name
- Mallobathra cana Philpott, 1927

= Mallobathra cana =

Species of moth

Mallobathra cana is a moth of the family Psychidae. It was first described by Alfred Philpott in 1927. This species is endemic to New Zealand and has been observed on Dun Mountain in the Nelson region. Adults have been observed on the wing in December.

== Taxonomy ==
This species was first described by Alfred Philpott in 1927 using two male specimens he collected at 3500 ft on the Dun Mountain in Nelson. George Hudson discussed and illustrated this species in his 1939 book A supplement to the butterflies and moths of New Zealand. The male holotype specimen is held at the New Zealand Arthropod Collection.

== Description ==
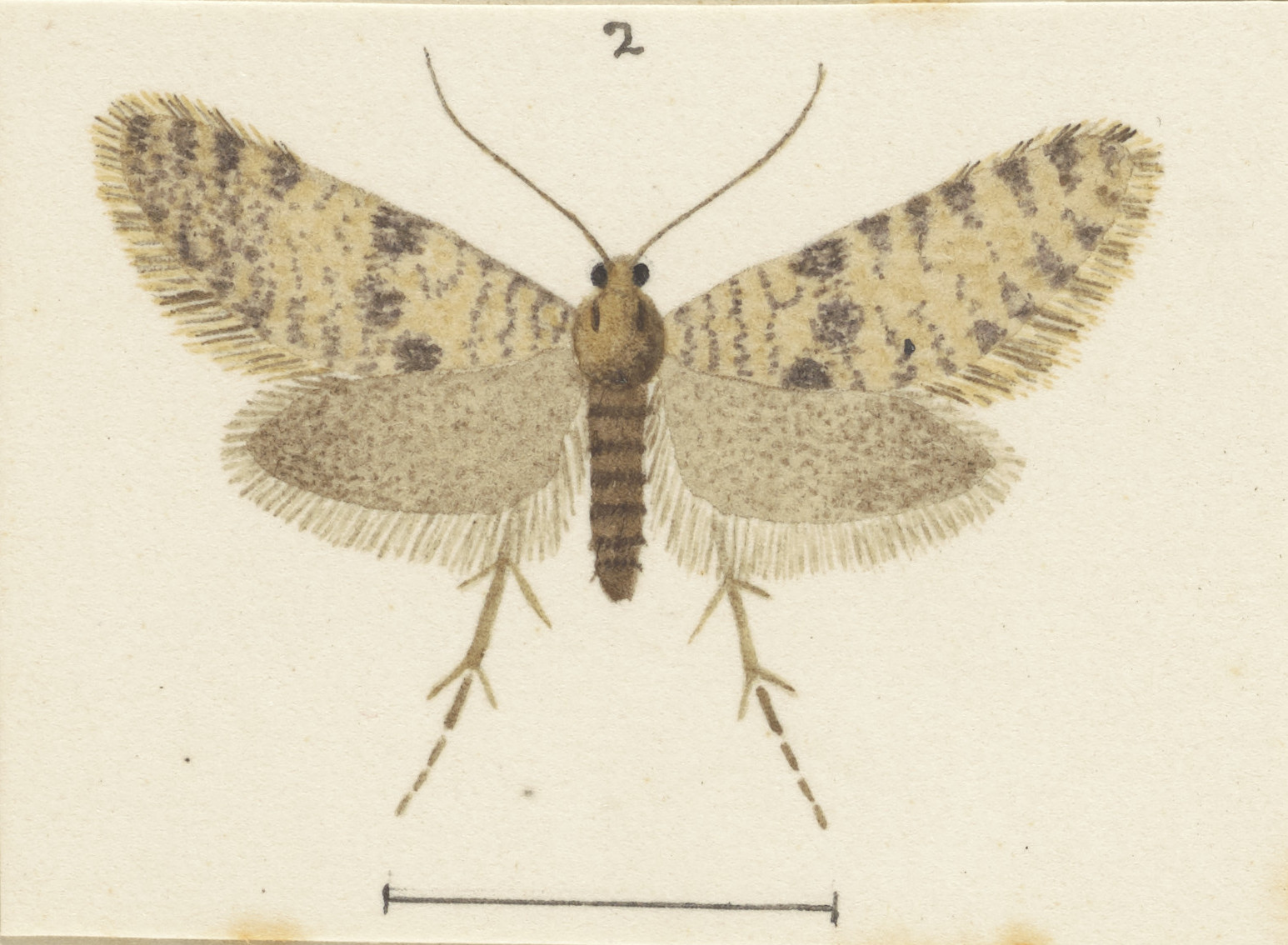
Illustration of male.

Philpott described this species as follows:

♂. 14–15 mm. Head and thorax ochreous-brown. Antennae ochreous, ciliations in male 3. Abdomen fuscous-brown. Legs fuscous mixed with ochreous, posterior pair more ochreous, all tarsi annulated with ochreous. Forewings elongate-triangular, costa moderately arched, apex round-pointed, termen strongly oblique; ochreous, covered with brown strigulae and with strong purplish-violet iridescence; the strigulae tend to form spots on apical half of costa and round termen; an indistinct brown spot on dorsum at ½; fringes fuscous mixed with ochreous. Hindwings and fringes greyish-fuscous with purplish-violet sheen.

== Distribution ==
This species is endemic to New Zealand. It has been observed in the Nelson region.

== Behaviour ==
Adults of this species have been observed on the wing in December.
