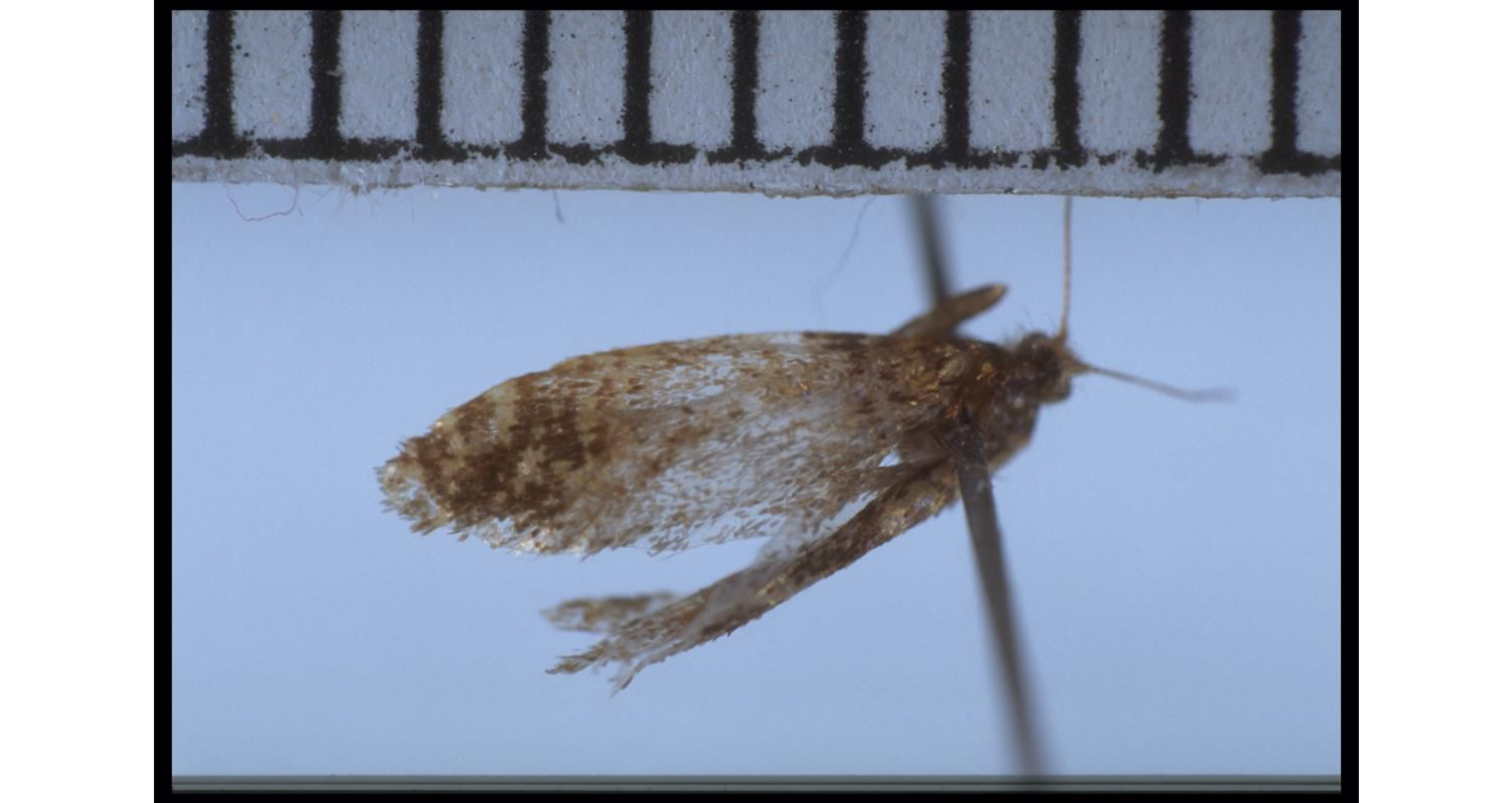
- Holotype specimen

Scientific classification
- Kingdom: Animalia
- Phylum: Arthropoda
- Class: Insecta
- Order: Lepidoptera
- Family: Psychidae
- Genus: Mallobathra
- Species: M. campbellica

Binomial name
- Mallobathra campbellica Dugdale, 1971

= Mallobathra campbellica =

Species of moth endemic to New Zealand

Mallobathra campbellica is a moth of the family Psychidae. This species is endemic to New Zealand and is found only on Campbell Island. The larvae of this species inhabit leaf litter while the adults can be found in sheltered clearings amongst scrub. Adults are on the wing in December and January.

== Taxonomy ==
This species was first described by John S. Dugdale in 1971. The female holotype specimen was collected by Guillermo Kuschel in January at Beeman Camp on Campbell Island and is held at the New Zealand Arthropod Collection.

== Description ==
Dugdale described the larvae of this species as follows:

D setae on 1st abdominal segment on two pinacula D1 (anterior, D1, D2 posterior); SV group tri-setose above each proleg; metathoracic posterior sternal setae closer together than anterior setae.

Dugdale described the adult female of this species as follows:

Head with slender yellow scales; forewings with patches of yellowish scales on a purplish brown, slightly iridescent ground, hindwings dark grey, abdomen dark grey, scent gland scales long, hair-like, crimped at mid-length, pale yellow. Length (vertex to wing tip): 7.4 mm.

== Distribution ==
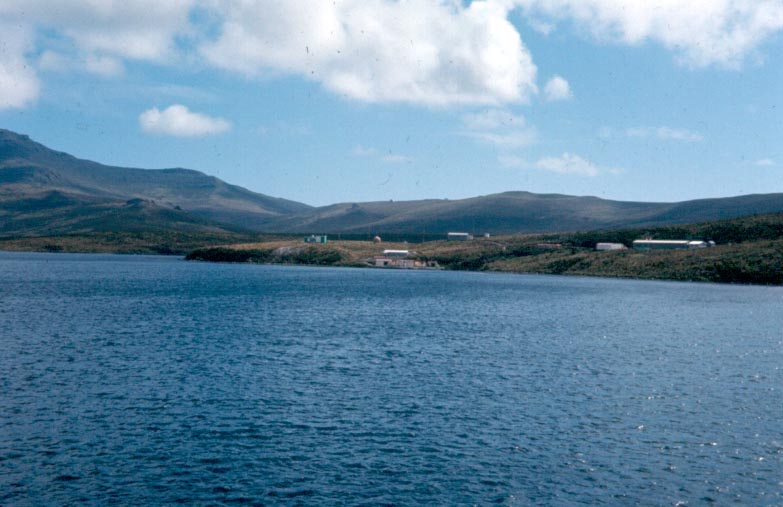
Beeman Cove, Campbell Island, type locality for M. campbellica.

This species is endemic to New Zealand and is found only on Campbell Island.

== Behaviour ==
The adults are on the wing in December and January.

== Habitat ==
The adults of this species inhabit sheltered clearings amongst scrub where as the larvae inhabit leaf litter.
