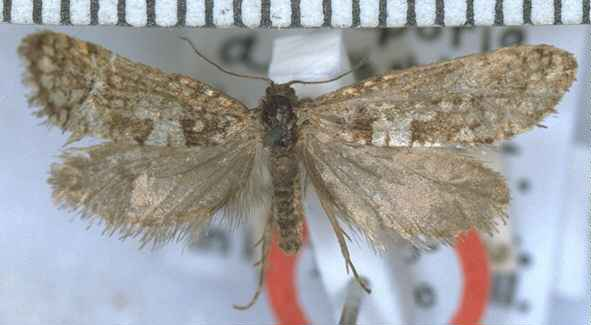
- Male lectotype

Scientific classification
- Kingdom: Animalia
- Phylum: Arthropoda
- Class: Insecta
- Order: Lepidoptera
- Family: Psychidae
- Genus: Mallobathra
- Species: M. aphrosticha

Binomial name
- Mallobathra aphrosticha Meyrick, 1912

Synonyms
- Talepora aphrostcha Meyrick, 1912; Talepora aphrosticha Meyrick, 1912

= Mallobathra aphrosticha =

Species of moth endemic to New Zealand

Mallobathra aphrosticha is a moth of the family Psychidae. This species is endemic to New Zealand and has been collected in Fiordland, Otago and Southland. The adults are on the wing in December and the female is semi-apterous.

== Taxonomy ==
This species was first described by Edward Meyrick in 1912 and named Telapora aphrostcha, a misspelling in the original publication. He used specimens collected by Alfred Philpott at Hump Ridge in Fiordland at an altitude of 3500 ft. Not long after publication, the spelling of aphrosticha was used in scientific literature to refer to this species. Dugdale discussed this misspelling stating that the appropriate spelling of the species name is aphrositcha as indicated by Mayrick's handwriting on a specimen label. In 1971 this species was placed within the genus Mallobathra. This name was confirmed by the New Zealand Inventory of Biodiversity.

== Description ==
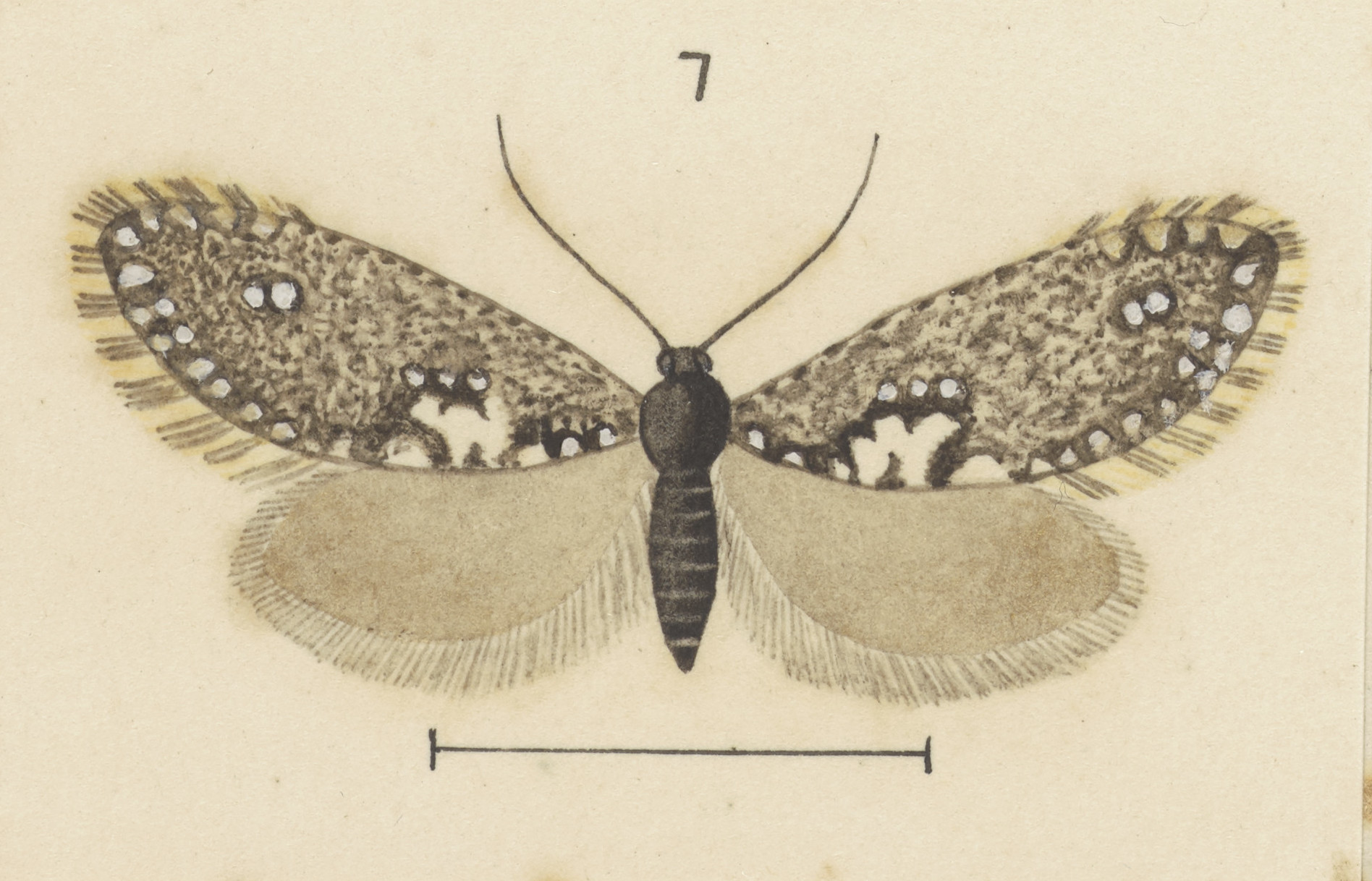
Illustration of a male M. aphrosticha by George Hudson.

Meyrick described the adults of this species as follows:

♂ 22 mm. Head, palpi, and antennae dark fuscous, antennal ciliations 2 1/2. Thorax dark fuscous, with several whitish dots posteriorly. Abdomen dark grey, somewhat whitish-mixed. Forewings elongate, rather narrow at base, posteriorly dilated, costa gently arched, apex obtuse, termen obliquely rounded; all veins separate; white, mixed with grey in disc and towards costa, coarsely reticulated throughout with dark fuscous; the white colour forms a more conspicuous quadrate spot on dorsum before middle, including a dark - fuscous dorsal strigula, and preceded and followed by irregular dark-fuscous spots : cilia fuscous, basal half spotted with white. Hindwings dark grey; cilia fuscous. ♀ apterous, active.

The female of this species is semi-apterous.

== Distribution ==
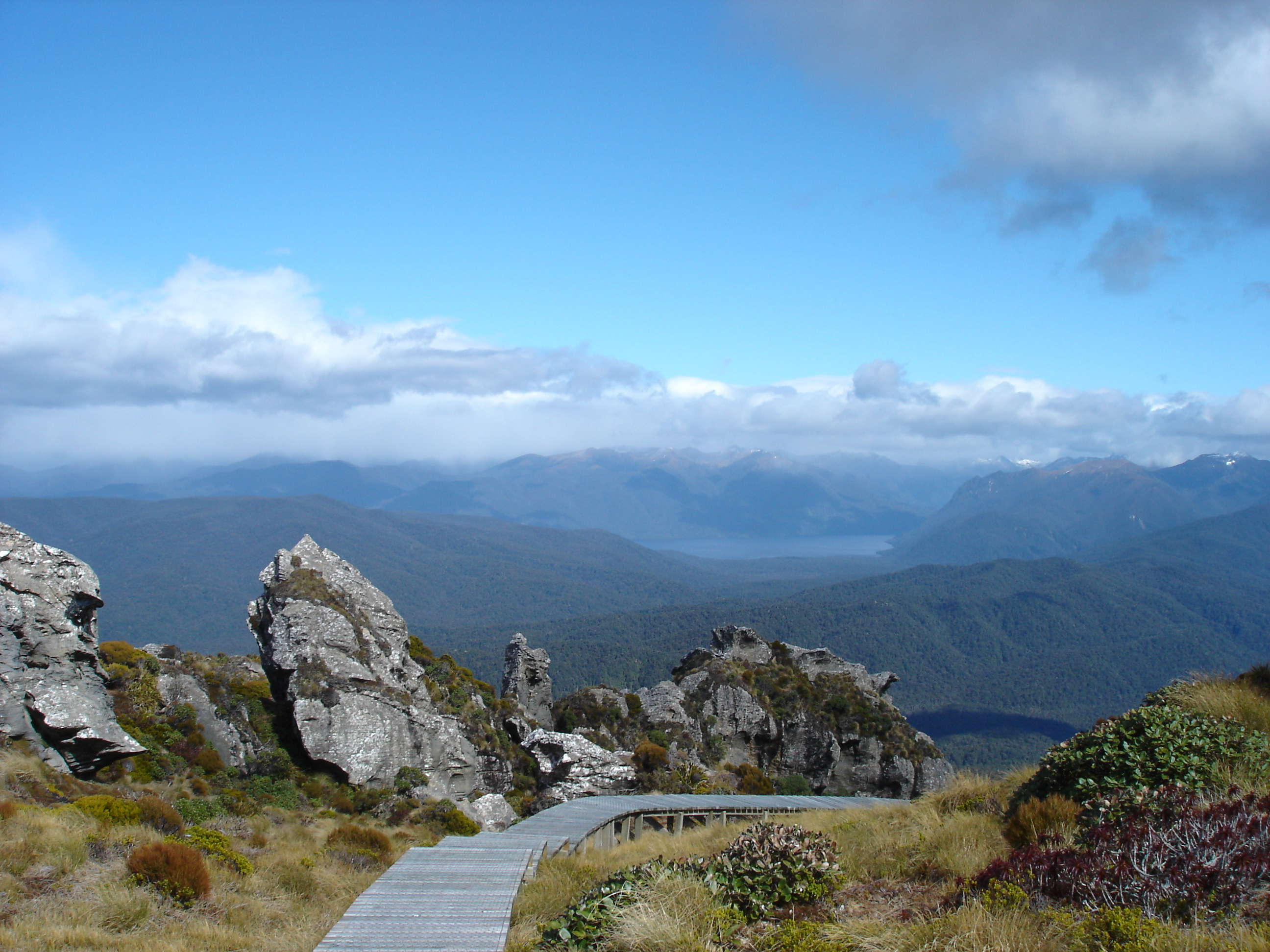
Hump Ridge Track, type locality of M. aphrosticha.

This species is endemic to New Zealand. It has been collected in Fiordland, Otago and Southland.

== Behaviour ==
This species is on the wing in December.
