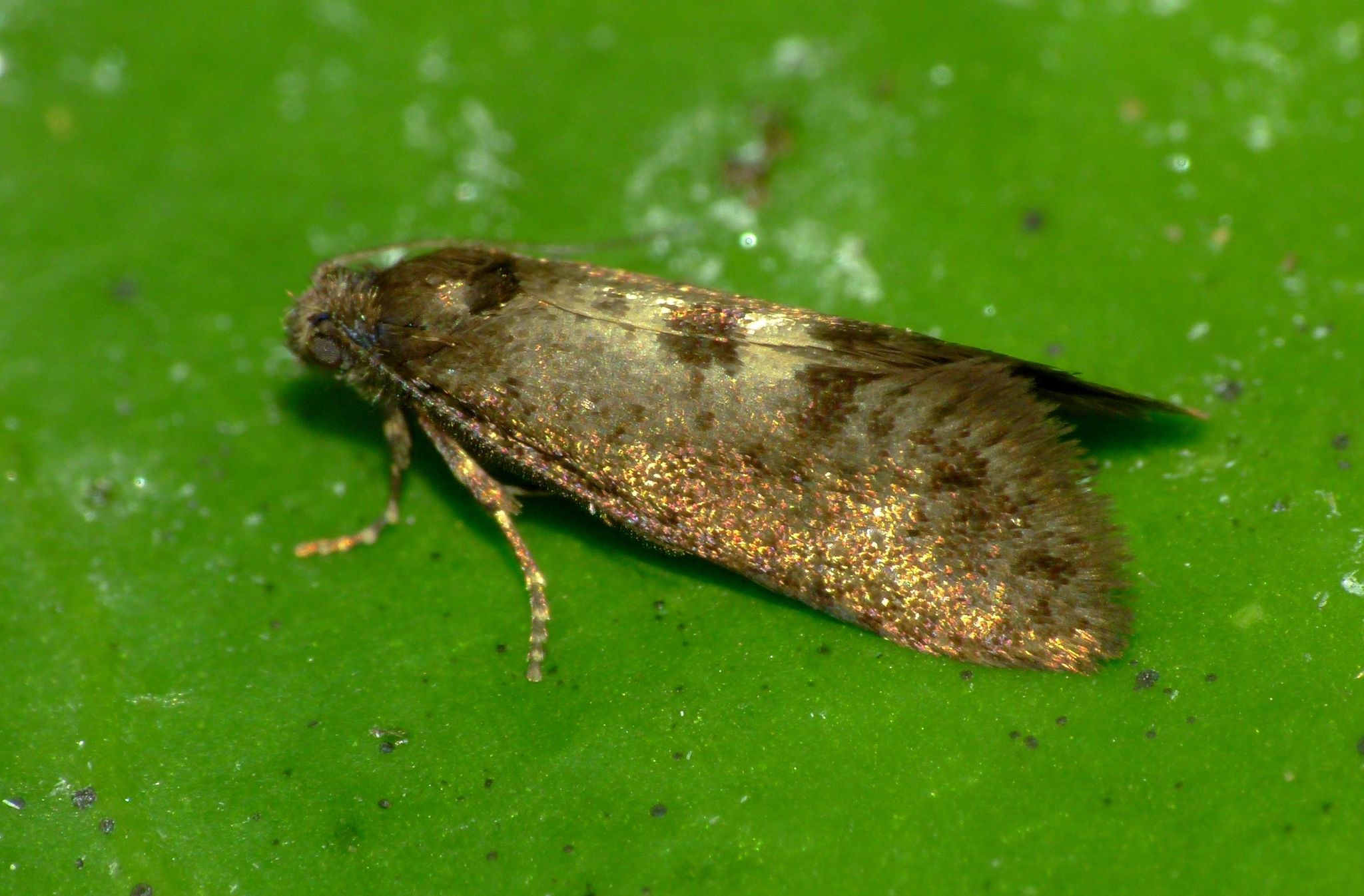

Scientific classification
- Domain: Eukaryota
- Kingdom: Animalia
- Phylum: Arthropoda
- Class: Insecta
- Order: Lepidoptera
- Family: Psychidae
- Genus: Mallobathra
- Species: M. perisseuta

Binomial name
- Mallobathra perisseuta Meyrick, 1920

= Mallobathra perisseuta =

Species of moth

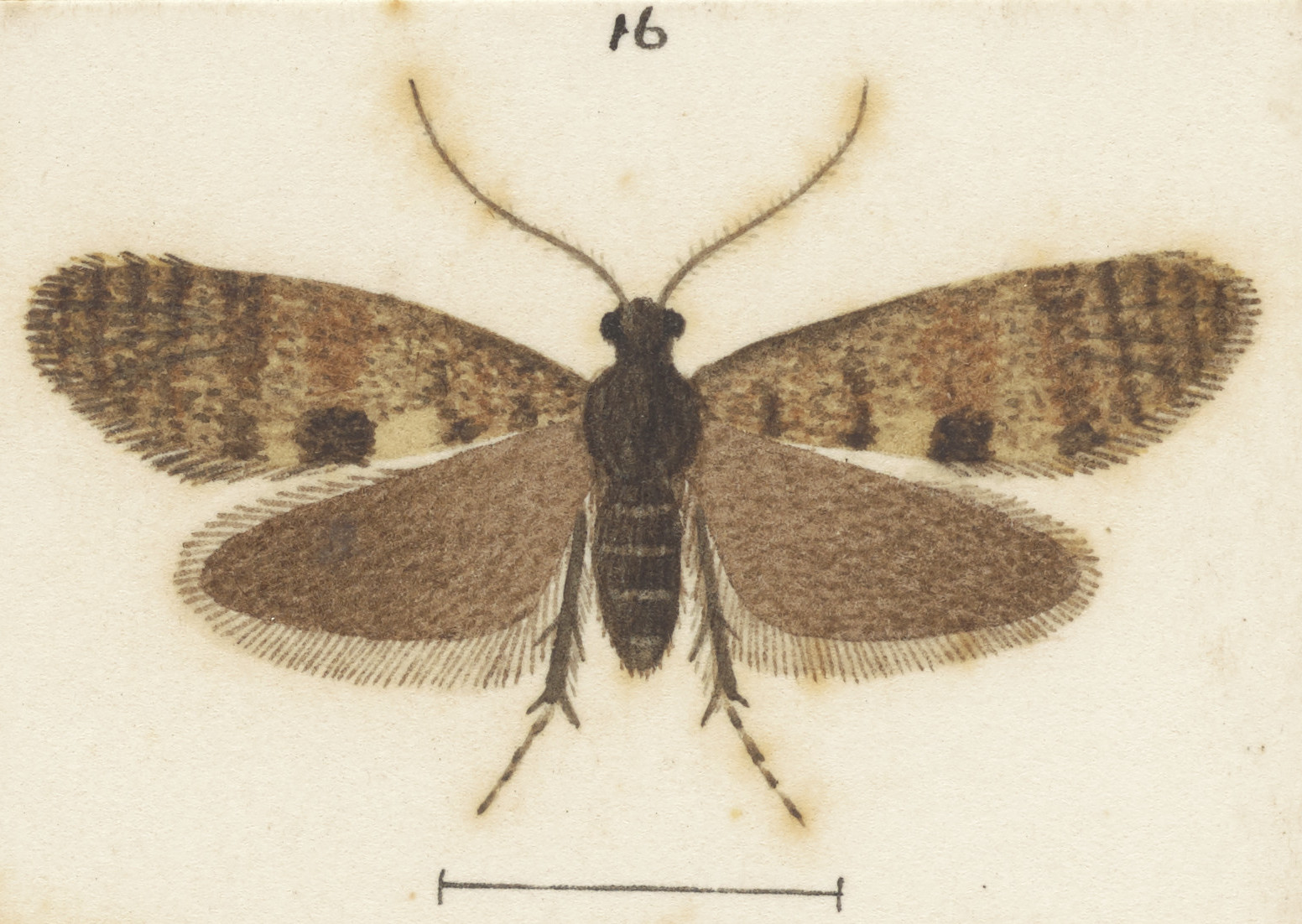
Illustration of M. perisseuta by George Hudson.

Mallobathra perisseuta is a moth of the family Psychidae. This species is endemic to New Zealand.
