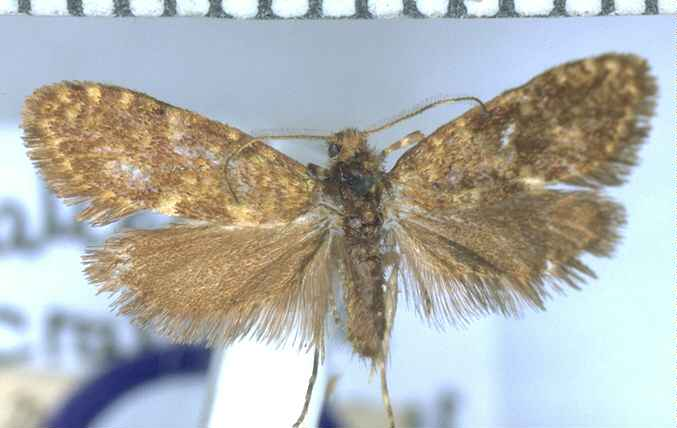
- Lectotype of M. crataea, type species of this genus

Scientific classification
- Kingdom: Animalia
- Phylum: Arthropoda
- Clade: Pancrustacea
- Class: Insecta
- Order: Lepidoptera
- Family: Psychidae
- Genus: Mallobathra; Meyrick, 1888

= Mallobathra =

Genus of moths

Mallobathra is a genus of moths belonging to the family Psychidae, and are bagworm moths. This genus was first described by Edward Meyrick. It is endemic to New Zealand. The type species of this genus is Mallobathra crataea.

== Description ==
Meyrick originally described this genus as follows:

Head with loosely-appressed hairs; no ocelli; no tongue. Antennae 3/4 in male with joints elongate, strongly biciliated with fascicles (2 1/2-4), basal joint stout, loosely scaled, with small pecten. Labial palpi moderate or short, drooping, second joint loosely rough-scaled, with two or three apical bristles, terminal joint tolerably pointed. Maxillary palpi obsolete. Posterior tibiae with tolerably-appressed scales. Forewings with vein 1 furcate, 2 from near angle, 6 sometimes absent (microphanes), 7 and 8 stalked, 7 to hindmargin, 11 from before middle, secondary cell tolerably defined. Hindwings somewhat narrower than forewings, elongate-ovate : cilia 2/3-1 1/2; veins 6 and 7 parallel, 6 sometimes absent (microphanes).

== Behaviour ==
Winged females of Mallobathra species are reluctant to fly with some being semi-apterous. They drop to the ground when disturbed. The males are active flyers.

== Habitat and hosts ==
Species in this genus can be found from sea level to the alpine zones, and have a wide tolerance of sites and climate. Some species in this genus are common in forest or scrub, with trunk-frequenting or litter-living larvae, while others are found on lichen covered cliffs. The larva of the only member of the genus known from the subantarctic, Mallobathra campbellica, is a litter-dwelling species.

== Species ==
Mallobathra contains the following species:
- Mallobathra abyssina (Clarke, 1934)
- Mallobathra angusta Philpott, 1928
- Mallobathra aphrosticha Meyrick, 1912
- Mallobathra campbellica Dugdale, 1971
- Mallobathra cana Philpott, 1927
- Mallobathra cataclysma Clarke, 1934
- Mallobathra crataea Meyrick, 1888
- Mallobathra fenwicki Philpott, 1924
- Mallobathra homalopa Meyrick, 1891
- Mallobathra lapidosa Meyrick, 1914
- Mallobathra memotuina Clarke, 1934
- Mallobathra metrosema Meyrick, 1888
- Mallobathra obscura Philpott, 1928
- Mallobathra perisseuta Meyrick, 1920
- Mallobathra petrodoxa (Meyrick, 1923)
- Mallobathra scoriota Meyrick, 1909
- Mallobathra strigulata Philpott, 1924
- Mallobathra subalpina Philpott, 1930
- Mallobathra tonnoiri Philpott, 1927
