= Mallobathra subalpina =

Scientific classification
- Domain: Eukaryota
- Kingdom: Animalia
- Phylum: Arthropoda
- Class: Insecta
- Order: Lepidoptera
- Family: Psychidae
- Genus: Mallobathra
- Species: M. subalpina

Binomial name
- Mallobathra subalpina Philpott, 1930

Species of moth

Mallobathra subalpina is a moth of the family Psychidae. This species is endemic to New Zealand.
