= Mallobathra strigulata =

- Male holotype

Scientific classification
- Kingdom: Animalia
- Phylum: Arthropoda
- Clade: Pancrustacea
- Class: Insecta
- Order: Lepidoptera
- Family: Psychidae
- Genus: Mallobathra
- Species: M. strigulata

Binomial name
- Mallobathra strigulata Philpott, 1924

Species of moth endemic to New Zealand

Mallobathra strigulata is a moth of the family Psychidae. It was first described by Alfred Philpott in 1924. This species is endemic to New Zealand and has been observed in the Nelson region and on Kapiti Island. This species frequents native forest in the montane habitat zone. The adult moth is very similar in appearance to Mallobathra crataea but can be distinguished as a result of M. strigulata's larger size, clearer markings and differences in the male genitalia. Adults are on the wing in November and December.

== Taxonomy ==
This species was first described by Alfred Philpott in 1924 using specimens collected in Nelson at around 2,500 feet (760 m). In 1927 Philpott discussed and illustrated the maxilla of this species. Also in 1927 Philpott discussed and illustrated the male genitalia of M. strigulata. George Hudson treated this species as a synonym of Mallobathra crataea in his 1928 book The butterflies and moths of New Zealand. Philpott subsequently argued that there was sufficient differences in the genitalia of the two species to justify M. strigulata being regarded as distinct. As a result in his 1939 book A supplement to the butterflies and moths of New Zealand Hudson treated this moth as a distinct species. John S. Dugdale in 1971 confirmed both that M. strigulata was a distinct species and its placement in the genus Mallobathra. The male holotype, collected by Philpott on Dun Mountain, is held at the New Zealand Arthropod Collection.

== Description ==
Philpott described this species as follows:

♂. 15-17 mm. Head dark brown, sometimes ochreous-tinged. Antennae ochreous, blotched with fuscous, ciliations in ♂ 2 1/2. Thorax dark bronzy-brown. Abdomen dark brown. Legs brown, anterior tarsi annulated with ochreous. Forewings, costa evenly arched, apex rounded, termen obliquely rounded, dark bronzy-brown with numerous transverse waved ochreous bands, inseparable on apical half of wing; near base, especially on dorsal part of wing, some violet metallic scales; on dorsum at middle the bronzy-brown colouring forms a dark semicircular spot marginated before and behind by a clearer area of ochreous: cilia bronzy-brown mixed with ochreous. Hindwings and cilia dark fuscous.

Philpott pointed out that this species is very similar in appearance to M. crataea but that it is almost twice as large and has markings that are much clearer.

== Distribution ==
This species is endemic to New Zealand and has been observed in the Nelson region and at Kapiti Island.

== Habitat ==
This species frequents native forest in the montane habitat zone.

== Behaviour ==
Adults are on the wing in November and December.
