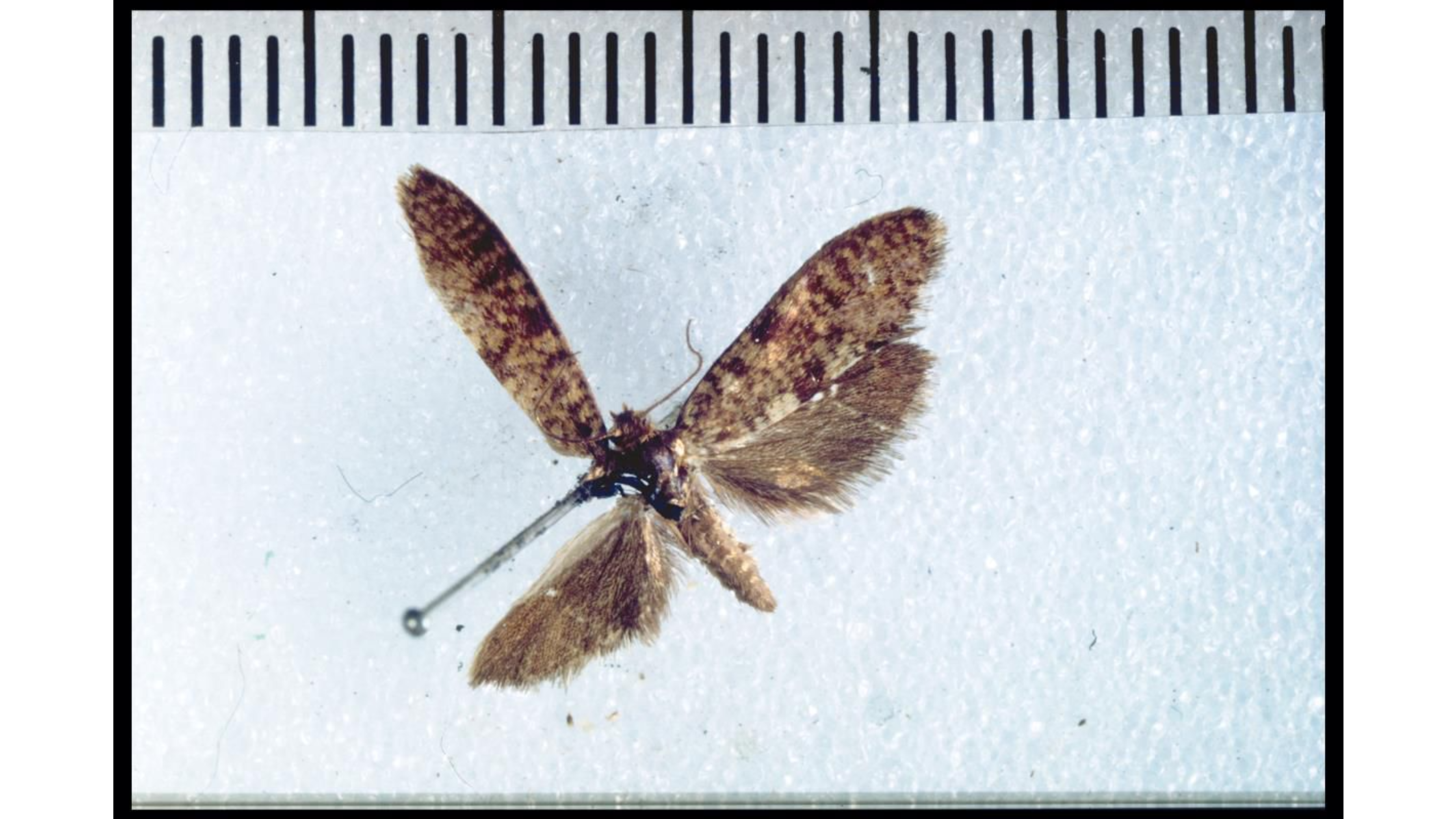
- Holotype

Scientific classification
- Kingdom: Animalia
- Phylum: Arthropoda
- Class: Insecta
- Order: Lepidoptera
- Family: Psychidae
- Genus: Mallobathra
- Species: M. angusta

Binomial name
- Mallobathra angusta Philpott, 1928

= Mallobathra angusta =

Species of moth, endemic to New Zealand

Mallobathra angusta is a moth of the family Psychidae. It was first described by Alfred Philpott in 1928. This species is endemic to New Zealand and has been collected at Mount Arthur. Adults are on the wing in November.

== Taxonomy ==
This species was described by Alfred Philpott in 1928 using a male specimen collected at the Mount Arthur tableland track at 3000 ft. George Hudson discussed and illustrated this species in his 1939 book A supplement to the butterflies and moths of New Zealand. The holotype is held at the New Zealand Arthropod Collection.

== Description ==
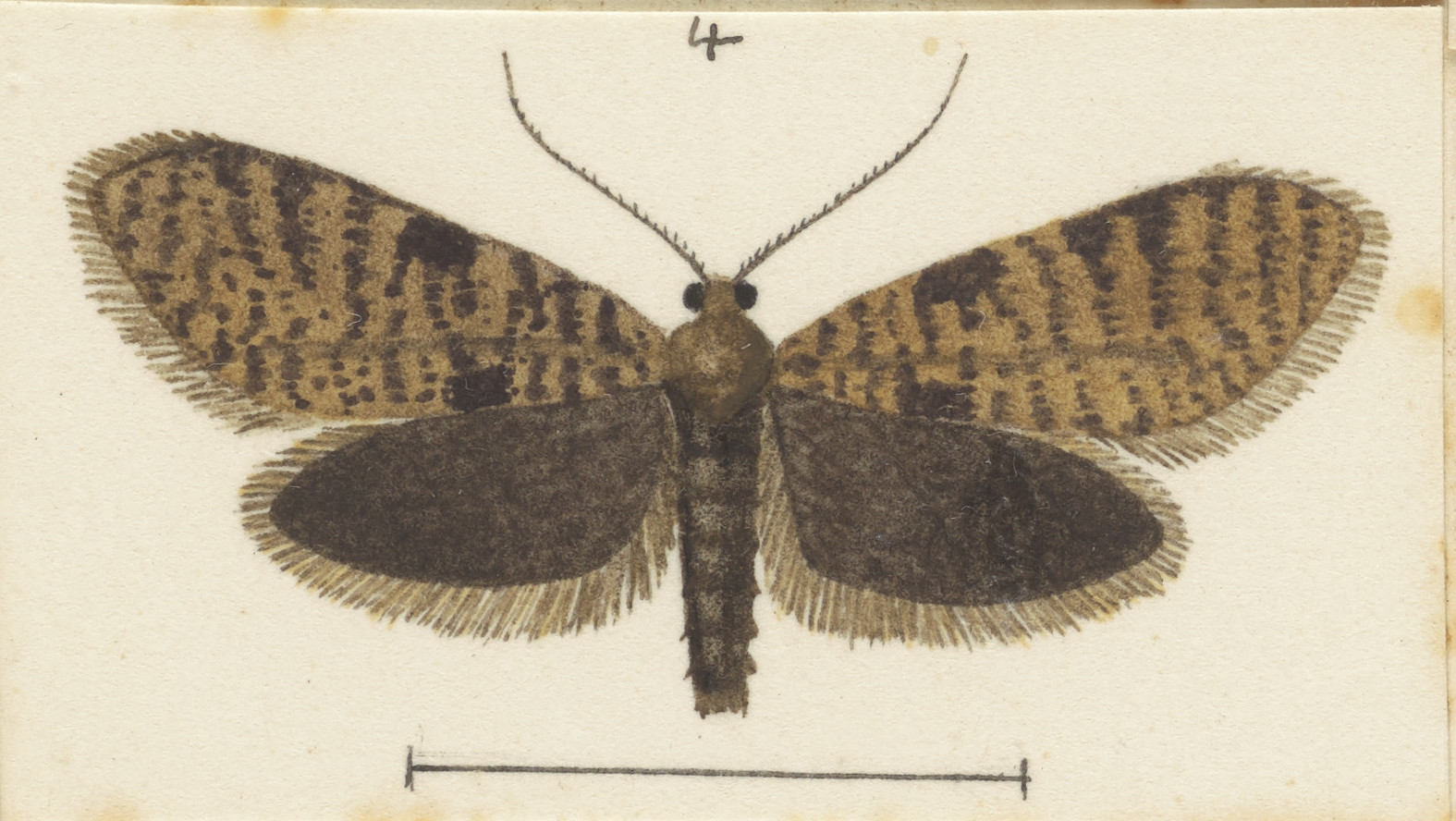
Illustration of M. angusta by George Hudson

Philpott described the adult of this species as follows:

♂. 20 mm. Head and palpi tawny. Antennae brown mixed with ochreous, ciliations in ♂ 2. Thorax and abdomen purplish-brown. Legs purplish-brown mixed with ochreous, tibiae and tarsi annulated with ochreous. Forewings elongate, narrow, costa moderately arched, apex rounded, termen strongly oblique; ochreous; strigulated throughout with dark purplish-fuscous; a blotch of purplish-fuscous on costa at middle and a similar one on dorsum beneath; fringes fuscous-grey. Hindwings dark fuscous; fringes fuscous-grey, paler apically.

== Distribution ==
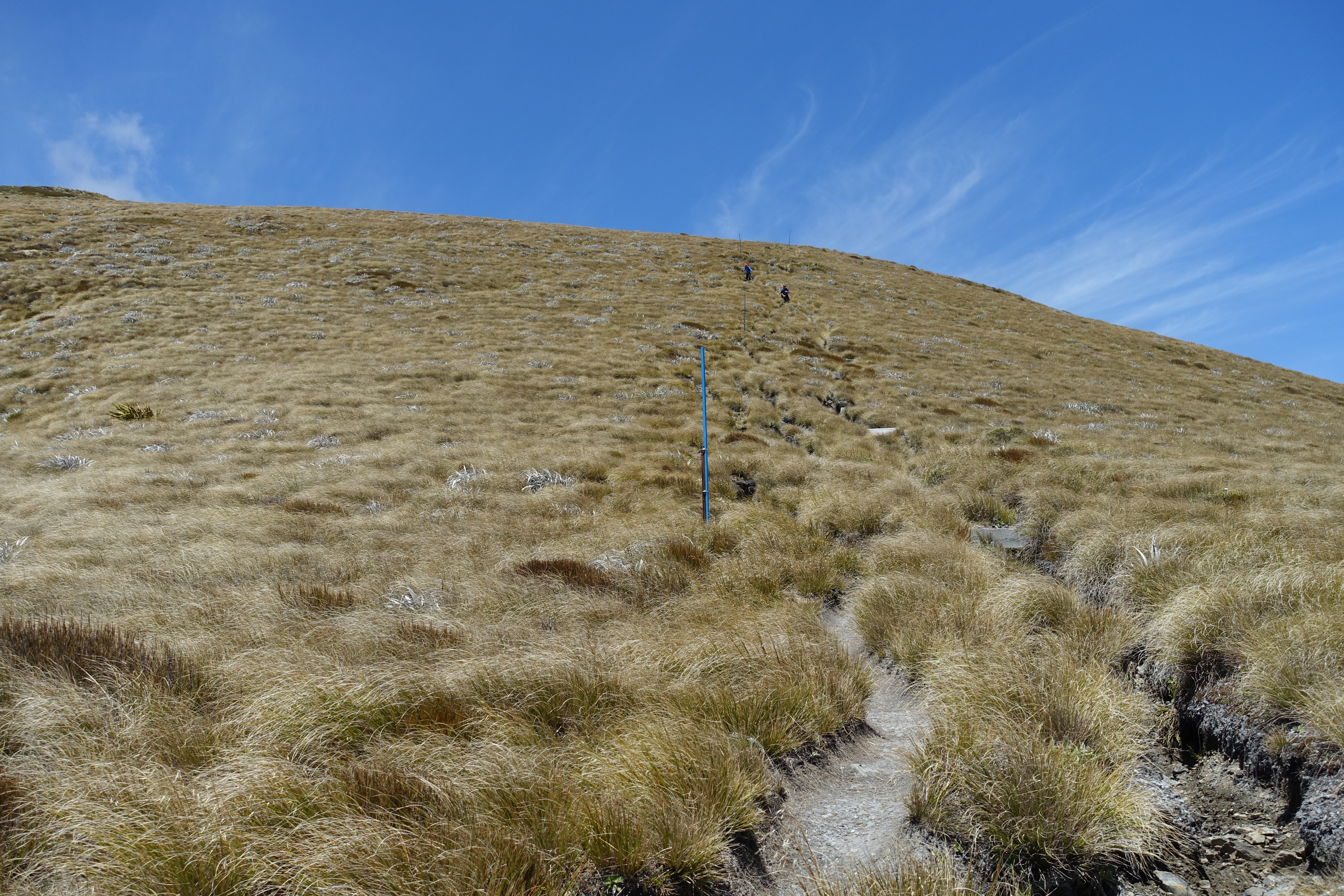
Mount Arthur, type locality of M. angusta.

This species is endemic to New Zealand and has been collected at Mount Arthur.

== Behaviour ==
Adults of this species are on the wing in November.
