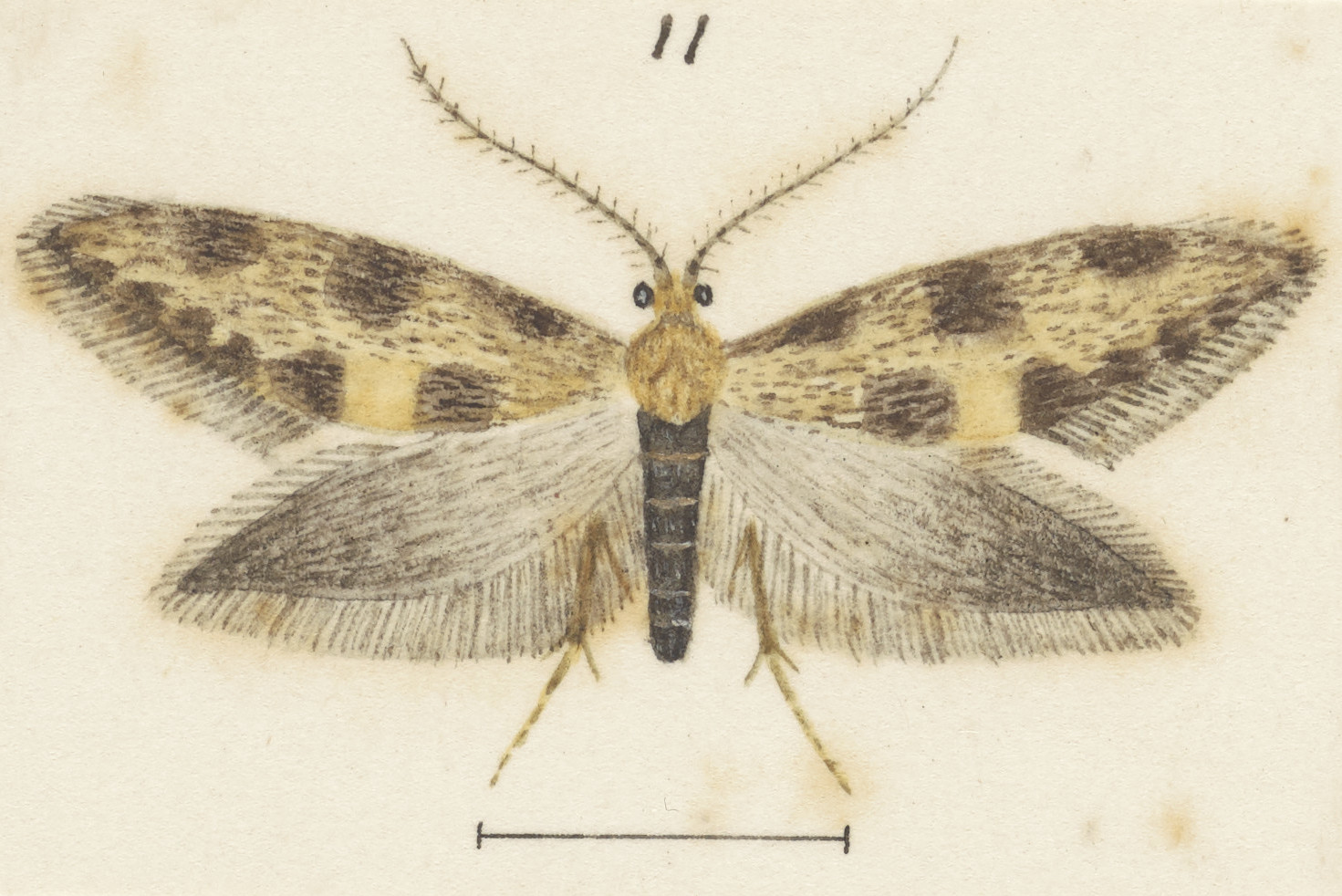
- Illustration of male

Scientific classification
- Domain: Eukaryota
- Kingdom: Animalia
- Phylum: Arthropoda
- Class: Insecta
- Order: Lepidoptera
- Family: Psychidae
- Genus: Mallobathra
- Species: M. scoriota

Binomial name
- Mallobathra scoriota Meyrick, 1909

= Mallobathra scoriota =

Species of moth

Mallobathra scoriota is a moth of the family Psychidae. This species is endemic to New Zealand.
