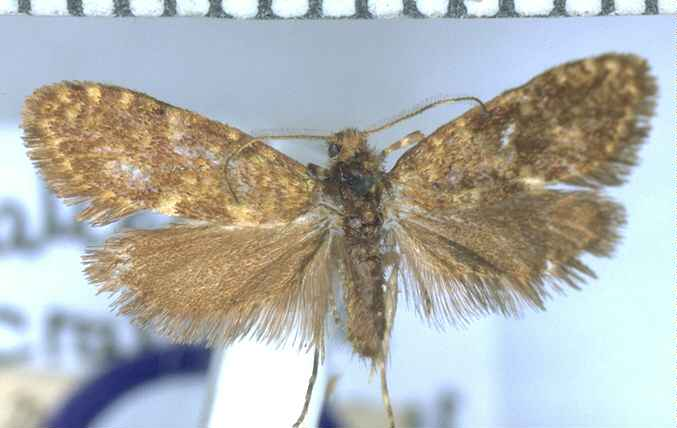
- Lectotype specimen

Scientific classification
- Kingdom: Animalia
- Phylum: Arthropoda
- Clade: Pancrustacea
- Class: Insecta
- Order: Lepidoptera
- Family: Psychidae
- Genus: Mallobathra
- Species: M. crataea

Binomial name
- Mallobathra crataea Meyrick, 1888

= Mallobathra crataea =

Species of moth endemic to New Zealand

Mallobathra crataea is a moth of the family Psychidae. This species was first described by Edward Meyrick in 1888. This species is endemic to New Zealand and is found in both the North and South Islands. This species inhabits native bush and forest. Adults are on the wing from September until October and again in January. They are regarded as appearing early in the New Zealand spring. M. crataea is day flying with the males being rapid flyers in hot sunshine. The females are reluctant fliers but instead are seen amongst bushes, particularly where the male of the species are most numerous. The female will fall to the ground if disturbed.

== Taxonomy ==
This species was first described by Edward Meyrick in 1888 using specimens collected at Mount Arthur at a height of 4,000 feet (1,200 m) in January. It is the type species of Mallobathra by subsequent designation. In 1927 Alfred Philpott discussed and illustrated the male genitalia of this species. George Hudson discussed and illustrated this species in his 1928 book The butterflies and moths of New Zealand. In 1971 John S. Dugdale reviewed the genus Mallobathra and confirmed the placement of this species within it. The male lectotype is held at the Natural History Museum, London.

== Description ==
Illustration by Hudson.

Meyrick described this species as follows:

Male. — 13-14 mm. Head, palpi, antennae, thorax, and abdomen dark fuscous ; palpi short; antennal ciliations 3. Legs dark fuscous, ringed with whitish-ochreous. Forewings elongate, moderate, costa gently arched, apex rounded, hindmargin rounded, rather strongly oblique ; dark fuscous, obscurely irrorated with small greyish-ochreous spots ; several on posterior half of costa more distinct ; a small whitish-ochreous subquadrate spot on inner margin at 1/3, and another at 2/3 : cilia dark fuscous. Hindwings and cilia dark fuscous ; cilia 2/3.

Hudson stated that this species is variable in size and the depth and colour of its markings. The female of this species has a large anal tuft of hair like scales. This is used to cover eggs when first deposited.

Hudson described the egg of this species as about one-fortieth of an inch in length, elongate-oval, white, without any trace of sculpture.

== Distribution ==
M. crataea is endemic to New Zealand and has been observed in the North and South Islands. This species is said to have occurred in Waimarino, Wellington, Nelson, Otago and Invercargill.

== Habitat ==
This species inhabits native scrub and forest.

== Behaviour ==
Adults are on the wing from September until October and in January. This species is regarded as one of the first moths able to be collected in early spring. This species is day flying with the male being a very rapid flyer, particularly in hot sunshine. The females are reluctant fliers but have been seen and collected amongst bushes, particularly where the male of the species are most numerous. The females fall to the ground when disturbed.
