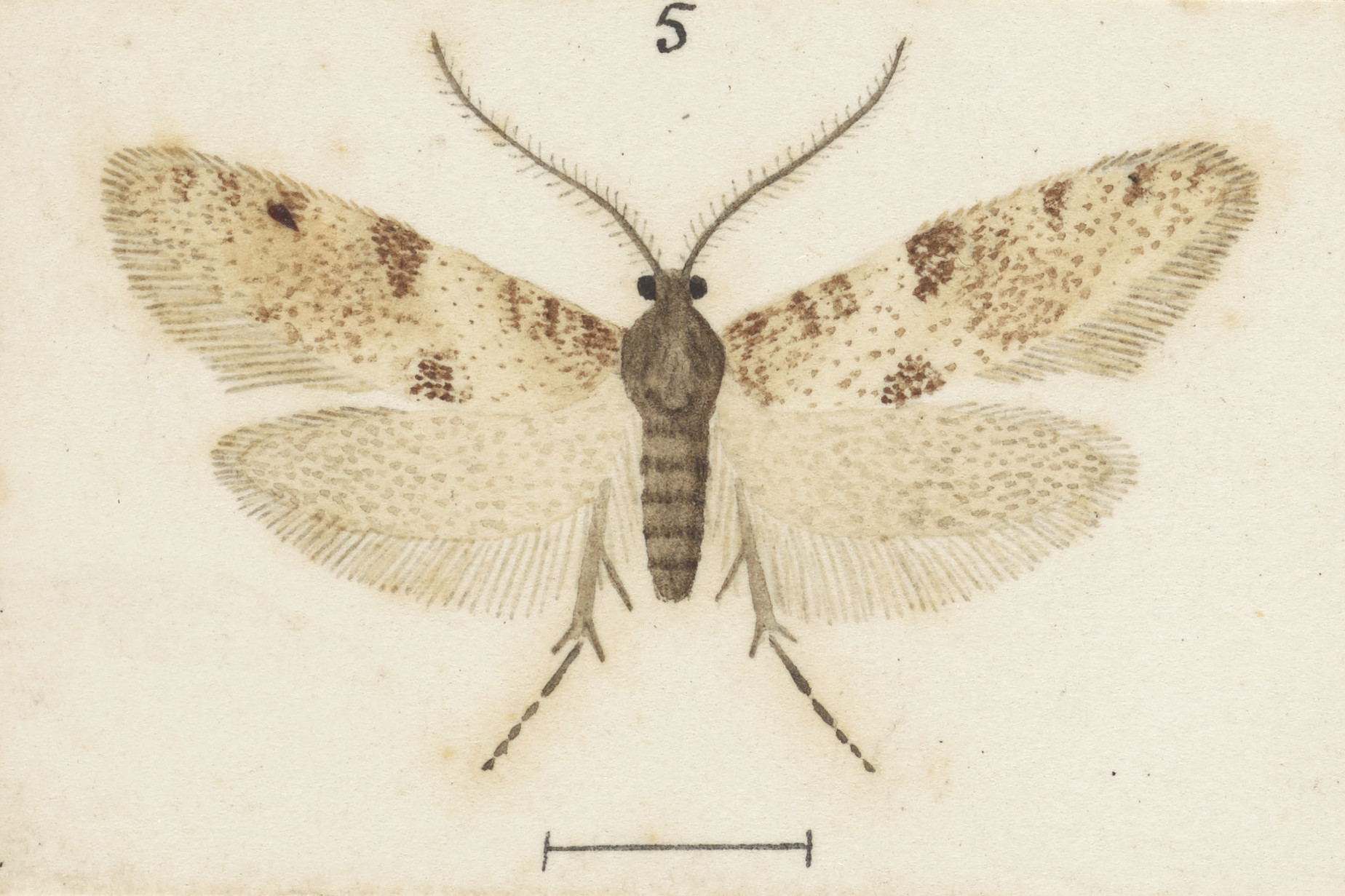

Scientific classification
- Kingdom: Animalia
- Phylum: Arthropoda
- Class: Insecta
- Order: Lepidoptera
- Family: Psychidae
- Genus: Mallobathra
- Species: M. metrosema

Binomial name
- Mallobathra metrosema Meyrick, 1888

Synonyms
- Reductoderce metrosema (Meyrick, 1888)

= Mallobathra metrosema =

Species of moth

Mallobathra metrosema is a moth of the family Psychidae. This species was first described by Edward Meyrick in 1888. It is endemic to New Zealand and has been observed in the North and South Islands. This species is known to inhabit remnant floodplain native forest. Adults have been seen on the wing in September and January. This species is regarded as being uncommon in the Low Canterbury Plains Ecological District.

== Taxonomy ==
This species was first described by Edward Meyrick in 1888 using specimens collected in Riccarton Bush in Christchurch in September. George Hudson discussed and illustrated this species in his 1928 book The butterflies and moths of New Zealand. In 1971 K. A. J. Wise, when revising the genus Reductoderces, placed this species within that genus. However John S. Dugdale did not follow this placement in his 1988 publication cataloguing New Zealand lepidoptera. The lectotype specimen is held at the Natural History Museum, London.

== Description ==
Meyrick first described this species as follows:

Male. — 12-13 mm. Head, palpi, antennae, and thorax pale greyish-ochreous; palpi short; antennal ciliations 4. Abdomen grey. Legs dark fuscous, ringed with whitish-ochreous, posterior tibiae suffused with whitish-ochreous. Forewings elongate, slightly dilated posteriorly, costa gently arched, apex round-pointed, hindmargin very oblique, slightly rounded; pale greyish-ochreous, sometimes brownish-tinged; numerous small scattered irregular dark fuscous singulae; a very obscure ochreous-whitish streak along inner margin from 1/3 to near anal angle, interrupted by a small dark fuscous spot in middle; a straight narrow dark fuscous fascia from middle of costa to inner margin before anal angle, more or less distinctly interrupted in disc; three very small dark fuscous spots on posterior half of costa : cilia pale greyish-ochreous, fuscous - tinged. Hindwings fuscous - grey; cilia 4/5, light fuscous-grey.

== Distribution ==
This species is endemic to New Zealand and has been observed in the North and South Islands. Hudson stated that as well as Christchurch this species had also been observed on the coast near Wellington and at Hanmer. This species has also been observed near Whangārei. This species is regarded as being uncommon in the Low Canterbury Plains Ecological District.

== Habitat ==
This species is known to inhabit remnant floodplain native forest.

== Behaviour ==
The adults of this species are on the wing in September and January.
