= Mallobathra obscura =

Scientific classification
- Kingdom: Animalia
- Phylum: Arthropoda
- Clade: Pancrustacea
- Class: Insecta
- Order: Lepidoptera
- Family: Psychidae
- Genus: Mallobathra
- Species: M. obscura

Binomial name
- Mallobathra obscura Philpott, 1928

Species of moth

Mallobathra obscura is a moth of the family Psychidae. It was first described by Alfred Philpott in 1928. This species is endemic to New Zealand.
