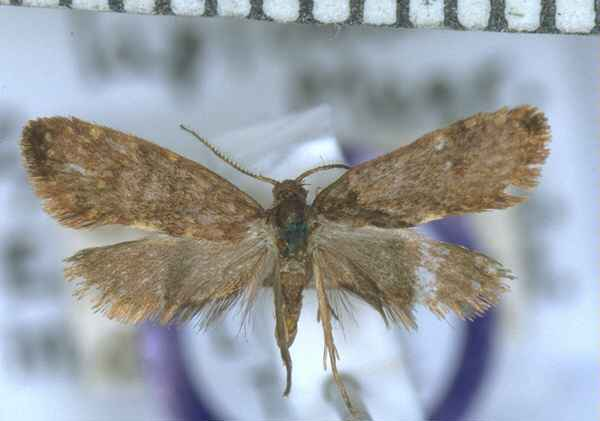

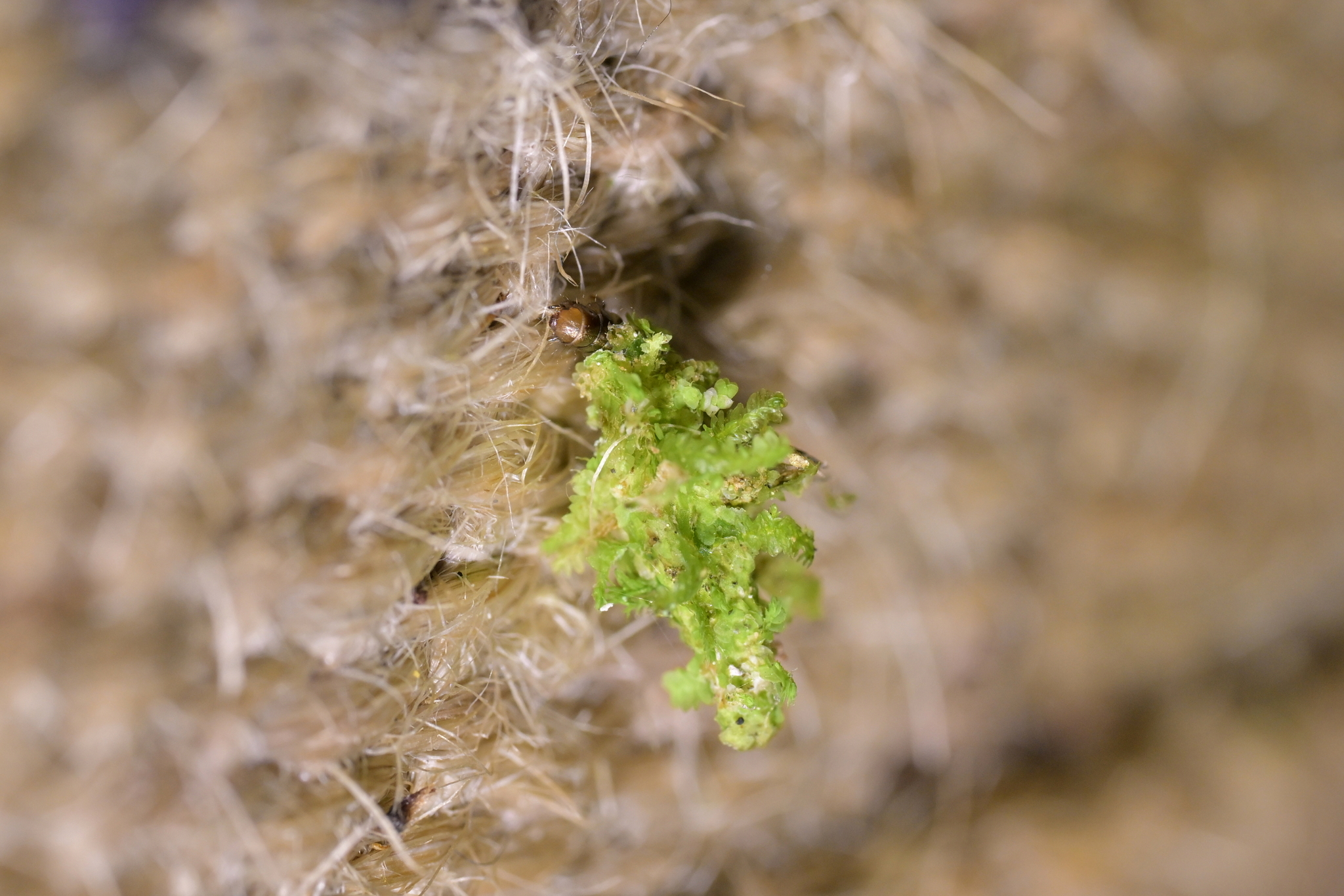
- Adult (top) and larva in case (bottom)

Scientific classification
- Domain: Eukaryota
- Kingdom: Animalia
- Phylum: Arthropoda
- Class: Insecta
- Order: Lepidoptera
- Family: Psychidae
- Genus: Mallobathra
- Species: M. lapidosa

Binomial name
- Mallobathra lapidosa Meyrick, 1914

= Mallobathra lapidosa =

Species of moth

Mallobathra lapidosa is a species of moth in the family Psychidae. This species is endemic to New Zealand.
