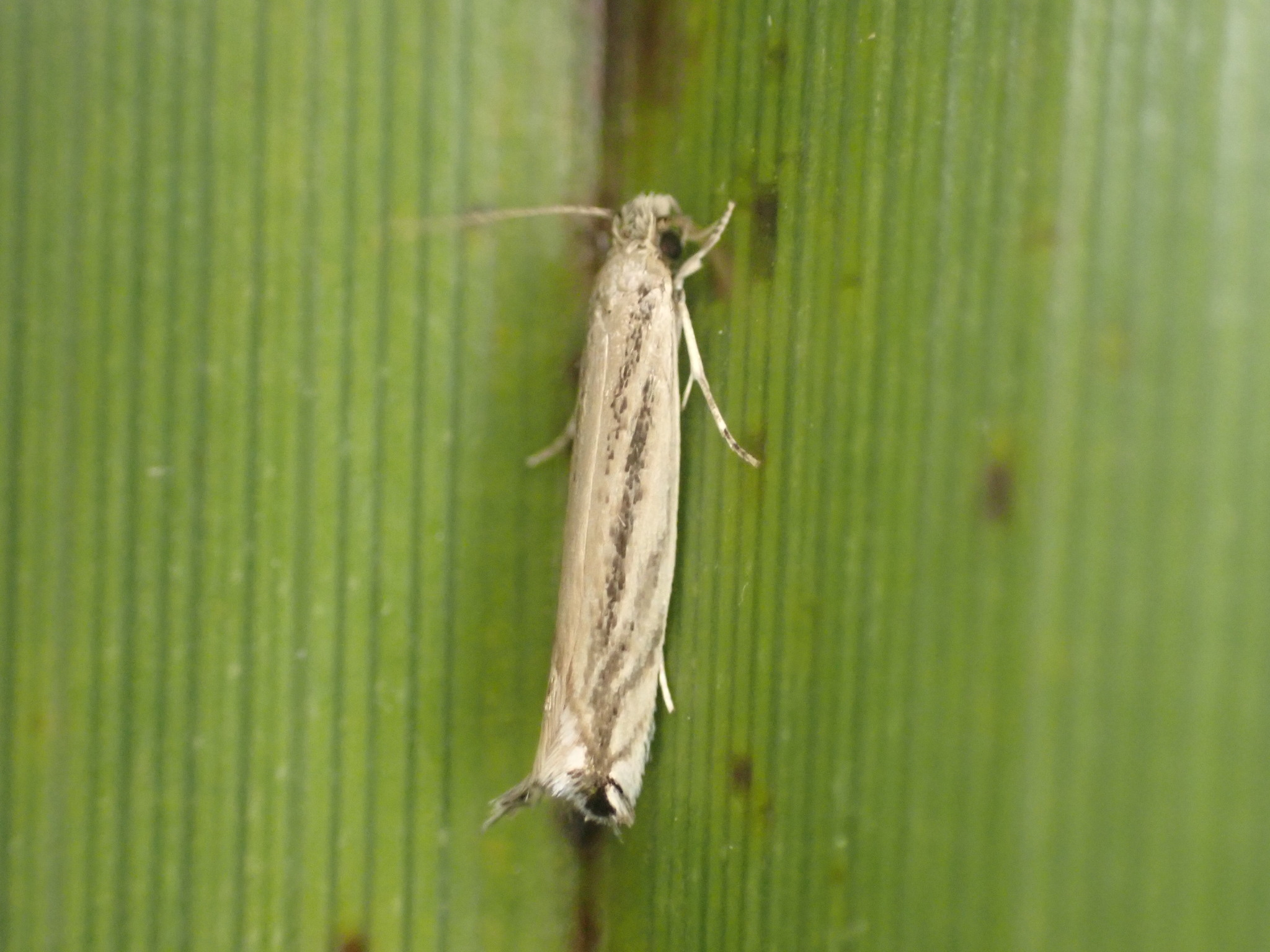

Scientific classification
- Kingdom: Animalia
- Phylum: Arthropoda
- Clade: Pancrustacea
- Class: Insecta
- Order: Lepidoptera
- Family: Tineidae
- Genus: Erechthias
- Species: E. exospila

Binomial name
- Erechthias exospila (Meyrick, 1901)

Synonyms
- Ereunetis exospila Meyrick, 1901

= Erechthias exospila =

Species of moth endemic to New Zealand

Erechthias exospila is a species of moth of the family Tineidae. It was first described by Edward Meyrick in 1901. It is endemic to New Zealand and can be found in the North Island as well as the Poor Knights and D'Urville Islands. This species inhabits native forest. Larvae of species in the genus Erechthias feed on dead plant debris or the tough leaves of plants such as palms. E. exospila frequents the dead leaves of Astelia. Adults have been observed in November and February. Specimens of this species have been collected via malaise trap and beating shrubs.

== Taxonomy ==
This was first described by Edward Meyrick in 1901 using one specimen he collected at Whangārei Heads in December and originally named Ereunetis exospila. In 1914 Meyrick assigned this species to the genus Erechthias. Hudson discussed and illustrated this species in his 1928 book The butterflies and moths of New Zealand. In 1988 John S. Dugdale confirmed the placement of this species in the genus Erechthias. The male holotype specimen is held at the Natural History Museum, London.

== Description ==
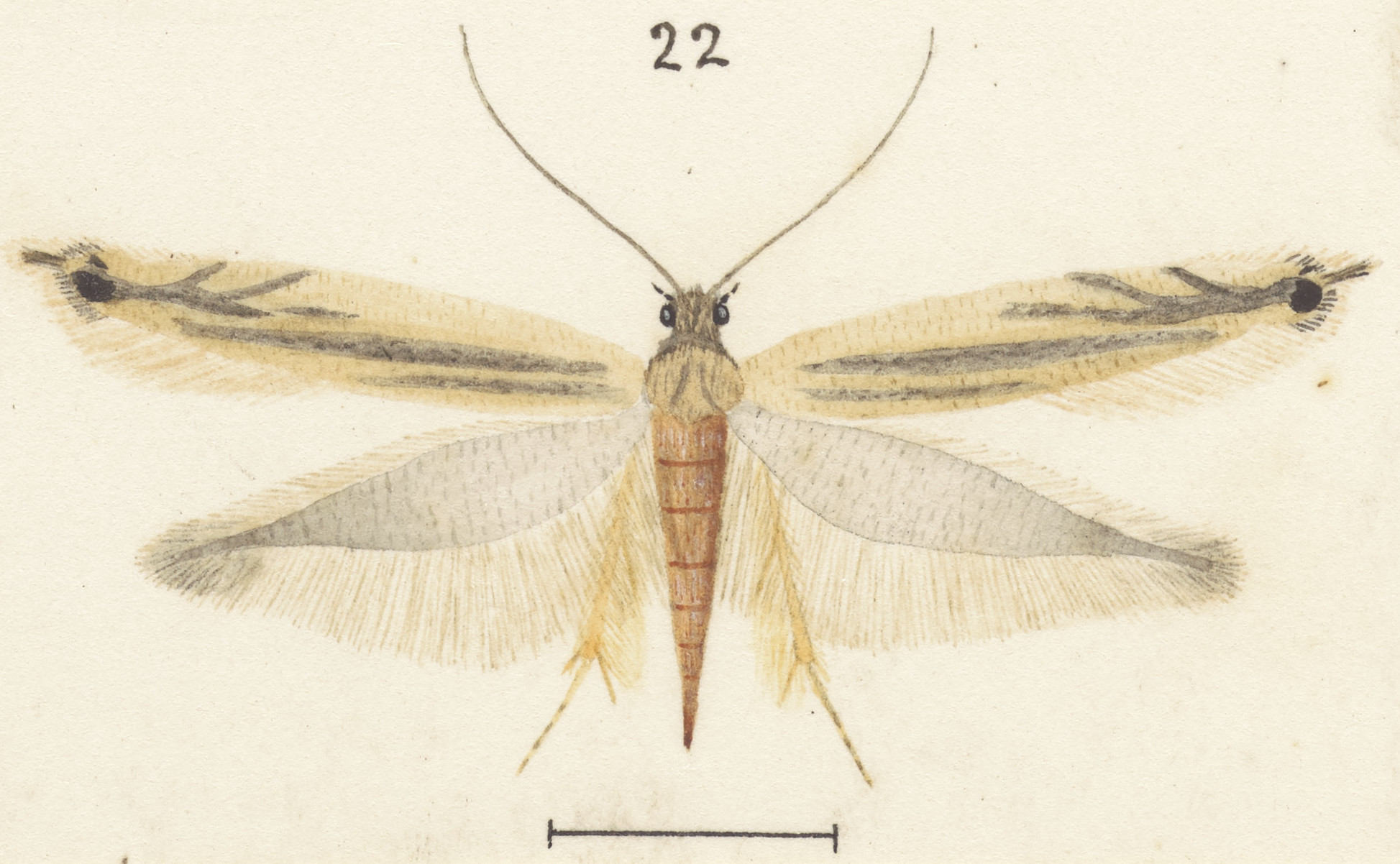
Illustration by Hudson.

Meyrick described this species as follows:

♂. 12 mm. Head whitish-ochreous, between antennas infuscated. Palpi whitish-ochreous, externally partially infuscated. Antennae whitish-ochreous, ringed with fuscous. Thorax ochreous. Abdomen pale whitish-ochreous. Forewings elongate-lanceolate; brownish-ochreous; a white costal streak from base, separating at 2/3 into two branches which run to termen in middle and below apex, and partially confluent towards base with a straight white streak from base of costa to termen above tornus; a round black apical spot, partly in cilia, preceded by a fine black bar in costal cilia and surmounted by two diverging fuscous bars, cilia otherwise ochreous-whitish, with two fuscous bars below apex. Hindwings and cilia pale whitish-ochreous.

The coloration of this moth resembles that of other species associated with dead leaves of Astelia (for example Amphixystis hapsimacha and Prothinodes grammocosma), and is highly protective.

== Distribution ==
It is endemic to New Zealand. This species has been observed in the North Island and at the Poor Knights Islands as well as Rangitoto ki te Tonga / D'Urville Island.

== Habitat and hosts ==
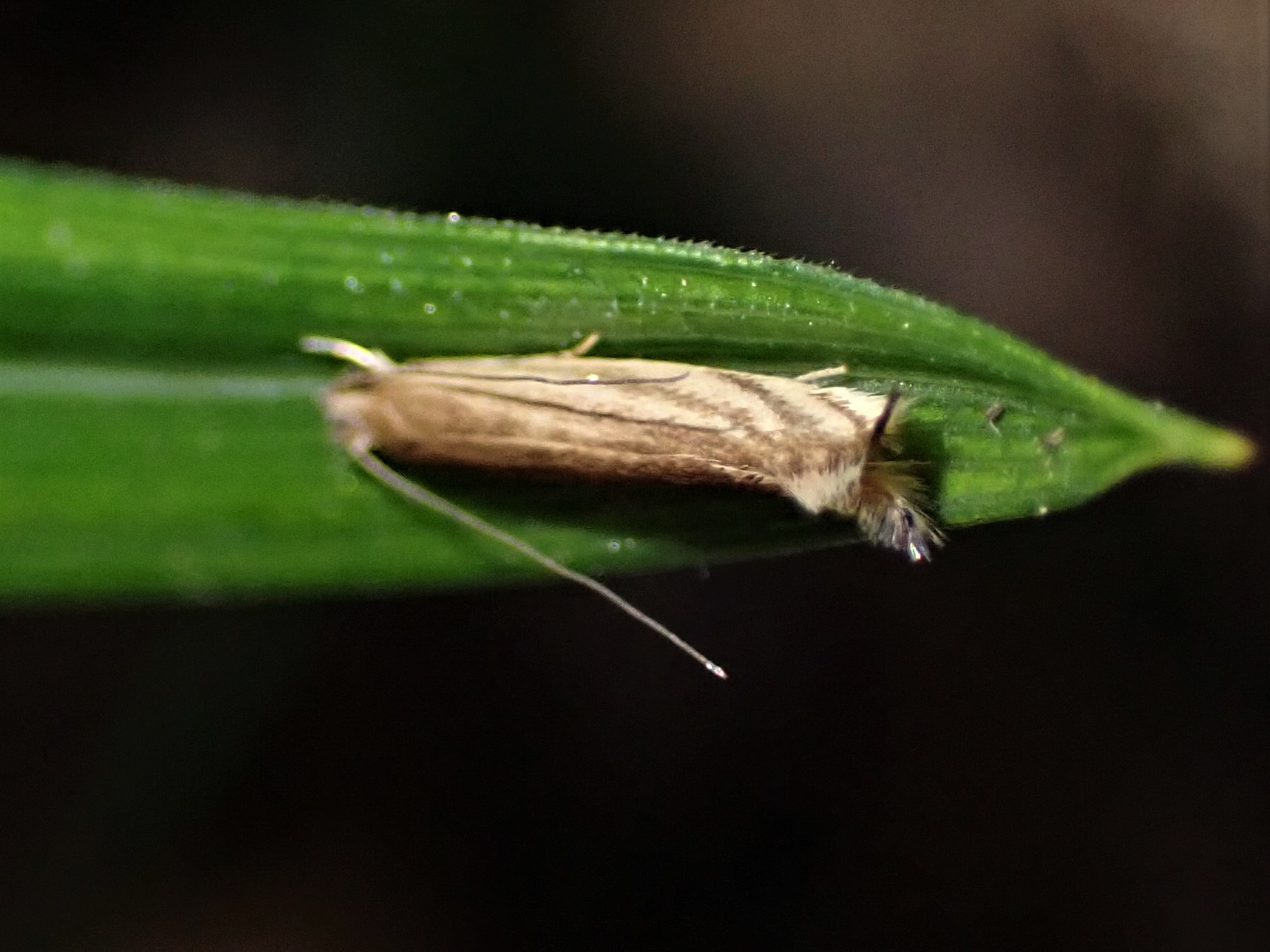
Live specimen of E. exospila.

This species inhabits native forest. Larvae of species in the genus Erechthias feed on dead plant debris or the tough leaves of plants such as palms. E. exospila frequents the dead leaves of Astelia.

== Behaviour ==
Adults of this species has been observed in November to February. Adults have been collected via malaise trap and beating shrubs.
