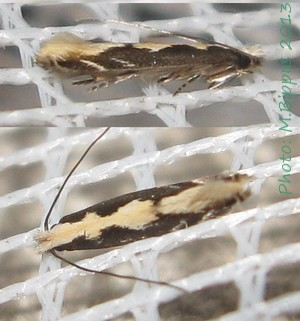
- Amphixystis species

Scientific classification
- Kingdom: Animalia
- Phylum: Arthropoda
- Clade: Pancrustacea
- Class: Insecta
- Order: Lepidoptera
- Family: Tineidae
- Subfamily: Hieroxestinae
- Genus: Amphixystis; Meyrick, 1901

Type species
- Amphixystis hapsimacha Meyrick, 1901

Synonyms
- Coeliometopa Turner, 1923; Machimostola Meyrick, 1928; Orthochthella T. B. Fletcher, 1940; Problastodes Meyrick, 1928; Sporadarthra Meyrick, 1911; Syncrobyla Meyrick, 1915; Ulocorys Meyrick, 1915

= Amphixystis =

Genus of moths

Amphixystis is a genus of moths belonging to the family Tineidae. The family was first described by Edward Meyrick in 1901.

Hostplant records are only known for 2 species of this genus: Amphixystis anchiala had been recorded feeding on Euphorbia resinifera, Citrullus colocynthis (Cucurbitaceae), Dioscorea alata and Dioscorea rotundata (Dioscoreaceae) and Amphixystis syntricha (Meyrick, 1910) that feeds on Pandanus montanus (Pandanaceae).

== Species ==
Some species of this genus are:

- Amphixystis aethalopis (Meyrick, 1930) (from Mauritius)
- Amphixystis anachoreta (Meyrick, 1921) (from Zimbabwe)
- Amphixystis anchiala (Meyrick, 1909) (from South Africa and Madagascar)
- Amphixystis antiloga (Meyrick, 1915) (from Australia)
- Amphixystis antongilella (Viette, 1955) (from Madagascar)
- Amphixystis aromaticella (Viette, 1957) (from Réunion and Madagascar)
- Amphixystis artiphanes (Meyrick, 1915) (Sri Lanka)
- Amphixystis beverrasella (Legrand, 1966) (from the Seychelles)
- Amphixystis canthopa (Meyrick, 1924) (from Mauritius)
- Amphixystis chrysodora (Meyrick, 1924) (from Mauritius)
- Amphixystis cincinnata (Meyrick, 1915) (Sri Lanka)
- Amphixystis colubrina (Meyrick, 1914) (from Malawi)
- Amphixystis commatias (Meyrick, 1915) (Sri Lanka)
- Amphixystis copidora (Meyrick, 1915) (Sri Lanka)
- Amphixystis crobylora (Meyrick, 1911) (from the Seychelles)
- Amphixystis crocinacma (Meyrick, 1930) (from Mauritius)
- Amphixystis crypsirias (Meyrick, 1930) (from Mauritius)
- Amphixystis cymataula (Meyrick, 1926) (from Zimbabwe)
- Amphixystis cyanodesma (Meyrick, 1911) (from the Seychelles)
- Amphixystis ensifera (Meyrick, 1911) (from the Seychelles)
- Amphixystis epirota (Meyrick, 1914) (from Malawi)
- Amphixystis fragosa (Meyrick, 1910) (from Mauritius & Réunion)
- Amphixystis fricata (Meyrick, 1911) (from the Seychelles & Madagascar)
- Amphixystis glomerata (Meyrick, 1911) (from the Seychelles)
- Amphixystis guttata Bippus, 2020 (from Réunion)
- Amphixystis gyracma (Meyrick, 1915) (India)
- Amphixystis hapsimacha Meyrick, 1901 (from New Zealand)
- Amphixystis herbulotella (Viette, 1955) (from Madagascar)
- Amphixystis hermatias (Meyrick, 1911) (from the Seychelles)
- Amphixystis heteroclina (Meyrick, 1915) (Sri Lanka)
- Amphixystis hydrochalca (Meyrick, 1930) (from Mauritius)
- Amphixystis hypolampes (Turner, 1923) (from Australia)
- Amphixystis ichnora (Meyrick, 1911) (from the Seychelles)
- Amphixystis irenica (Meyrick, 1911) (from the Seychelles)
- Amphiyxstis islamella (Turati, 1927) (Libya, Oman, Yemen)
- Amphixystis lactiflua (Meyrick, 1911) (from the Seychelles)
- Amphixystis ligyropa (Meyrick, 1915) (Sri Lanka)
- Amphixystis maillardella (Viette, 1957) (from Réunion)
- Amphixystis maroccana Gaedike, 2009 (from Maroccos)
- Amphixystis multipunctella (Legrand, 1966) (from the Seychelles)
- Amphixystis minuta Gaedicke, 2014 (from Yemen)
- Amphixystis nephalia (Meyrick, 1911) (from the Seychelles)
- Amphixystis oxymoris (Meyrick, 1916) (India)
- Amphixystis paroditella (Viette, 1957) (from Réunion)
- Amphixystis patelia Bippus, 2020 (from Réunion)
- Amphixystis polystrigella (Legrand, 1966) (from the Seychelles)
- Amphixystis protelesta (Meyrick, 1915) (India)
- Amphixystis rhodothicta (Meyrick, 1911) (from the Seychelles)
- Amphixystis rhothiaula (Meyrick, 1911) (from the Seychelles)
- Amphixystis rorida (Meyrick, 1911) (from the Seychelles)
- Amphixystis rotata (Meyrick, 1915) (India)
- Amphixystis roseostrigella (Legrand, 1966) (from the Seychelles)
- Amphixystis sciadocoma (Meyrick, 1924) (from Mauritius)
- Amphixystis selacta (Meyrick, 1911) (from the Seychelles)
- Amphixystis serrata (Meyrick, 1914) (from Mauritius, Reunion & Malawi)
- Amphixystis sicaria (Meyrick, 1911) (from the Seychelles)
- Amphixystis siccata (Meyrick, 1910) (from Mauritius)
- Amphixystis spathistis (Meyrick, 1930) (from Mauritius)
- Amphixystis syntricha (Meyrick, 1910) (from Réunion, Mauritius & South Africa)
- Amphixystis tachygrapha (Meyrick, 1915) (Sri Lanka)
- Amphixystis tarsota (Meyrick, 1911) (from the Seychelles)
- Amphiyxstis taurus Gaedicke, 2014 (from Yemen)
- Amphixystis thapsonota (Meyrick, 1915) (India)
- Amphixystis trixysta (Meyrick, 1910) (from Mauritius)
