= Amphixystis anchiala =

Scientific classification
- Kingdom: Animalia
- Phylum: Arthropoda
- Clade: Pancrustacea
- Class: Insecta
- Order: Lepidoptera
- Family: Tineidae
- Genus: Amphixystis
- Species: A. anchiala

Binomial name
- Amphixystis anchiala (Meyrick, 1909)

Synonyms
- Gephyristis anchiala Meyrick, 1909; Oinophila certa Meyrick, 1918; Gephyristis oxystyla Meyrick, 1911

Species of moth

Amphixystis anchiala is a moth of the family Tineidae. It was described by Edward Meyrick in 1909 and is found in Madagascar, Nigeria, and South Africa.

This species has a wingspan of 13 mm, the forewings are dark fuscous with a rather broad whitish-ochreous dorsal stripe from base to apex. Its appearance is similar to Amphixystis cymataula (Meyrick, 1926) from Zimbabwe, from which it can be distinguished by genitalia examination only.

The larvae have been recorded feeding on Euphorbia resinifera, Citrullus colocynthis (Cucurbitaceae), Dioscorea alata and Dioscorea rotundata (Dioscoreaceae).
