= Prothinodes =

Scientific classification
- Kingdom: Animalia
- Phylum: Arthropoda
- Clade: Pancrustacea
- Class: Insecta
- Order: Lepidoptera
- Family: Tineidae
- Genus: Prothinodes; Meyrick, 1914

Genus of moths

Prothinodes is a genus of moths belonging to the family Tineidae.

== Species ==
- Prothinodes arvicola Meyrick, 1924
- Prothinodes grammocosma (Meyrick, 1888)
- Prothinodes lutata Meyrick, 1914
