= Amphixystis copidora =

Scientific classification
- Kingdom: Animalia
- Phylum: Arthropoda
- Class: Insecta
- Order: Lepidoptera
- Family: Tineidae
- Genus: Amphixystis
- Species: A. copidora

Binomial name
- Amphixystis copidora (Meyrick, 1915)

Synonyms
- Hieroxestis copidora Meyrick, 1915

Species of moth

Amphixystis copidora is a moth of the family Tineidae first described by Edward Meyrick in 1915. It is found in Sri Lanka.
