= Amphixystis fragosa =

Scientific classification
- Kingdom: Animalia
- Phylum: Arthropoda
- Class: Insecta
- Order: Lepidoptera
- Family: Tineidae
- Genus: Amphixystis
- Species: A. fragosa

Binomial name
- Amphixystis fragosa (Meyrick, 1910)

Synonyms
- Oinophila fragosa Meyrick, 1910

Species of moth

Amphixystis fragosa is a moth of the family Tineidae. This species is known from Mauritius and Réunion. On Réunion, adults are on wing year-round.

== Description ==
This species has a wingspan of 9–10 mm. The forewings are dark-bronzy fuscous with a white streak partially tinged with yellowish running along the dorsum and termen from the base to near the apex, broadest towards the posterior part of the dorsum, the upper edge somewhat prominent at one-fourth and forming an angular prominence at three-fifths, where it reaches half across the wing, beyond this very narrow. There are two oblique white strigae from the costa posteriorly, not reaching the termen. The extreme apex is suffused with blackish. The hindwings are light grey.

== Taxonomy ==
The species was first described by Edward Meyrick in 1910, as Oinophila fragosa. In 1997, it was transferred to genus Amphixystis by G. S. Robinson & K. Tuck.
