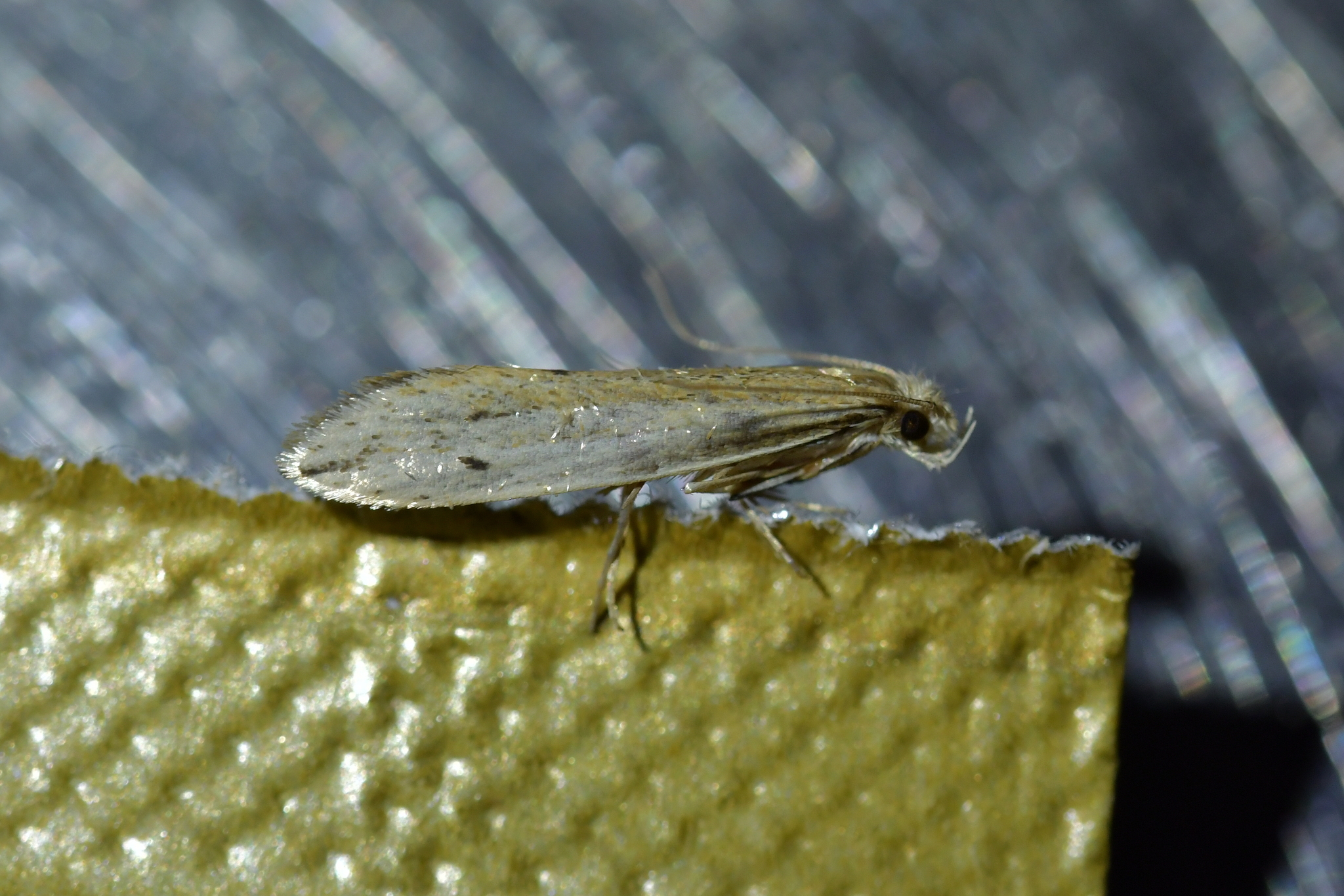

Scientific classification
- Kingdom: Animalia
- Phylum: Arthropoda
- Class: Insecta
- Order: Lepidoptera
- Family: Tineidae
- Genus: Prothinodes
- Species: P. lutata

Binomial name
- Prothinodes lutata Meyrick, 1914

= Prothinodes lutata =

Species of moth

Prothinodes lutata is a species of moth in the family Tineidae. It was described by Edward Meyrick in 1914. This species is endemic to New Zealand.
