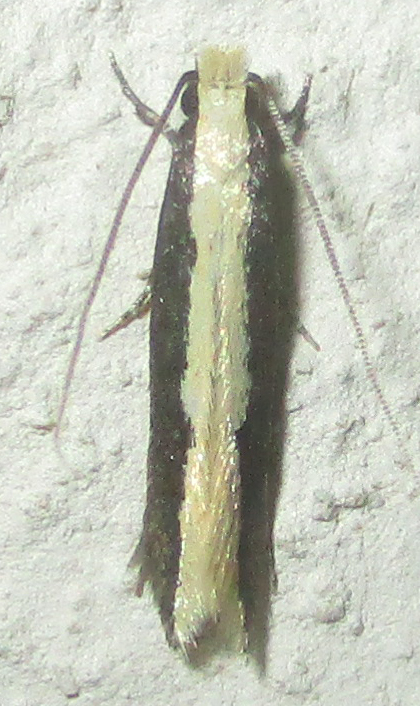

Scientific classification
- Kingdom: Animalia
- Phylum: Arthropoda
- Class: Insecta
- Order: Lepidoptera
- Family: Tineidae
- Genus: Amphixystis
- Species: A. cymataula

Binomial name
- Amphixystis cymataula (Meyrick, 1926)

Synonyms
- Sporadarthra cymataula Meyrick, 1926

= Amphixystis cymataula =

Species of moth

Amphixystis cymataula is a moth of the family Tineidae. It was described by Edward Meyrick in 1909 and is found in Zimbabwe.

This species has a wingspan of 11 mm. Palpi are dark fuscous, thorax whitish ochreous, tegulae dark fuscous. Abdomen dark grey. Forewings dark fuscous; a pale yellowish dorsal stripe, slightly tinged ferruginous, less than half breadth of wing, nearly of even width from base to tornus, where it is triangularly indented almost to margin, then continued on termen rather narrower and with edge irregularly sinuate to near apex: cilia grey, beneath apex a light yellowish patch. Hindwings dark grey; cilia grey.

In general appearance it is similar to Amphixystis anchiala (Meyrick, 1909) from South Africa, from which it can be distinct by genitalia examination only.
