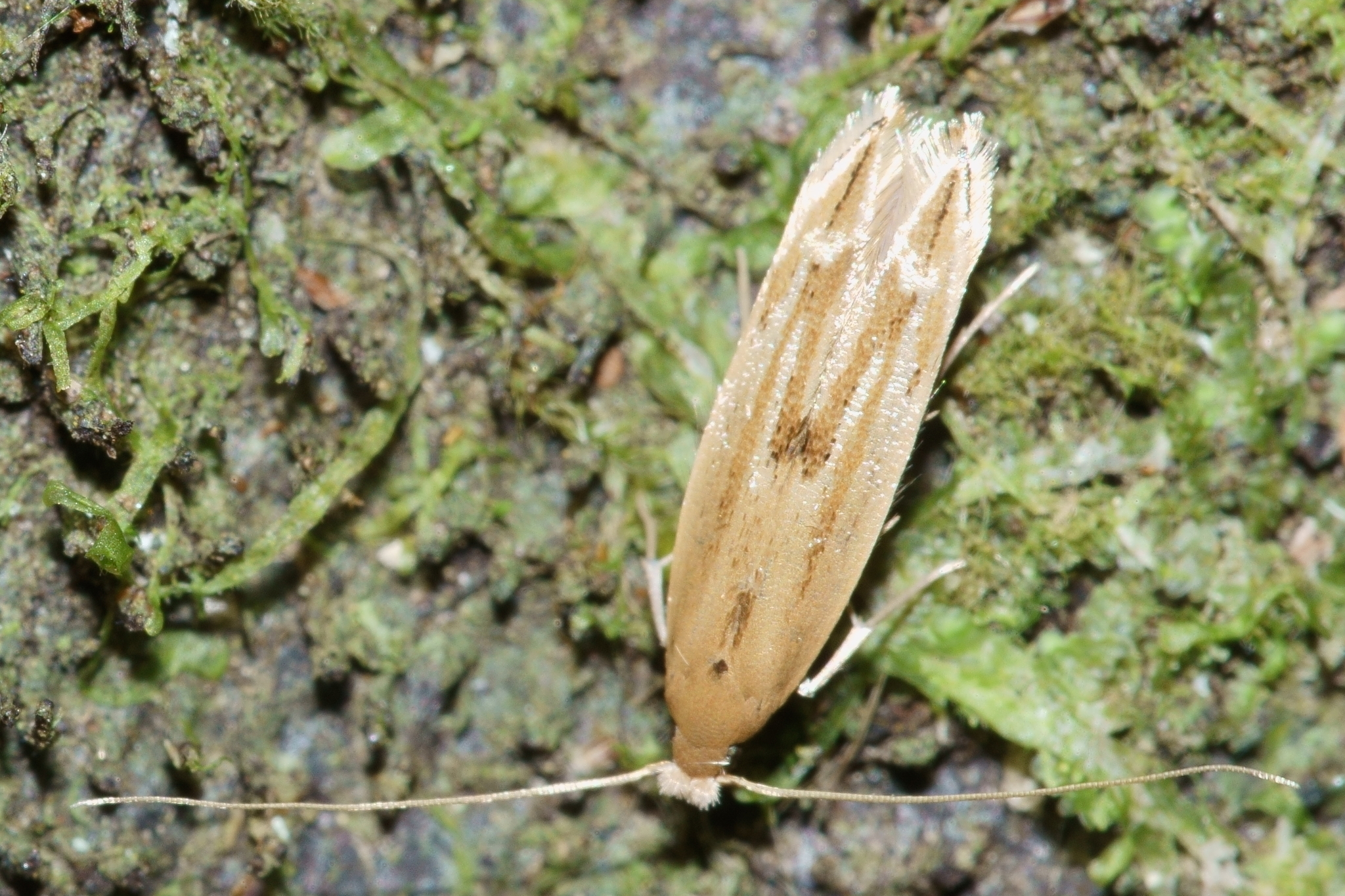

Scientific classification
- Kingdom: Animalia
- Phylum: Arthropoda
- Clade: Pancrustacea
- Class: Insecta
- Order: Lepidoptera
- Family: Tineidae
- Genus: Amphixystis
- Species: A. hapsimacha

Binomial name
- Amphixystis hapsimacha Meyrick, 1901

= Amphixystis hapsimacha =

Species of moth endemic to New Zealand

Amphixystis hapsimacha is a species of moth in the family Tineidae. This species was first described by Edward Meyrick in 1901. It is endemic to New Zealand.

== Taxonomy ==
This species was first described by Edward Meyrick in 1901 using a specimen collected by George Hudson in Wellington. A. hapsimacha was discussed and illustrated by Hudson in his 1928 book The butterflies and moths of New Zealand. The female holotype is held at the Natural History Museum, London.

== Description ==
Male illustrated by Hudson.

Female illustrated by Hudson.

Meyrick described the female of the species as follows:

♀. 13 mm. Head, palpi, antennae, thorax, abdomen, and legs whitish-ochreous. Forewings elongate-lanceolate; whitish-ochreous, with a few fuscous scales on veins; costal edge near apex dark fuscous: cilia whitish-ochreous, Hindwings brassy-grey ; cilia light grey, slightly purplish-tinged.

Hudson described the species as follows:

The expansion of the wings of the male is slightly over 1/2 inch, of the female 5/8 inch. The forewings are elongate, very narrow, with the costa almost straight, the apex acute and the termen extremely oblique; glossy ochreous-brown; there are three very faint brown streaks converging at the apex; the costal streak starts at about 2/3, the discal almost from the base, and the dorsal from before the middle; there is a cloudy patch of brown scales on the dorsum before the middle, followed by a series of dark brown scales; a V-shaped dark brown mark is situated at the apex; all these markings vary considerably in distinctness, and the ground colour in depth. The hind-wings are greyish-ochreous, with golden reflections.

== Distribution ==
A. hapsimacha is endemic to New Zealand. It has been observed in both the North and South Island.

== Habitat ==
This species inhabits dense native forest and frequents the dead leaves of tree-ferns, cabbage trees and Nikau Palms and Astelias.

== Behaviour ==
Adults are commonly observed between November and February. Adults have been observed at rest with the wings closed tightly over the back and held flat, so that the insect appears as an elongate ellipse. The antennae are placed backwards along the edges of the wings; the tips of the intermediate and posterior tarsi are visible; the anterior tarsi are placed forwards on each side of the head. When disturbed the insect runs with great rapidity. It also flies fast and is then exceedingly difficult to see. When in repose the entire insect closely resembles a small elongate seed-case or a minute fragment of dried leaf or bark.
