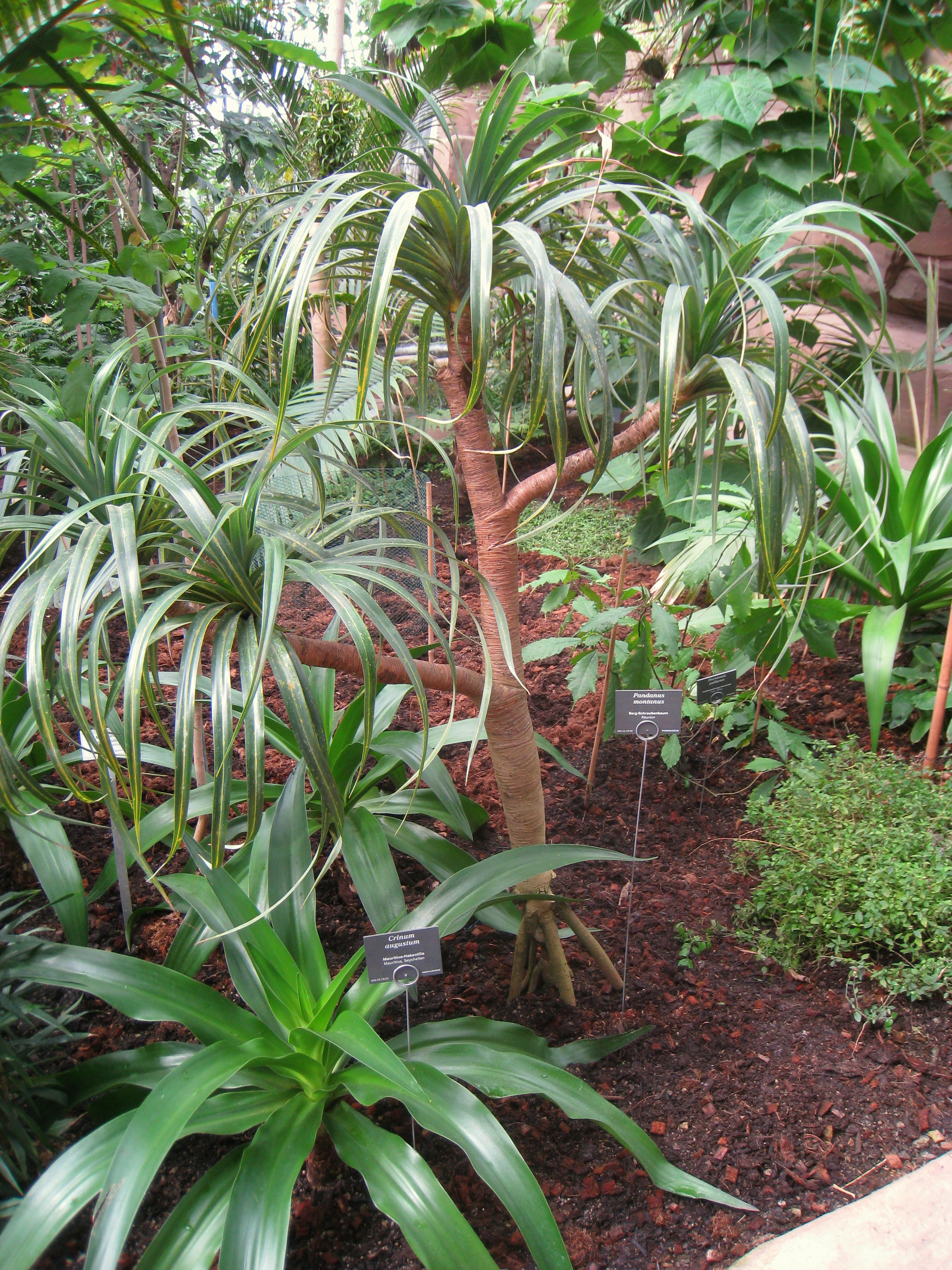
- Small specimen in cultivation at the Berlin Botanical Garden

Scientific classification
- Kingdom: Plantae
- Clade: Tracheophytes
- Clade: Angiosperms
- Clade: Monocots
- Order: Pandanales
- Family: Pandanaceae
- Genus: Pandanus
- Species: P. montanus

Binomial name
- Pandanus montanus Bory.

= Pandanus montanus =

Species of flowering plant

Pandanus montanus is a species of monocots in the genus Pandanus, that is found in wet forest at an elevation of 400–1700 meters.

== Description ==
It is a small, slender tree of 3–5 m in height. Its fruit-head is initially held up erectly, but droops down and becomes dark red when ripe. Each fruit head is packed with red, dome-shaped drupes.

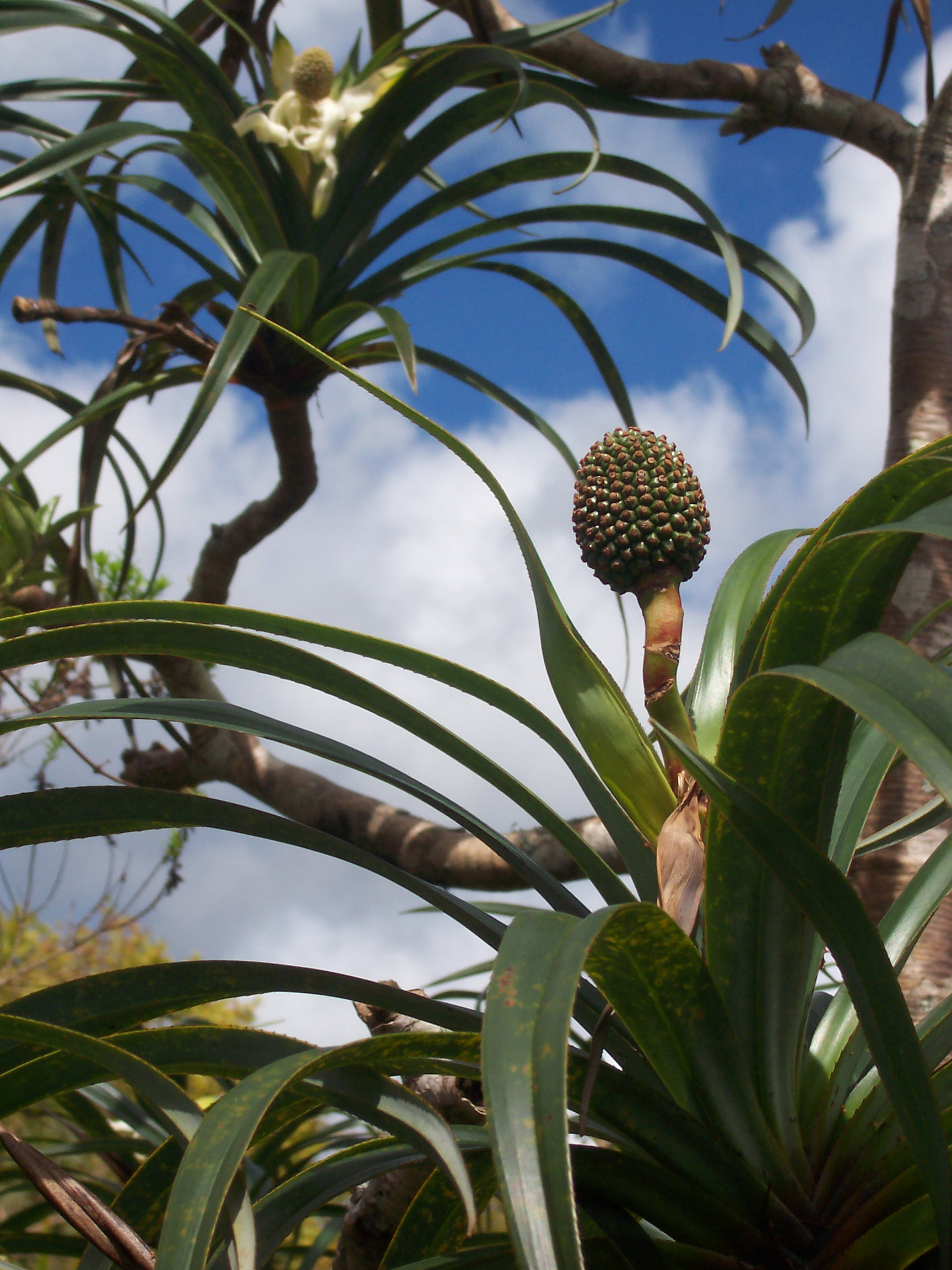
Fruit-head, born erect until it is ripe.

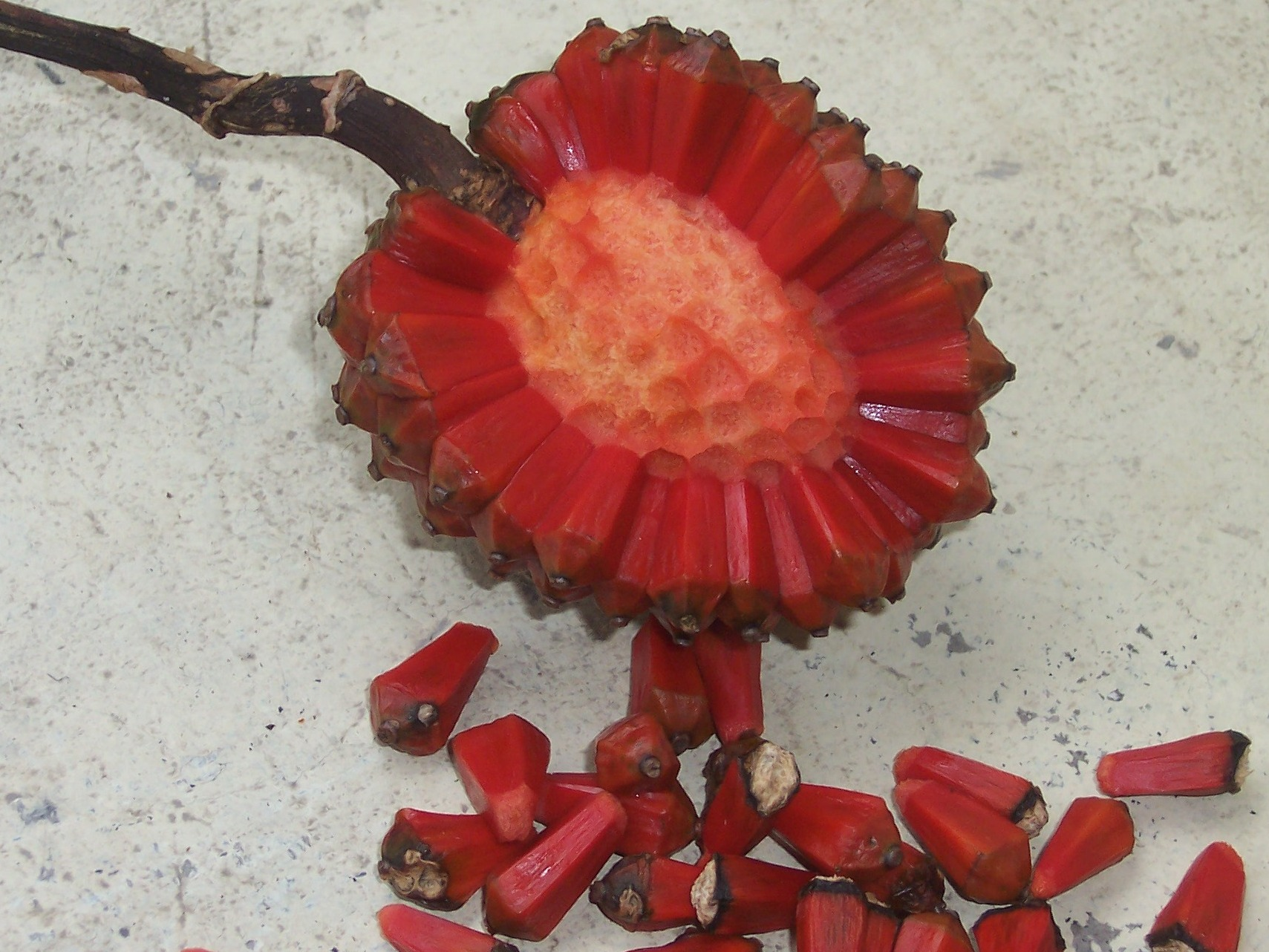
Fruit-head detail of the reddish ripe drupes.

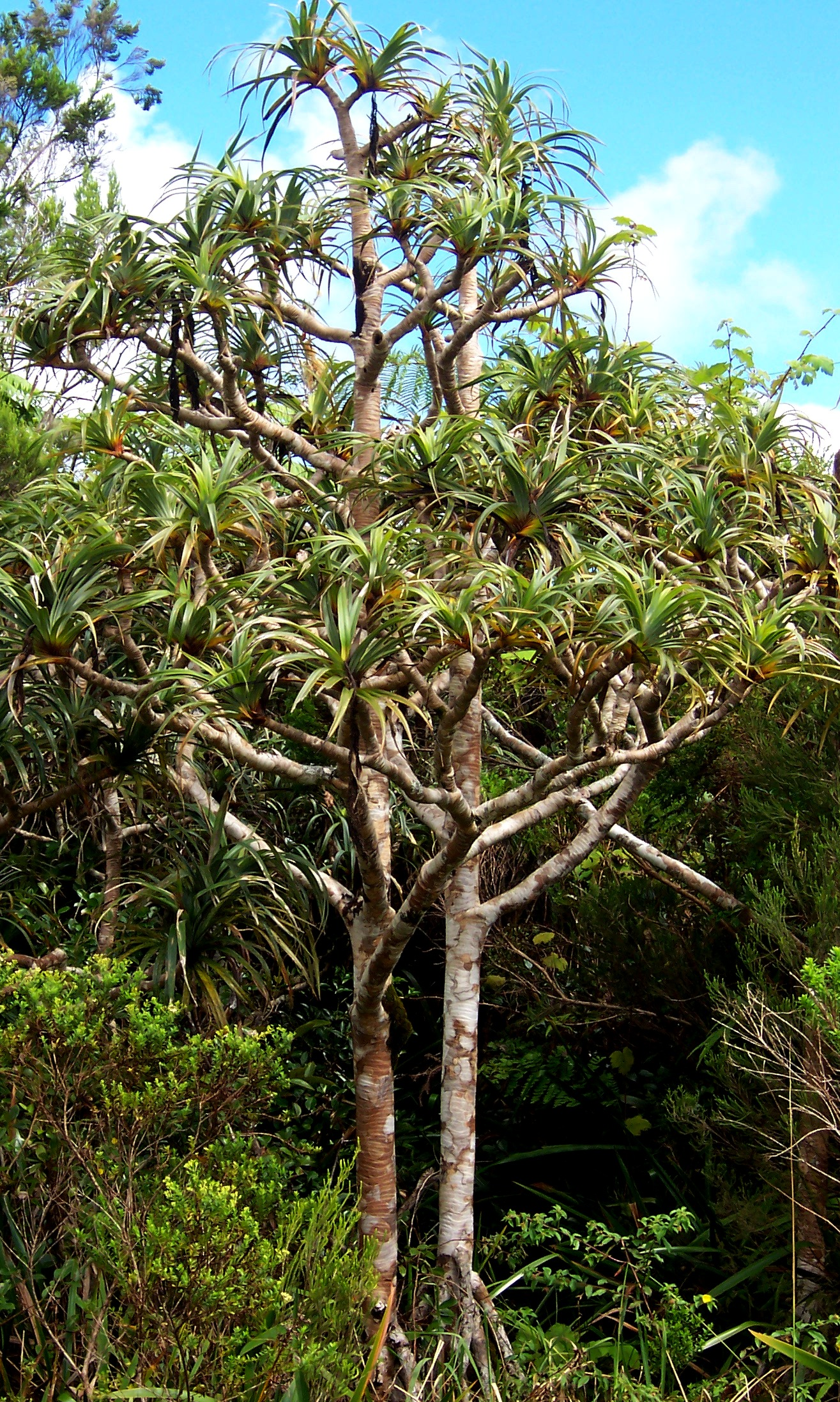
Adult specimen in habitat

== Synonyms ==
- Pandanus borbonicus Huynh
- Pandanus erigens Thouars
- Pandanus gaudichaudii Martelli
- Sussea conoidea Gaudich.
- Sussea microcarpa Gaudich.
