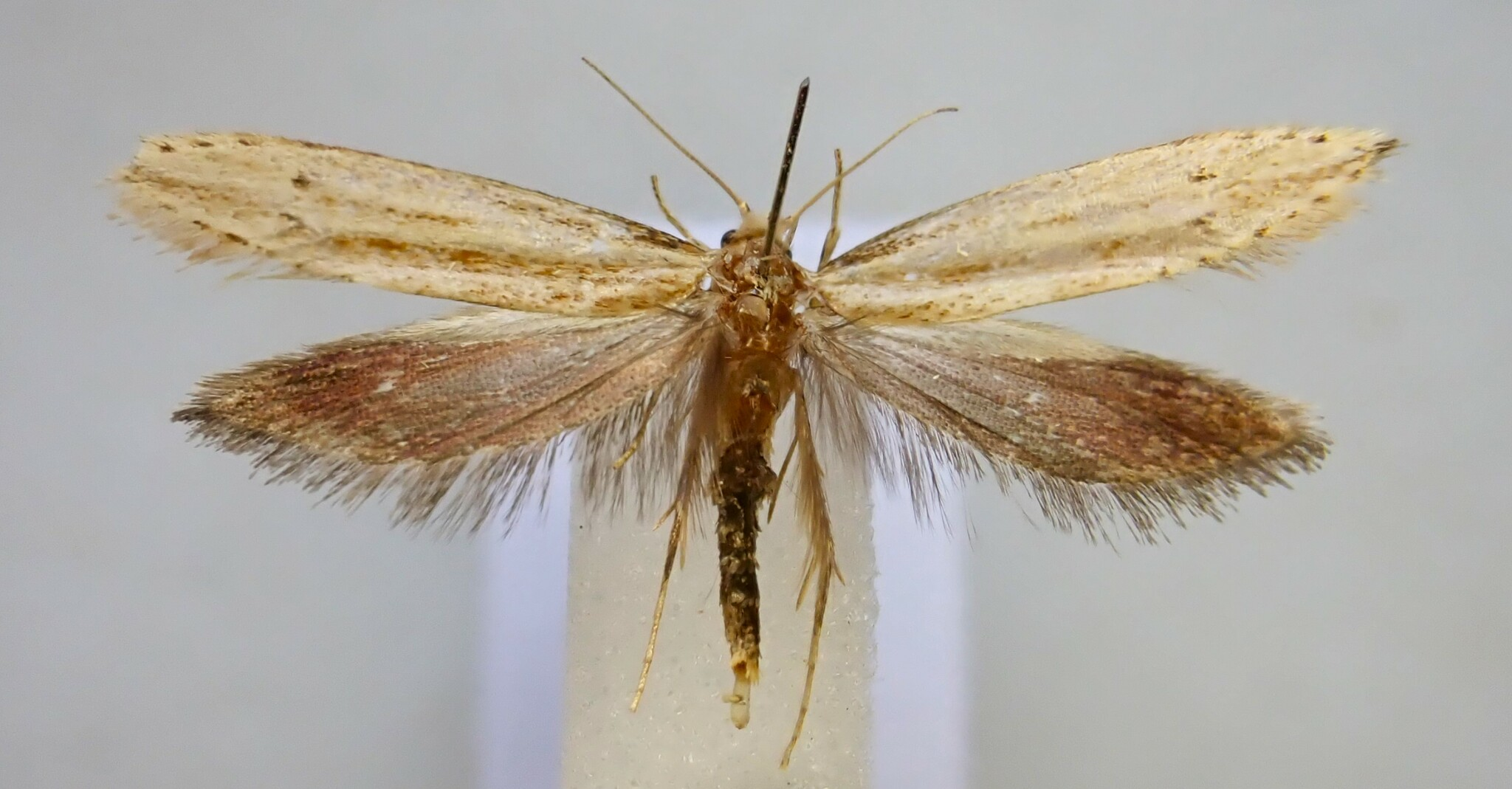

Scientific classification
- Kingdom: Animalia
- Phylum: Arthropoda
- Class: Insecta
- Order: Lepidoptera
- Family: Tineidae
- Genus: Prothinodes
- Species: P. grammocosma

Binomial name
- Prothinodes grammocosma (Meyrick, 1888)

Synonyms
- Tinea gammocosma Meyrick, 1888

= Prothinodes grammocosma =

Species of moth

Prothinodes grammocosma is a species of moth in the family Tineidae. It was described by Edward Meyrick in 1888. This species is endemic to New Zealand.
