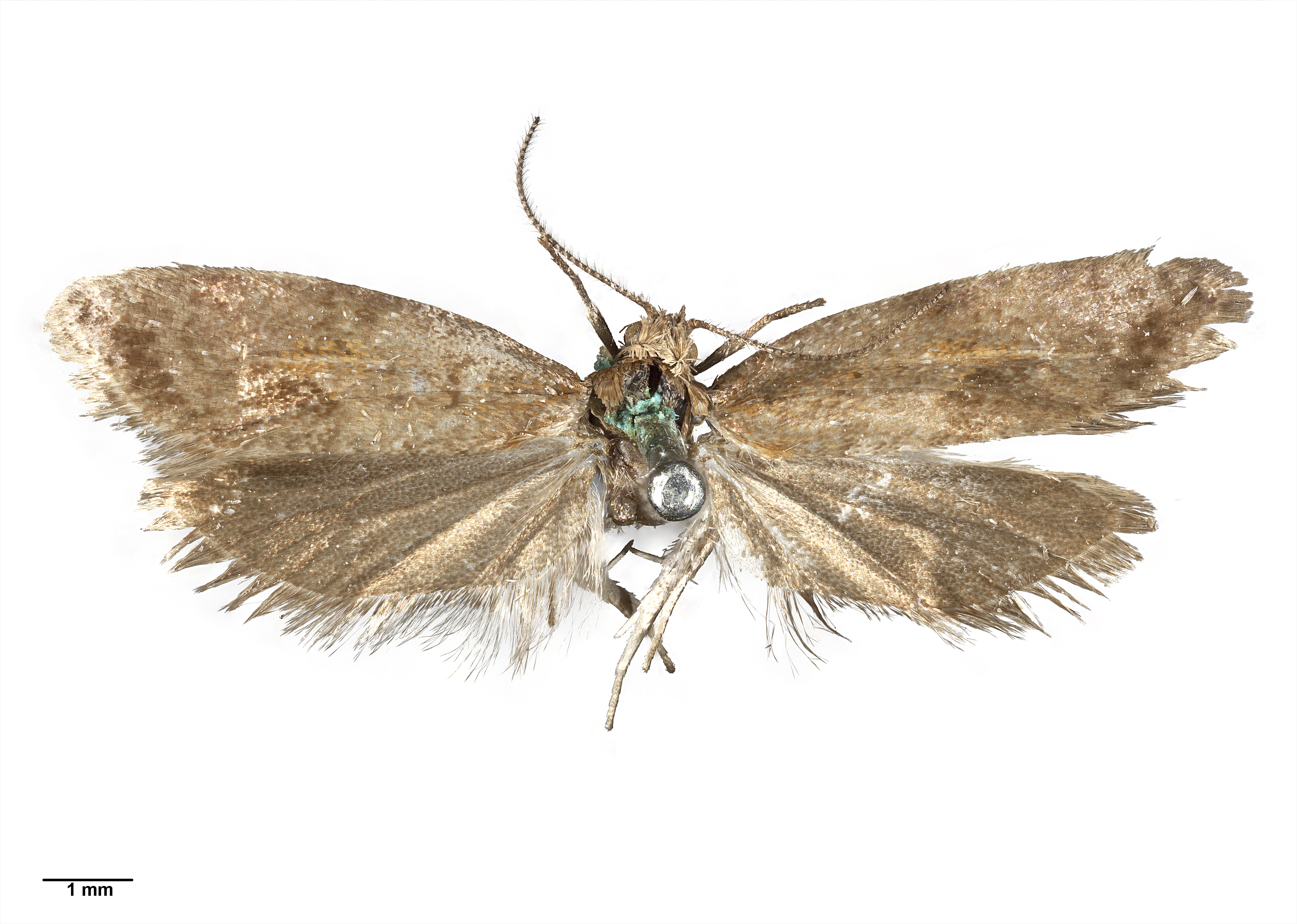
- Male holotype

Scientific classification
- Kingdom: Animalia
- Phylum: Arthropoda
- Clade: Pancrustacea
- Class: Insecta
- Order: Lepidoptera
- Family: Tortricidae
- Genus: Maoritenes
- Species: M. modesta

Binomial name
- Maoritenes modesta (Philpott, 1930)

Synonyms
- Pyrgotis modesta Philpott, 1930

= Maoritenes modesta =

Species of moth endemic to New Zealand

Maoritenes modesta is a species of moth in the family Tortricidae first described by Alfred Philpott in 1930. This species is endemic to New Zealand. It has been observed in glacial tills amongst shrubs in Westland including near the Franz Josef Glacier. Adults are on the wing in January.

== Taxonomy ==
This species was first described by Alfred Philpott in 1930 using a specimen collected by Charles Edwin Clarke in Waiho Gorge in Westland. George Hudson discussed and illustrated this species in his 1939 book A supplement to the butterflies and moths of New Zealand. Philpott originally named the species Pyrgotis modesta. In 1966 John S. Dugdale placed this species in the genus Maoritenes. The male holotype specimen is held at the Auckland War Memorial Museum.

== Description ==
Illustration of male.

Philpott described this species as follows:

♂. 13 mm. Head and palpi brown. Antennae fuscous brown, ciliations in ♂ 2. Thorax and abdomen bronzy brown. Legs ochreous irrorated with fuscous, anterior pair wholly fuscous. Forewings elongate, costa strongly arched, apex rounded, termen nearly straight, oblique, rounded beneath; bronzy brown; slightly reddish tinged in disc; an indistinct dark fuscous shade round termen: fringes greyish fuscous with fuscous basal line. Hindwings fuscous: fringes greyish fuscous with dark basal line.

Philpott pointed out this species was similar in appearance to Pyrgotis consentiens but that M. modesta was duller and had longer antennal pectinations, that is, the comb-like hairs that extend from the main shaft of adult male's antennae. Unlike its sister species M. cyclobathra, both sexes of M. modesta have rudimentary lensed ocelli (single-lens light-detecting organs) located on the dorsal surface of the head.

== Habitat ==
This species has been observed in moraines or glacial tills amongst shrubs.

== Distribution ==
This species is endemic to New Zealand and has been observed in Westland including at the type locality Waiho Gorge and also near the terminal of the Franz Josef Glacier where Hudson collected the male and female of the species in January 1937 and 1938.

== Behaviour ==
This species is on the wing in January.
