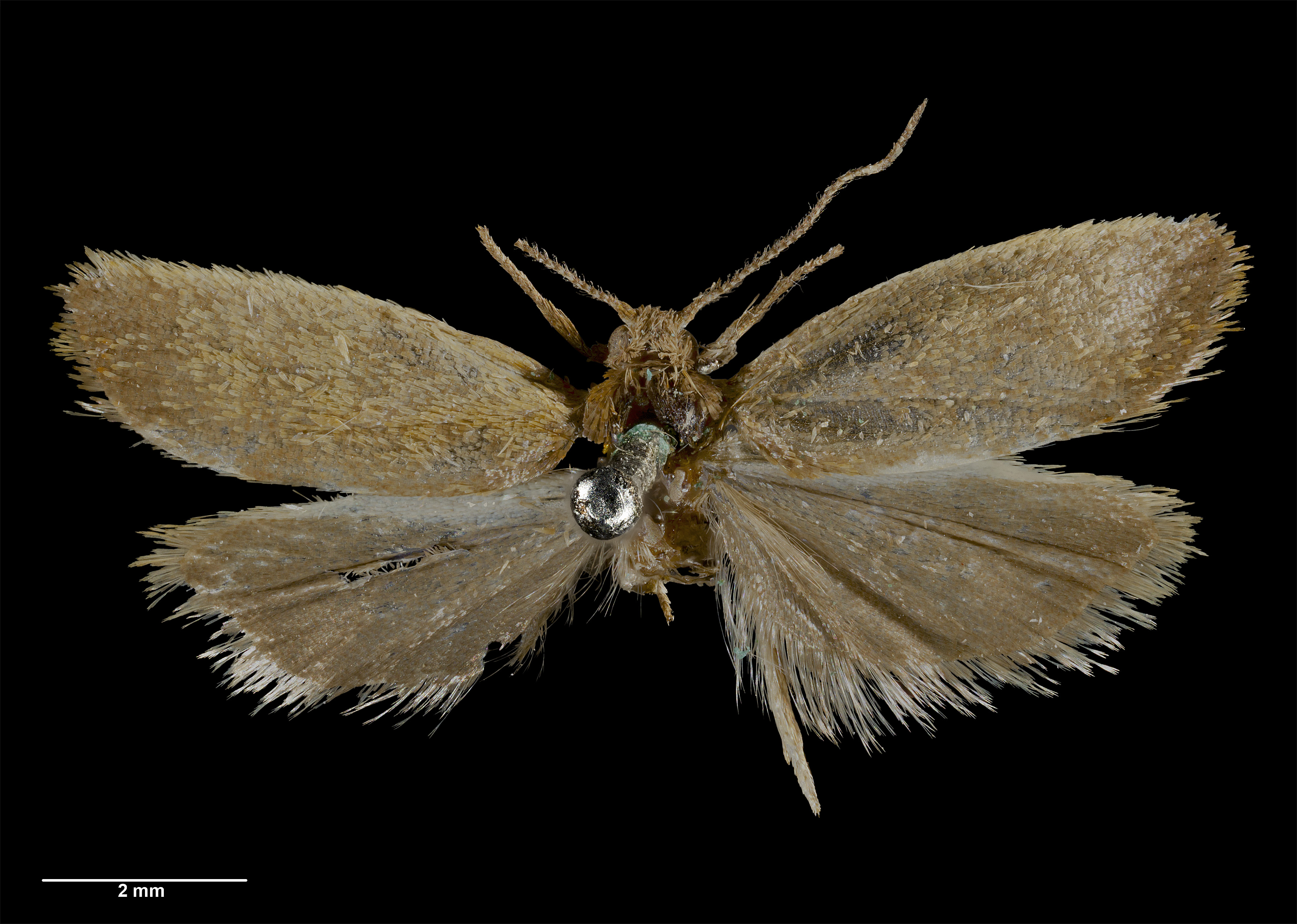
- Male holotype specimen collected by C. E. Clark.

Scientific classification
- Kingdom: Animalia
- Phylum: Arthropoda
- Clade: Pancrustacea
- Class: Insecta
- Order: Lepidoptera
- Family: Tortricidae
- Genus: Pyrgotis
- Species: P. humilis

Binomial name
- Pyrgotis humilis Philpott, 1930

= Pyrgotis humilis =

Species of moth endemic to New Zealand

Pyrgotis humilis is a species of moth of the family Tortricidae. It is endemic to New Zealand and has been observed in Otago. Adults are on the wing in November and December. Larvae have been raised on Veronica odata.

== Taxonomy ==
This species was first described by Alfred Philpott in 1930 from a specimen collected by Charles Edwin Clarke on Mount Maungatua in Otago. George Hudson discussed this species in his 1939 book A supplement to the Butterflies and Moths of New Zealand. In 1971 and again in 1988 John S. Dugdale confirmed the placement of this species in the genus Pyrgotis.

In 1988 Dugdale hypothesised that P. humilis and P. consentiens could be the same species as they each have the same host plant and the genitalia of each species is very similar.

== Description ==
Philpott described this species as follows

♂. 12 mm. Head and thorax brown mixed with ochreous. Palpi ochreous. Antennae ochreous annulated with black, ciliations in ♂ 1 1/2. Abdomen bronzy fuscous. Legs fuscous mixed with ochreous. Forewings elongate, costa strongly arched, apex rounded, termen subsinuate, oblique; bright ochreous; suffusedly purplish fuscous towards termen: fringes ochreous mixed with fuscous. Hindwings fuscous: fringes fuscous tipped with ochreous and with a darker basal line.

Philpott stated that this species was similar in appearance to Maoritenes modesta but that P. humilis could be distinguished based on its antennal characteristics.

== Distribution ==
This species is endemic to New Zealand and has been observed in Otago.

== Behaviour ==
Adults have been recorded on the wing in November and December.

== Host species ==
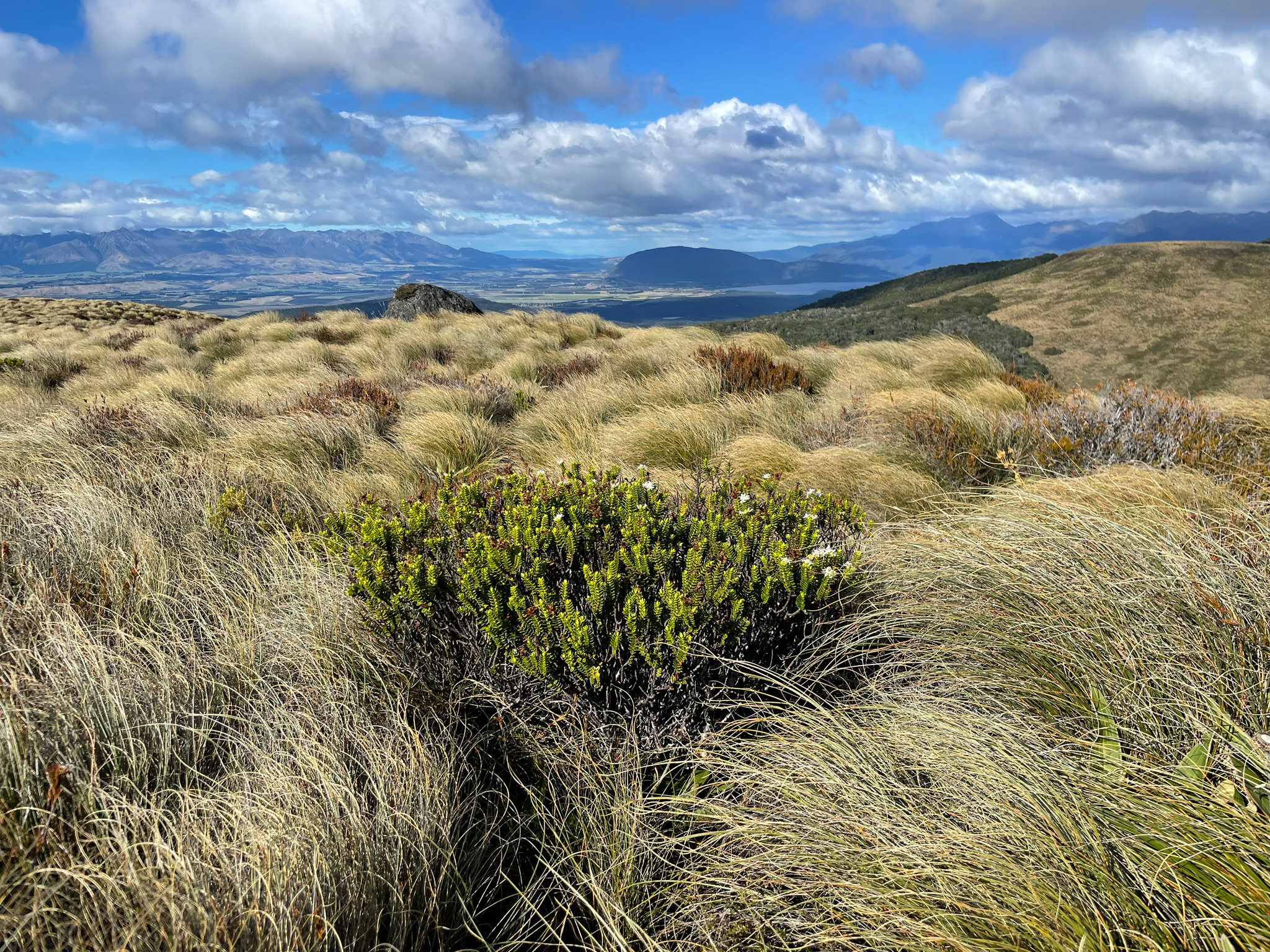
Larval host Veronica odora.

The larvae of this species have been raised on Veronica odata.
