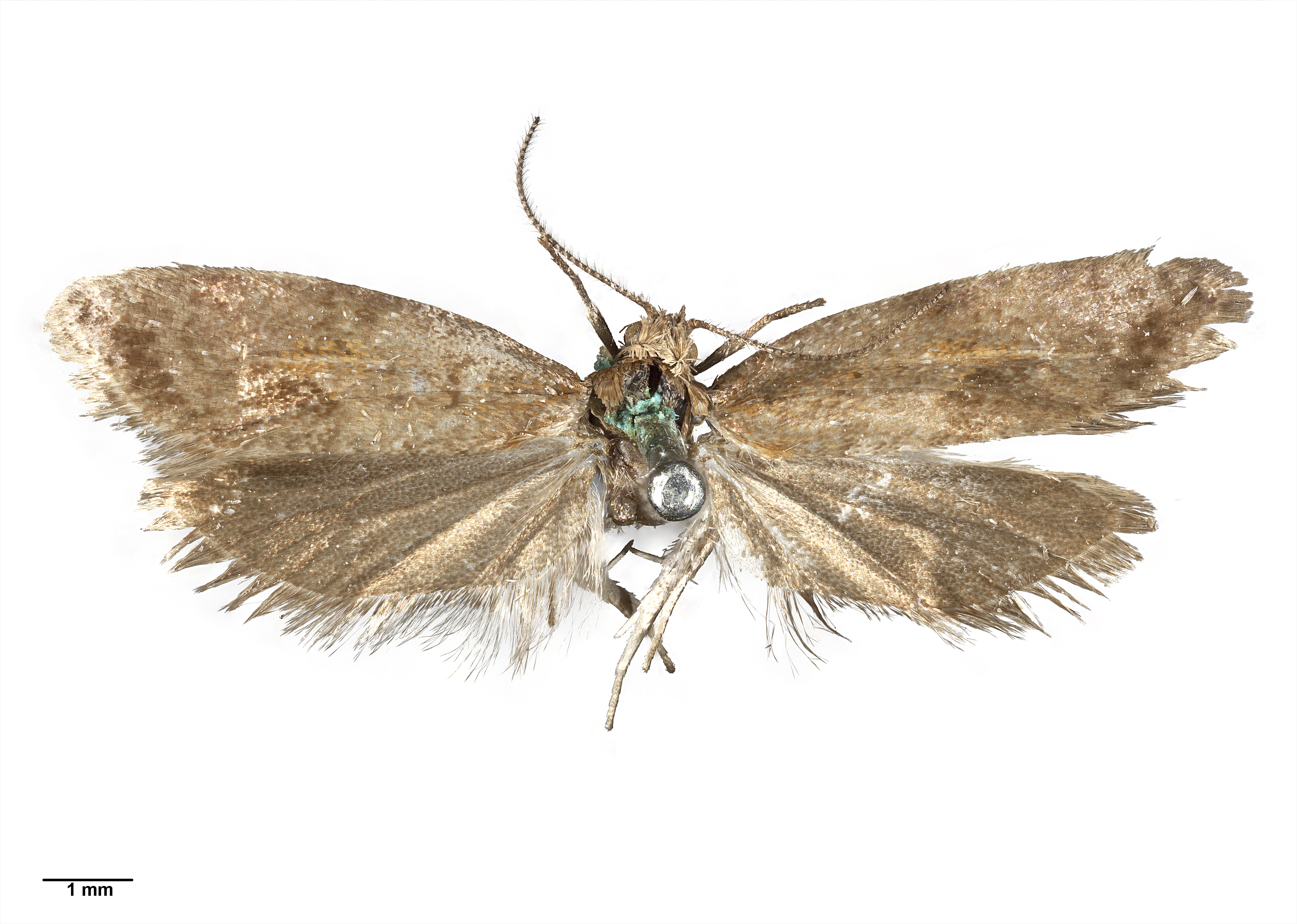
- Male holotype specimen of Maoritenes modesta.

Scientific classification
- Kingdom: Animalia
- Phylum: Arthropoda
- Clade: Pancrustacea
- Class: Insecta
- Order: Lepidoptera
- Family: Tortricidae
- Tribe: Schoenotenini
- Genus: Maoritenes; Dugdale, 1966

= Maoritenes =

Genus of moths

Maoritenes is a genus of moths belonging to the subfamily Tortricinae of the family Tortricidae. The genus was first described by John S. Dugdale in 1966.

== Species ==
- Maoritenes cyclobathra (Meyrick, 1907)
- Maoritenes modesta (Philpott, 1930)

== See also ==
- List of Tortricidae genera
