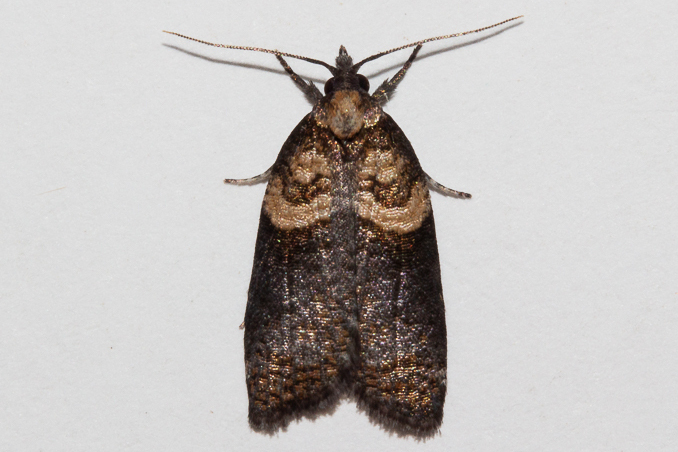
- Maoritenes cyclobathra found on the Otago Peninsula

Scientific classification
- Kingdom: Animalia
- Phylum: Arthropoda
- Clade: Pancrustacea
- Class: Insecta
- Order: Lepidoptera
- Family: Tortricidae
- Genus: Maoritenes
- Species: M. cyclobathra

Binomial name
- Maoritenes cyclobathra (Meyrick, 1907)

Synonyms
- Epagoge cyclobathra Meyrick, 1907; Capua cyclobathra (Meyrick, 1907)

= Maoritenes cyclobathra =

Species of moth endemic to New Zealand

Maoritenes cyclobathra is a species of moth of the family Tortricidae. It was first described by Edward Meyrick in 1907. It is endemic in New Zealand and is regarded as being rare. It has been observed in the North Island in the Wellington, Manawatū-Whanganui and the Waikato regions and in the South Island including in the Fiordland, Southland, and Otago regions. This species frequents native forest where it inhabits low undergrowth. Adults are on the wing from November until April and are attracted to light.

== Taxonomy ==
This species was first described by Edward Meyrick in 1907 using two specimens collected in Invercargill by Alfred Philpott in January and February and was originally named Epagoge cyclobathra. In 1911 Meyrick placed this species in the genus Capua. George Hudson discussed and illustrated this species under the name Capua cyclobathra in his 1928 book The butterflies and moths of New Zealand. In 1928 Alfred Philpott discussed and illustrated the male genitalia of this species. In 1966 John S. Dugdale placed this species in the genus Maoritenes. The male lectotype, collected in Invercargill, is held at the Natural History Museum, London.

== Description ==
Illustration by Des Helmore

Live moth.

Meyrick described this species as follows:

♀♂. 16-18 mm. Head, palpi, and thorax rather dark fuscous. Abdomen pale grey. Forewings elongate, suboblong, costa moderately arched, apex obtuse, termen hardly rounded, rather oblique ; fuscous, slightly purplish-tinged, sprinkled with dark fuscous, towards middle of costa suffused with dark ashy-fuscous, towards termen mixed with reddish-ochreous and strigulated with dark fuscous ; basal 2/5 whitish-ochreous, marked with several deeper ochreous striae, outer edge curved ; within this patch an irregular dark-fuscous streak from base of dorsum along costa to 1/4, thence proceeding as a curved transverse streak to sub-median fold : cilia grey, with dark fuscous median line. Hind-wings light grey ; cilia whitish-grey, with darker subbasal line.

Hudson regarded this species as distinctly marked. The female has single-lens light-detecting organs (lensed ocelli) located on the dorsal surface of the head whereas in the male these are only rudimentary. The female also has longer palpi.

== Distribution ==
This species is endemic to New Zealand. It has been observed in the North Island in the Wellington, Manawatū-Whanganui and the Waikato regions and in the South Island including in the Fiordland, Southland, and Otago regions. It is regarded as rare.

== Habitat ==
This species frequents native forest where it inhabits low undergrowth.

== Behaviour ==
Adults are on the wing from November until April. Adults are attracted to light.
