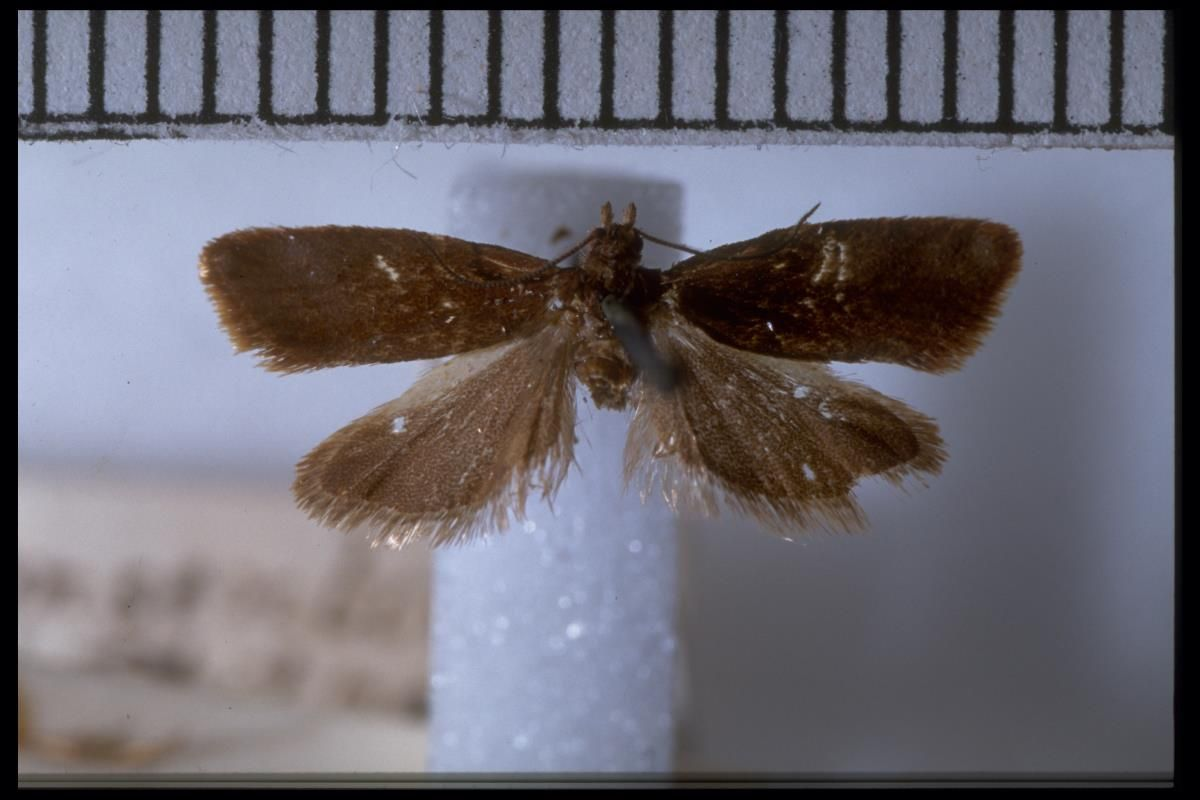
- Male holotype specimen

Scientific classification
- Kingdom: Animalia
- Phylum: Arthropoda
- Clade: Pancrustacea
- Class: Insecta
- Order: Lepidoptera
- Family: Tortricidae
- Genus: Pyrgotis
- Species: P. consentiens

Binomial name
- Pyrgotis consentiens Philpott, 1916

= Pyrgotis consentiens =

Species of moth endemic to New Zealand

Pyrgotis consentiens is a species of moth of the family Tortricidae. It was first described by Alfred Philpott in 1916 and is endemic to New Zealand. This species has been collected in Fiordland, Southland and on Stewart Island and inhabits scrub dominated by species of Veronica and Cassinia. Adults are on the wing in December and January. The larval host of P. consentiens is Veronica odora.

== Taxonomy ==
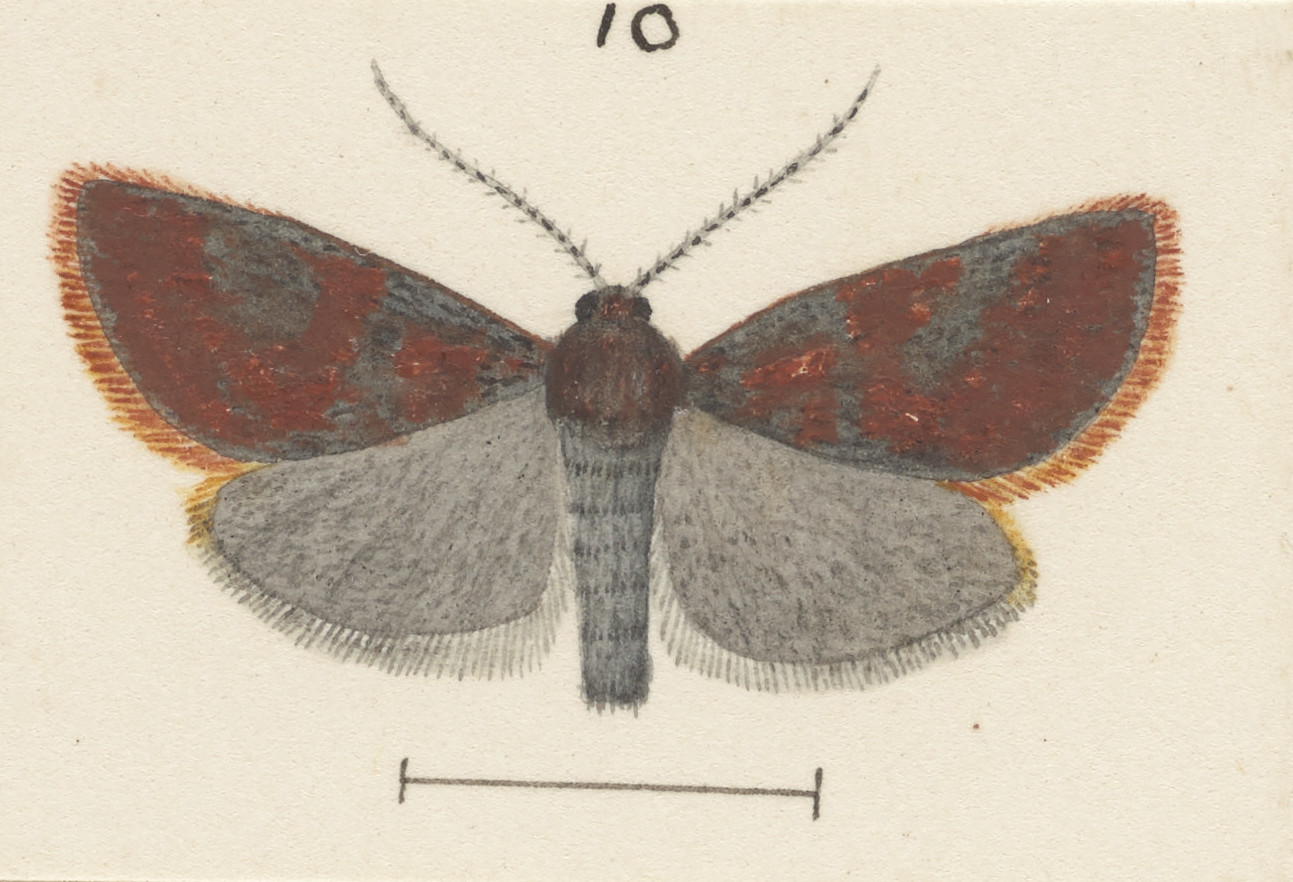
Illustration of species by Hudson.

This species was first described by Alfred Philpott in 1916. George Hudson discussed and illustrated this species under this name in his 1928 book The butterflies and moths of New Zealand. In 1928 Philpott studied the male genitalia of this species. In 1971 and again in 1988 John S. Dugdale confirmed the placement of this species in the genus Pyrgotis. The male holotype, collected by Philpott at Mt. Cleughearn in the Hunter Mountains, is held at the New Zealand Arthropod Collection.

In 1988 Dugdale hypothesised that P. consentiens and P. humilis could be the same species as they each have the same host plant and the genitalia of each species is very similar.

== Description ==
Philpott described this species as follows:

♂♀. 12-15 mm. Head, palpi, and thorax dark purplish-red. Abdomen fuscous. Forewings oblong, costa gently arched, apex rounded, termen subsinuate ; purplish-red ; sometimes a white fascia from 1/4 costa to before middle of dorsum, narrowest towards costa, sometimes upper portion obsolete : cilia reddish-ochreous. Hindwings fuscous : cilia fuscous-grey with a darker basal line, reddish-ochreous round apex.

== Distribution ==
This species is endemic to New Zealand and has been collected in the South Island, in Fiordland and Southland, and also on Stewart Island.

== Behaviour ==
Adults are on the wing in December and January.

== Habitat and hosts ==
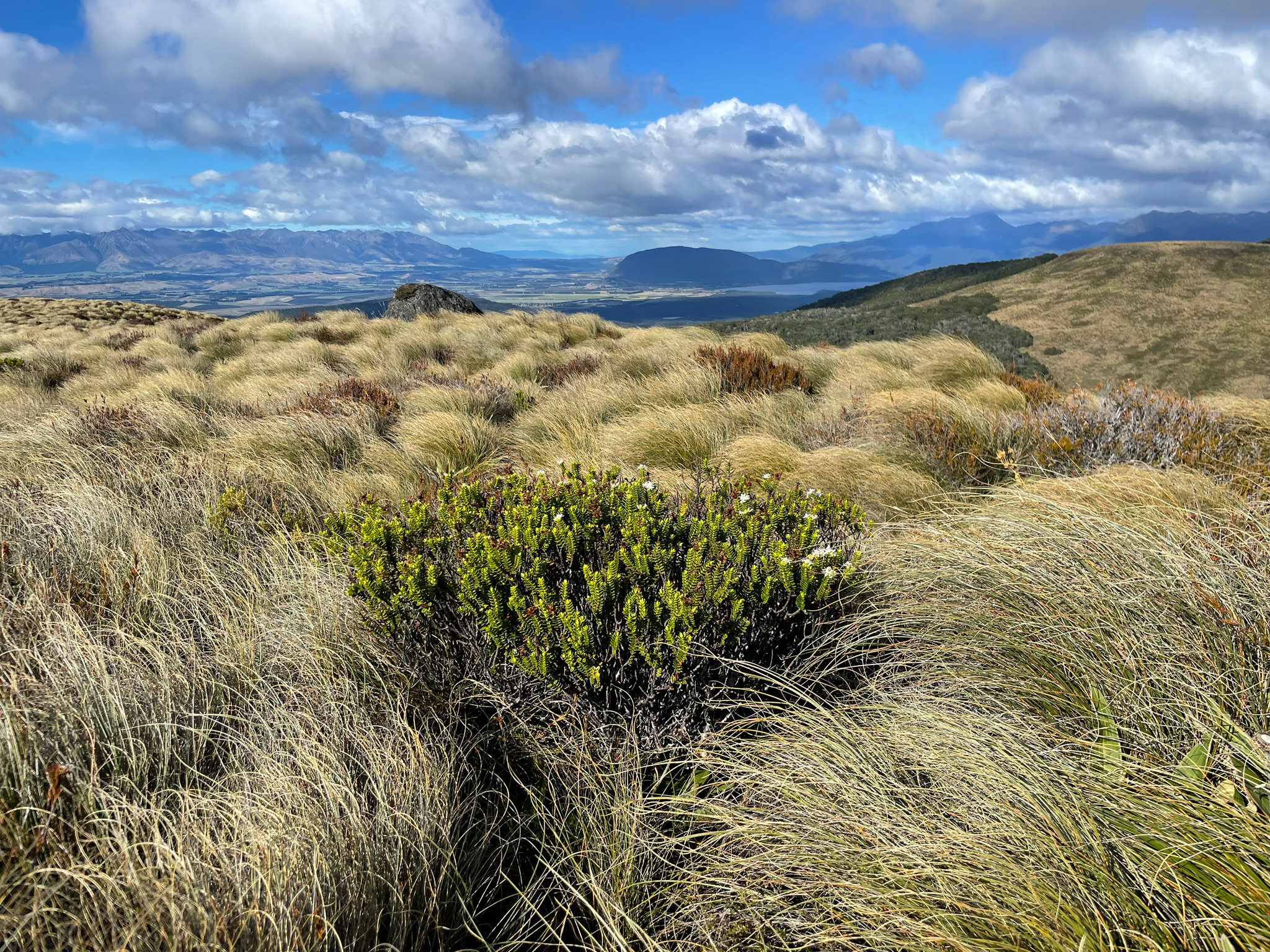
V. odora in Fiordland.

P. consentiens inhabits alpine scrub dominated by species of Veronica and Cassinia. The larvae fix together the leaves of Veronica odora with silk and then proceed to feed on the leaves of that plant.
