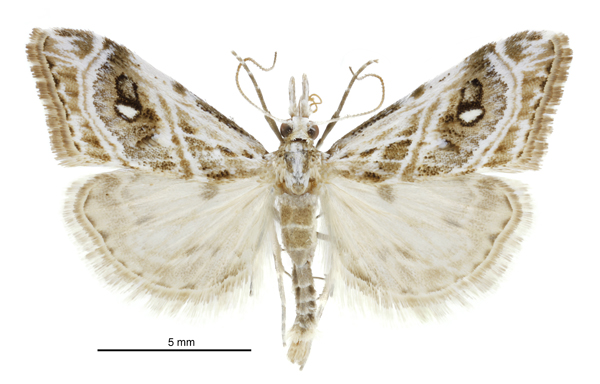
- Gadira acerella male

Scientific classification
- Kingdom: Animalia
- Phylum: Arthropoda
- Clade: Pancrustacea
- Class: Insecta
- Order: Lepidoptera
- Family: Crambidae
- Subfamily: Crambinae
- Tribe: Chiloini
- Genus: Gadira; Walker, 1866

Type species
- Gadira acerella Walker, 1866

Synonyms
- Cryptomima Meyrick, 1882; Scenoploca Meyrick, 1882

= Gadira (moth) =

Genus of moths

Gadira is a genus of moths of the family Crambidae. This genus is endemic to New Zealand.

== Taxonomy ==
This species was first described by Francis Walker in 1866 and named Gadira. The type species of this genus is Gadira acerella by original monotypy.

== Description ==
Walker originally described this genus as follows:

Female. Body rather slender. Proboscis short. Palpi porrect, broad, obtuse, thickly clothed with short hairs beneath, shorter than the breadth of the head; third joint very minute. Antennae slender. Abdomen extending much beyond the hind wings. Legs rather long, moderately stout; spurs long, slender. Wings long. Fore wings narrow, hardly acute; costa hardly convex; exterior border slightly convex, very oblique.

== Species ==
The species found in this genus are:

- Gadira acerella Walker, 1866
- Gadira leucophthalma (Meyrick, 1882)
- Gadira petraula (Meyrick, 1882)
