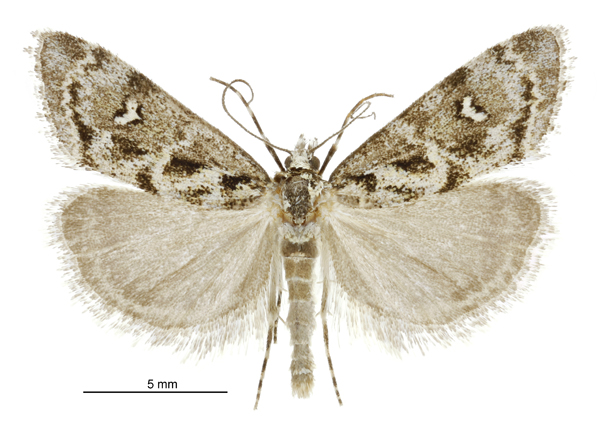
- Male
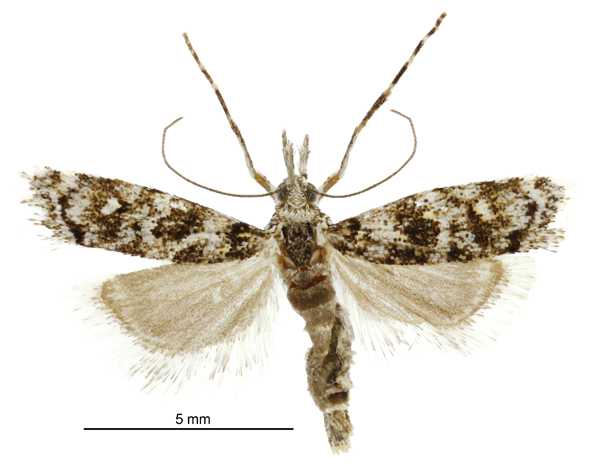
- Female

Scientific classification
- Kingdom: Animalia
- Phylum: Arthropoda
- Clade: Pancrustacea
- Class: Insecta
- Order: Lepidoptera
- Family: Crambidae
- Subfamily: Crambinae
- Tribe: Chiloini
- Genus: Gadira
- Species: G. petraula

Binomial name
- Gadira petraula (Meyrick, 1882)

Synonyms
- Scenoploca petraula Meyrick, 1882

= Gadira petraula =

Species of moth endemic to New Zealand

Gadira petraula is a species of moth in the family Crambidae. This species is endemic to New Zealand and is only found in mid Canterbury. G. petraula inhabits coastal, montane and low alpine rock sites. The larvae live in rock crevices in a silk shelter from which they emerge to feed. Their host plants are moss or lichens. The adult female is flightless and the male is on the wing in March. This species is classified as "At Risk, Naturally Uncommon" by the Department of Conservation. The 2010 and 2011 Christchurch earthquakes destroyed much of this species preferred habitat. Rock climbers cleaning rocks of the larval host plants are also a threat to the survival of this species.

== Taxonomy ==
This species was first described by Edward Meyrick in 1882 using specimens he collected on the Lyttelton Hills and named Scenoploca petraula. In 1883 Meyrick gave a much more detailed description of the species. George Hudson discussed and illustrated this species under that same name in his 1928 publication The Butterflies and Moths of New Zealand. In 1973 David Edward Gaskin placed this species within the genus Gadira. The lectotype specimen is held at the Natural History Museum, London.

== Description ==
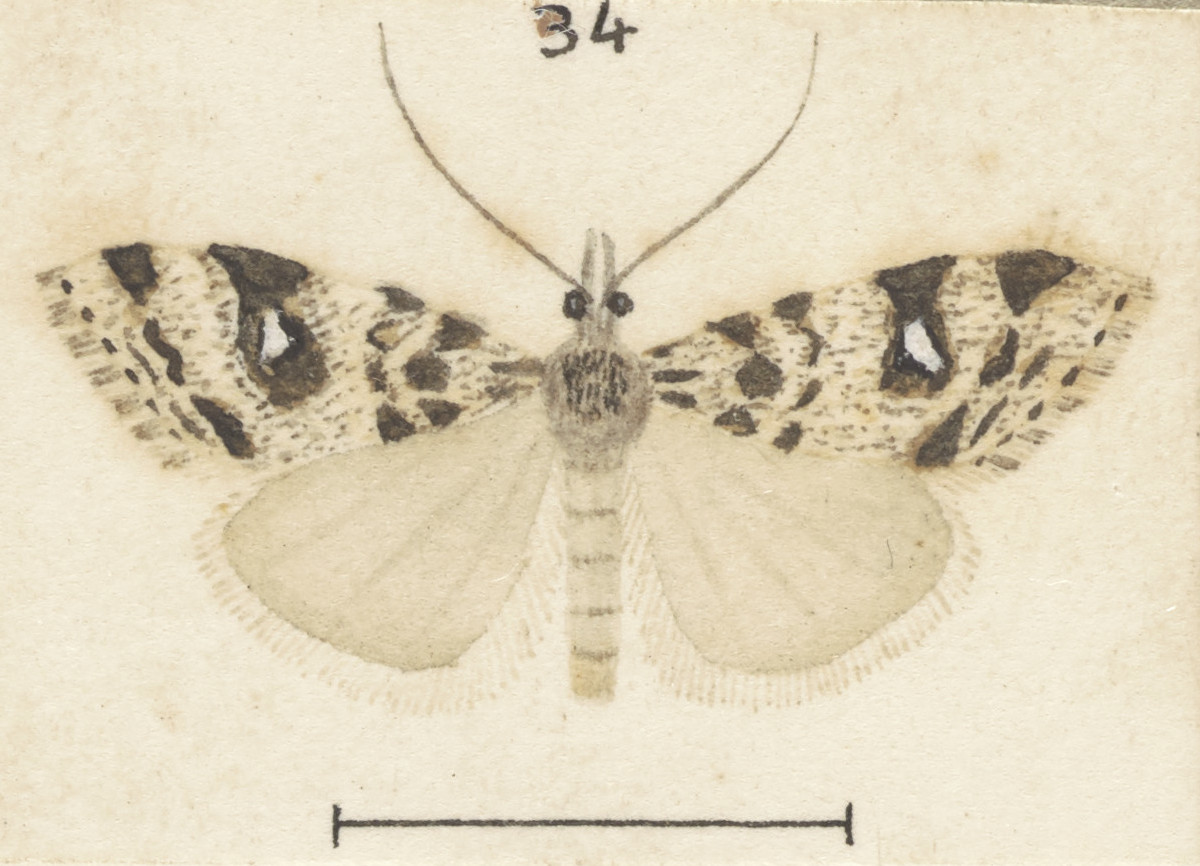
Illustration of G. petraula by George Hudson.

Meyrick described the larvae of this species as follows:

Larva moderately stout, cylindrical, wrinkled, very sluggish; rather dark greyish-fuscous on back, much lighter on sides; spots minute, blackish, obscure; head fuscous.

Hudson described the adult moths of the species as follows:

The expansion of the wings of the male is slightly over 5/8 inch, of the female about 1/2 inch. The fore-wings of the male are rather elongate, triangular, with the termen oblique; white with blackish-grey markings and very slightly tinged with ocherous; there is an irregular basal patch; a broad curved band preceding the first line and a narrow band following it; a large irregular discal patch, darker on the costa, surrounding a single, clear white, reniform spot; a conspicuous black sub-apical patch, and two wavy blackish transverse lines, indicating the position of the second line; a series of blackish terminal dots. The hind-wings are pale grey. The female has the fore-wings very narrow oblong and the hind-wings proportionately shorter and rounded; the markings resemble those in the male but are cramped and obscured.

The adults of this species are very similar to that of Gadira leucophthalma however G. petraula is slightly smaller and their forewing dorsum has a grey and black pattern in contrast to the more whitish grey in G. leucophthalma. Another distinguishing feature is that the female of G. petraula is short winged.

== Distribution ==
This species is endemic to New Zealand. This species is only known from Mid Canterbury. The record of this species from Stephens Island is as a result of a misidentification and the record from Australia likely results from Meyrick gifting one of his New Zealand specimens to an Australian collector.

== Biology and behaviour ==
The adult female of this species is flightless. The males have been recorded on the wing in March. Adults have also been found mid October to up to December depending on the altitude of the habitat in which the moths live. It has been hypothesised that there are likely a succession of generations of the moth within a calendar year.

== Host species and habitat ==
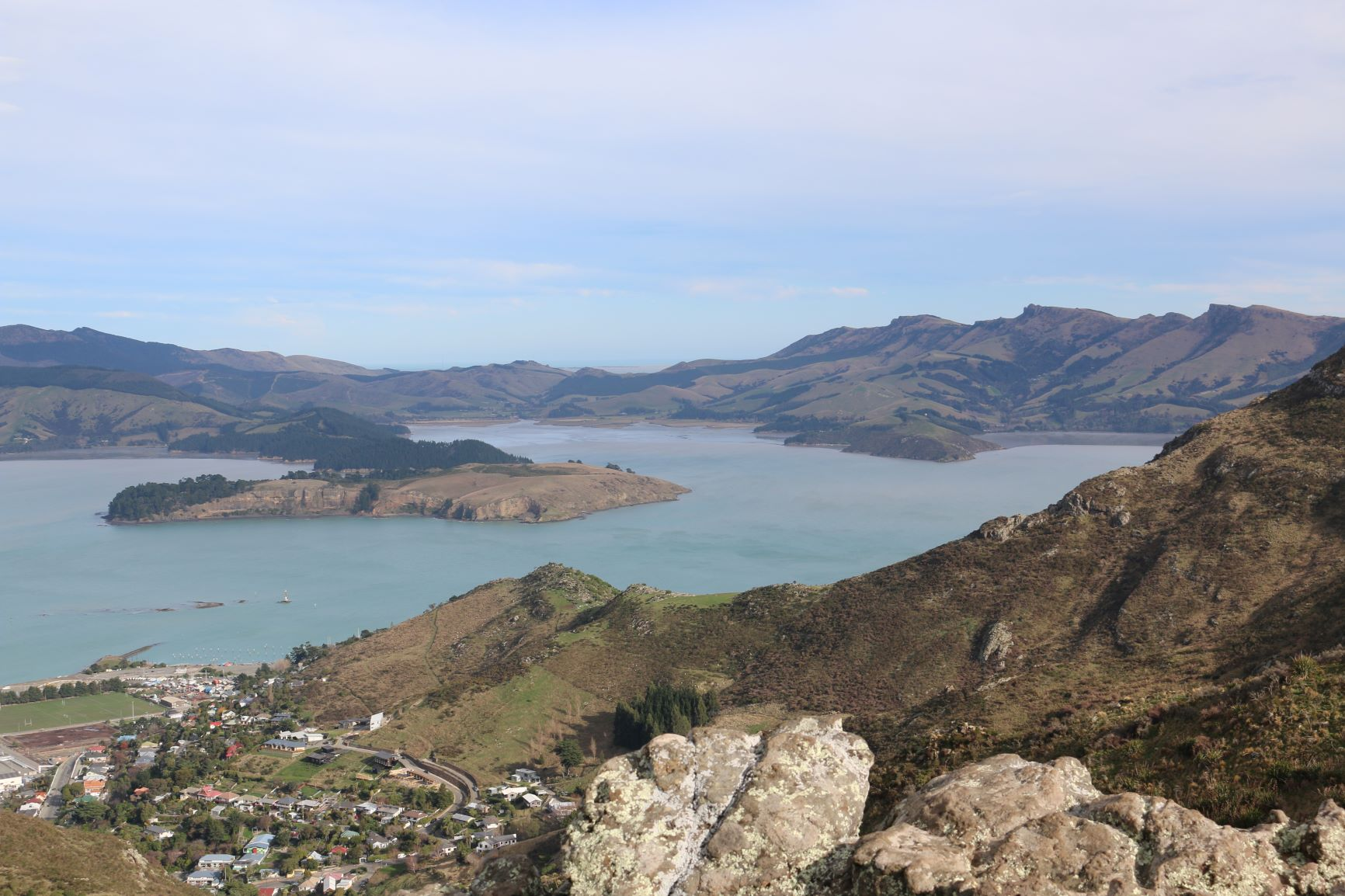
Lyttelton hills, type locality of G. petraula.

The larvae of G. petraula feed on moss or lichens growing on volcanic rocks. They live in crevices, creating a shelter of silk from which they emerge to feed. This species preferred habitat is coastal, montane, and low alpine rocky sites.

== Conservation status ==
This species has been classified as having the "At Risk, Naturally Uncommon" conservation status under the New Zealand Threat Classification System. Both the habitat and type locality of this species is at risk due to urbanisation. The 2010-2011 Christchurch earthquakes destroyed or damaged much of this species habitat. Another threat is the cleaning of rock faces by rock climbers.
