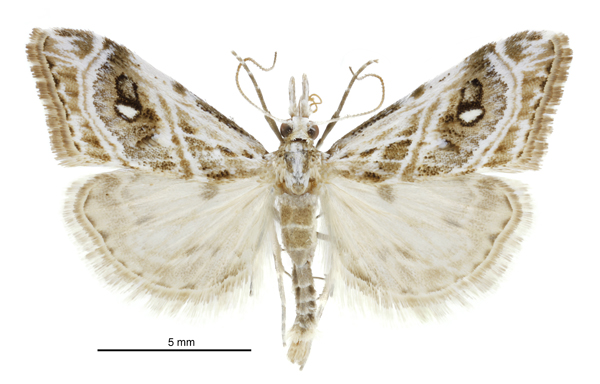
- Male

Scientific classification
- Kingdom: Animalia
- Phylum: Arthropoda
- Class: Insecta
- Order: Lepidoptera
- Family: Crambidae
- Subfamily: Crambinae
- Tribe: Chiloini
- Genus: Gadira
- Species: G. acerella

Binomial name
- Gadira acerella Walker, 1866

Synonyms
- Botys mahanga C. Felder, R. Felder & Rogenhofer, 1875; Botys mehanga Gaskin, 1973

= Gadira acerella =

Species of moth

Gadira acerella is a moth in the family Crambidae. It was first described by Francis Walker. It is endemic to New Zealand and is found throughout the country. The species inhabits native forest from sea level up to subalpine altitudes. Larvae are assumed to feed on lichen or moss. Adults are on the wing from October until March, are active at night and are attracted to light. This species is distinctively patterned and coloured and is said to resemble a bird dropping at rest. The colouring also assists to camouflage the moth when it rests against lichen.

== Taxonomy ==
This species was first described by Francis Walker in 1866 using specimens collected in Nelson by T. R. Oxley. In 1875, thinking they were describing a new species, Cajetan von Felder and Alois Friedrich Rogenhofer named this species Botys mahanga. This name was synonymised by Edward Meyrick in 1883. In 1928 George Hudson discussed and illustrated this species in his book The butterflies and moths of New Zealand. D. E. Gaskin, in 1973, discussed this synonym but incorrectly spelt the epithet as mehanga. The male holotype is held at the Natural History Museum, London.

== Description ==
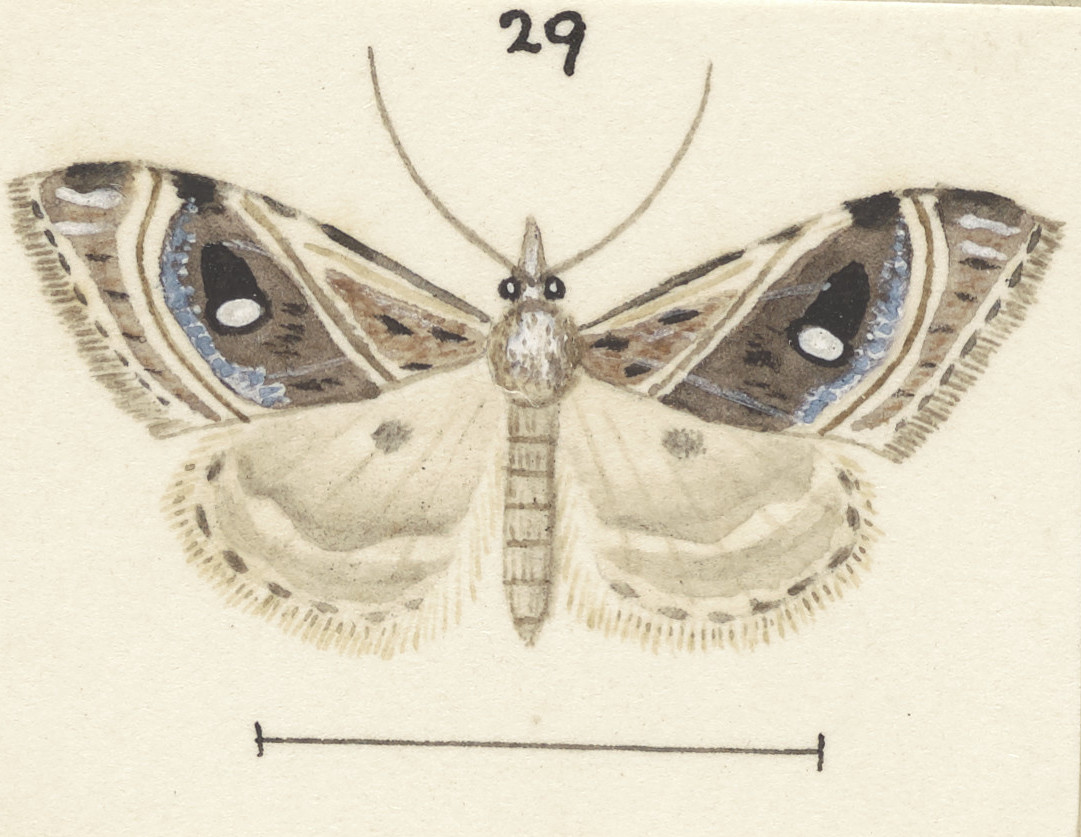
Illustration by George Hudson.

Walker described the female of the species as follows:

Female. Aeneous-brown, whitish beneath. Head whitish. Thorax with a whitish stripe. Abdomen and hind wings aeneous-cinereous. Fore wings with whitish veins and with two whitish oblique lines, which diverge from each other near the interior border ; a transversely elongated black spot including a little longitudinal white streak; two exterior outward-curved white lines, of which the inner one is broader than the other; a few black streaks and speckles; fringe white. Hind wings aeneous-cinereous, with a white aeneous-bordered subinarginal line. Length of the body 3 lines; of the wings 9 lines.

This species is distinctively patterned and coloured.

== Distribution ==
This species is endemic to New Zealand and is found throughout the country. It is regarded as being fairly common.

== Habitat and hosts ==
This species inhabits native forest and can be found at altitudes from sea level up to subalpine. The larvae of this species are assumed to feed on lichen or mosses. Larvae have been observed on lichen covered rocks.

== Behaviour ==
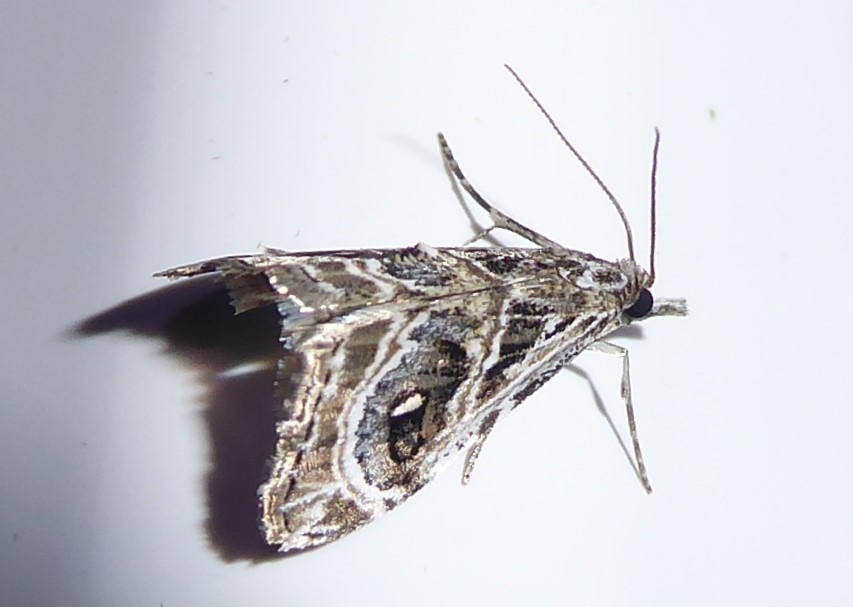
Observation of living Gadira acerella.

The life history of this species is currently unknown. Adults are on the wing from October until March. They are active at night and are attracted to light. This species rests with its wings together over its body in a steep V shape. The adults of the species have frequently been observed resting on lichen covered rocks and fences. Hudson was of the opinion that the raised scales and colouring on the forewing caused an at rest adult to resemble a bird dropping. It has also been suggested the raised scales and colouring on the forewing are disruptive and ensures the adult moth blends in with lichens upon which the moth prefers to rest.
