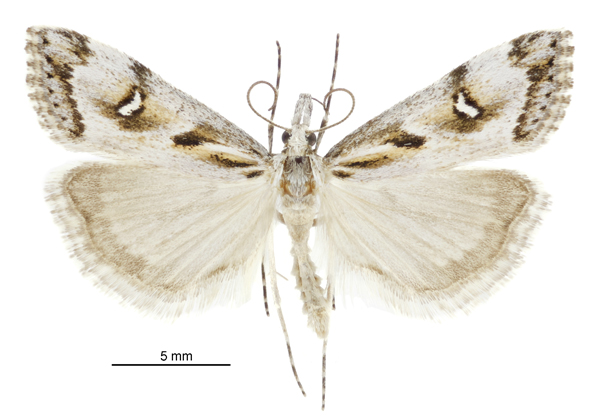
- Male

Conservation status
- Nationally Vulnerable (NZ TCS)

Scientific classification
- Kingdom: Animalia
- Phylum: Arthropoda
- Clade: Pancrustacea
- Class: Insecta
- Order: Lepidoptera
- Family: Crambidae
- Subfamily: Crambinae
- Tribe: Chiloini
- Genus: Gadira
- Species: G. leucophthalma

Binomial name
- Gadira leucophthalma (Meyrick, 1882)

Synonyms
- Thinasotia leucophthalma Meyrick, 1882; Thisasotia leucophthalma (Meyrick, 1882); Talis leucophthalma (Meyrick, 1882)

= Gadira leucophthalma =

Species of moth

Gadira leucophthalma, the beaked moss moth, is a moth in the family Crambidae. It is endemic to New Zealand. It is found in the south eastern side of the South Island down to Banks Peninsula. G. leucophthalma inhabits the foredunes of coastal areas. The larval host is unknown but it has been hypothesised that the larvae feed on moss. The adult moths are day flying although some specimens have been trapped at night via light traps. Adults are commonly on the wing from March to April. This species has been classified as Nationally Vulnerable by the Department of Conservation.

== Taxonomy ==
This species was first described by Edward Meyrick in 1882 from specimens collected in the Port Hills near Lyttelton and named Thinasotia leucophthalma. Thinasotia was a misspelling by Meyrick of the genus Thisanotia. Meyrick gave a more detailed description of the species in 1883. In 1895 George Hampson placed this species within the genus Talis. This placement was followed by Meyrick in 1913, George Vernon Hudson in 1928, and in 1930 by Alfred Philpott, who studied the male genitalia of the species. In 1973 David E. Gaskin assigned the species to the genus Gadira. The lectotype specimen of this moth is held at the Natural History Museum, London.

== Description ==
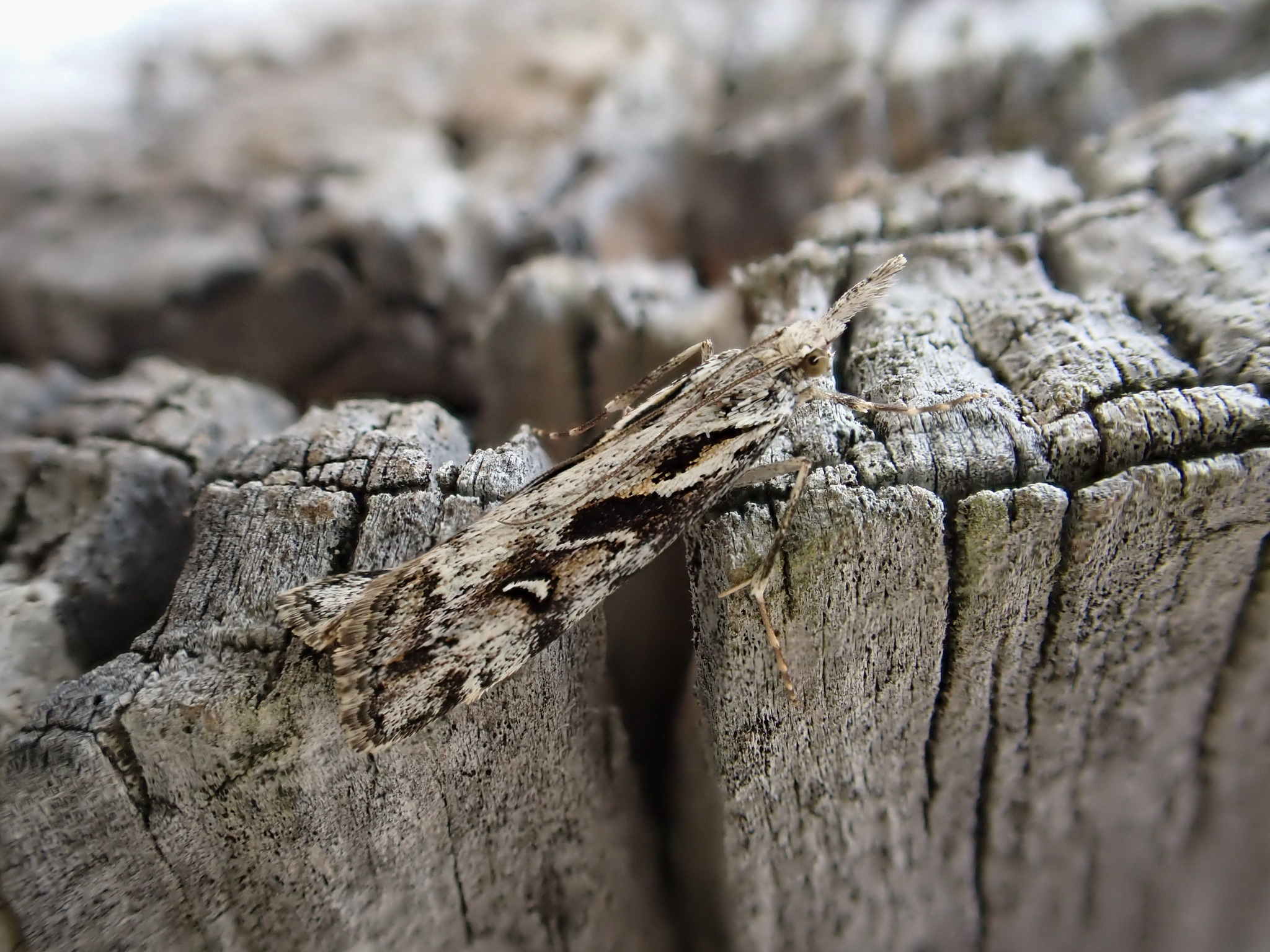
Gadira leucophthalma observed by Dr Robert Hoare.

Meyrick described this species as follows:

Male, female. — 19-23 mm. Head light greyish-ochreous, sometimes fuscous-tinged. Palpi light greyish-ochreous, strongly mixed with blackish-fuscous, labial palpi very long. Antennae greyish-fuscous. Thorax light greyish-ochreous, more or less strongly mixed with blackish-fuscous. Abdomen whitish-ochreous, suffusedly irrorated with dark fuscous. Legs whitish-ochreous, irrorated with dark fuscous; anterior and middle tibiae and tarsi suffused with blackish except at apex of joints, posterior tarsi dark fuscous towards base of joints. Forewings moderately broad, triangular, costa very slightly arched, somewhat bent before apex, apex obtusely pointed, hindmargin moderately oblique, rather strongly sinuate below apex; ochreous-whitish, when fresh slightly pinkish or purplish-tinged, thickly and coarsely irrorated with dark fuscous, towards inner margin slightly more ochreous-tinged, and towards disc more or less strongly suffused with light ochreous-fuscous; a small irregular black spot on inner margin almost at base, and a similar one below costa almost at base; an irregular sinuate longitudinal black streak, attenuated at extremities, extending almost from base along submedian fold to 1/3 from base; an elongate-ovate black spot in disc rather above and beyond posterior extremity of the sinuate streak, anterior end rather acute; a rather ill-defined dark fuscous transverse line, preceded by a pale line, from costa at 2/5 to middle of inner margin, most distinct on costal half, twice dentate beneath costa, bent round posterior extremity of the black spot, and again twice dentate above inner margin; a short suffused inwardly oblique dark fuscous mark on costa beyond middle; a sharply-defined obliquely transverse elongate white black-margined spot in disc at 3/5, upper part slightly greyish-tinged; a double indistinctly dentate dark fuscous transverse line, enclosing a pale line, from about 4/5 of costa to inner margin a little before anal angle, upper third rather inwardly oblique, lower two-thirds strongly outwards-curved, forming indistinct spots on costa and in middle : cilia ochreous-whitish, with two ill-defined dark grey lines. Hindwings whitish-fuscous-grey, with an indistinct darker band along hindmargin, not extending to anal angle, closely preceded by an indistinct suffused dark line; cilia ochreous-whitish, with a broad fuscous-grey line near base, and a much fainter one posteriorly.

This species is visually very similar to Gadira petraula but it can be distinguished as G. leucophthalma is slightly larger and the edges of its forewings are more lightly coloured. Both G. leucophthalma male and females have variable colour patternation on their wings. The females have variable wing length.

== Distribution ==
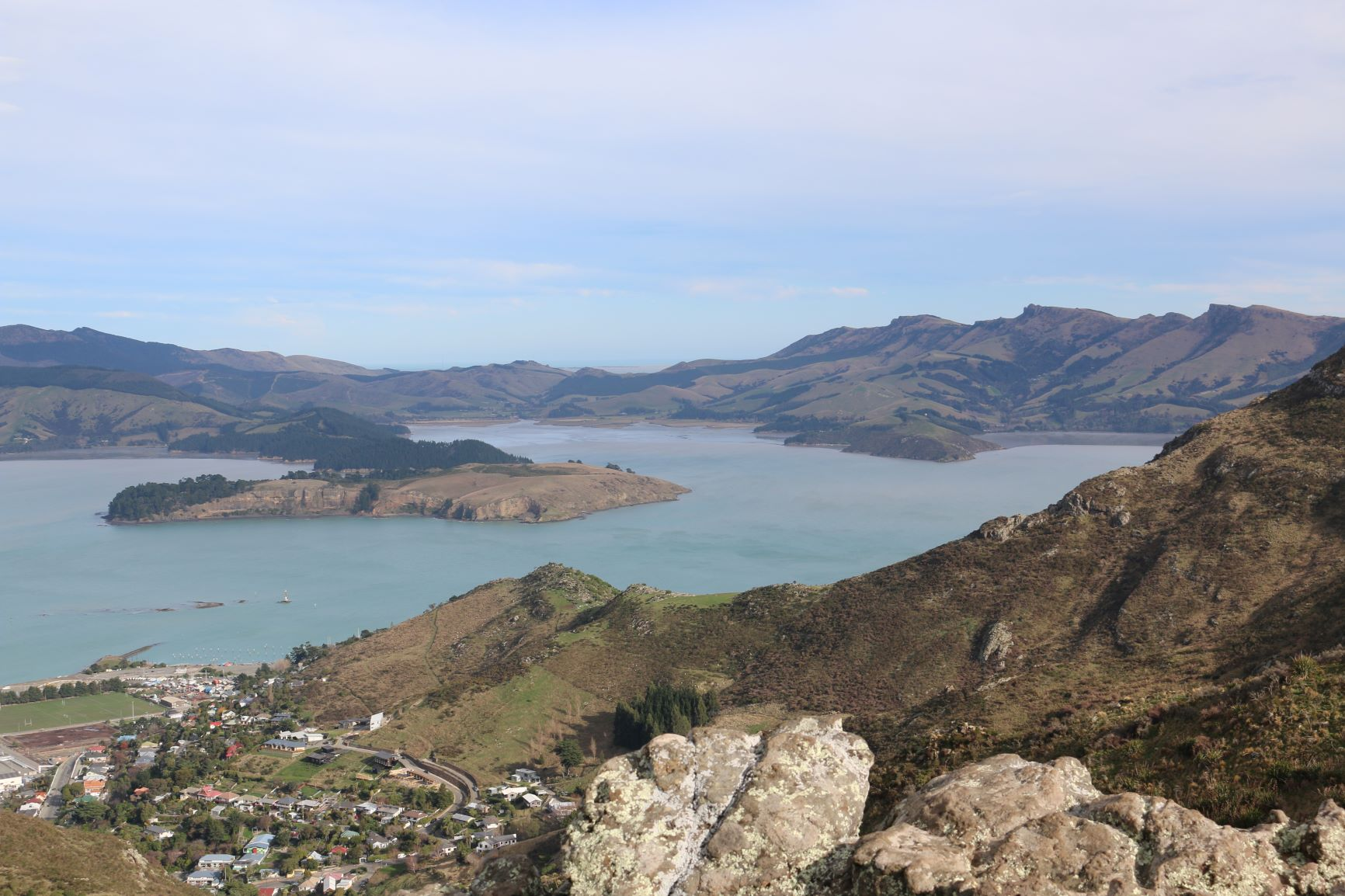
Lyttelton hills, type locality of G. leucophthalma.

G. leucophthalma is endemic to New Zealand. It is found south eastern side in the South Island on the Along with its type location of Lyttelton hills, this species has also been collected on Mount Gray, on Kaitorete Spit, and on Banks Peninsula, all in Canterbury. G. leucophthalma is also recorded as being present at Cloudy Bay.

== Biology and behaviour ==
Meyrick originally collected adults of the species in March but subsequently took it in December. Specimens have also been collected in November. However it is more commonly seen from March to April. The species is a day flying moth although some specimens have been trapped at night with UV light.

== Habitat ==
G. leucophthalma prefers to inhabit foredunes. The species has also been found to inhabit areas of bristle-grass with moss present.

== Host plants ==
The host plants of this species is unknown although it has been hypothesised that the larvae feed on moss.

== Conservation status ==
This species has the "Nationally Vulnerable" conservation status under the New Zealand Threat Classification System.
