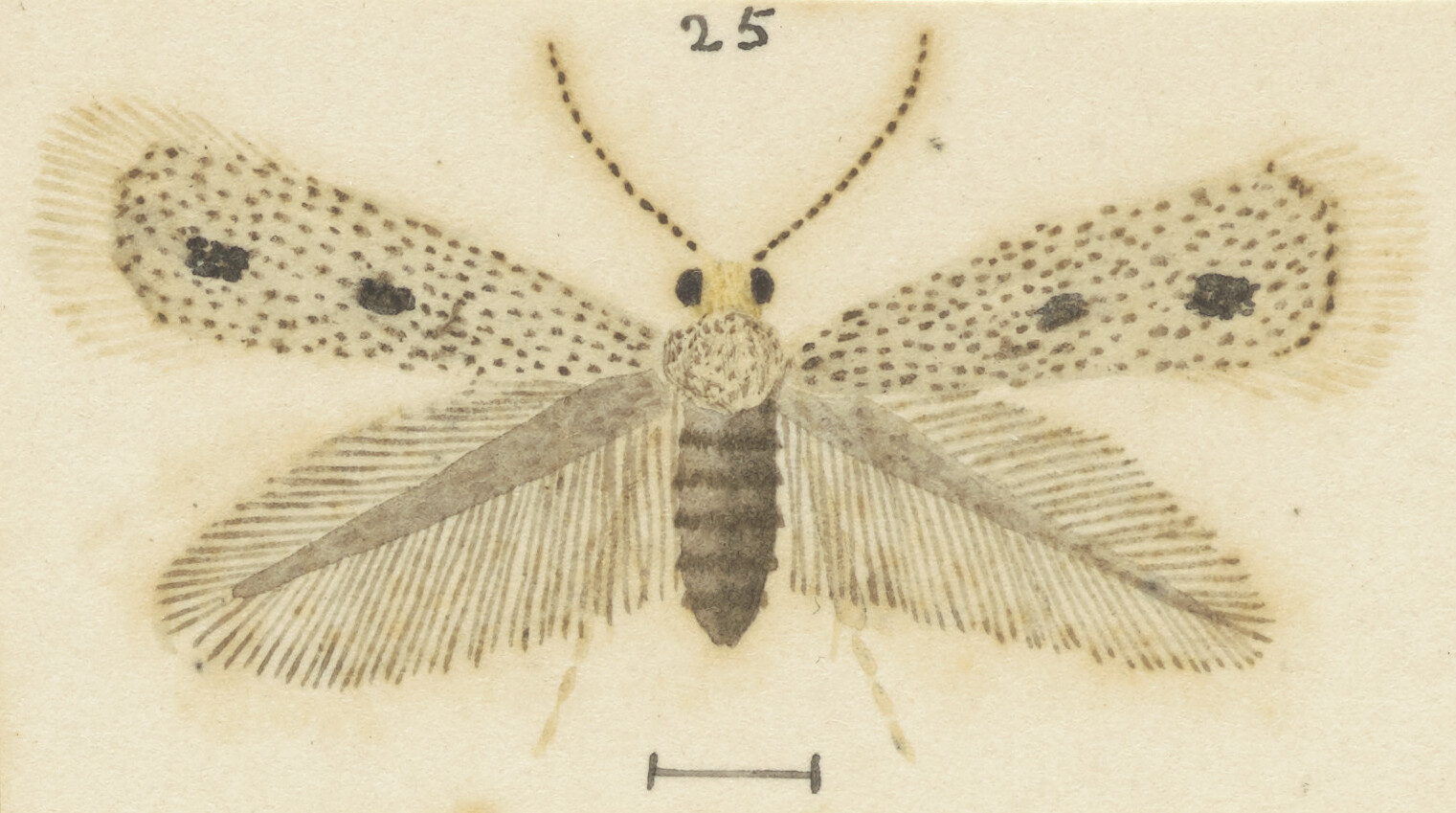
- Illustration of female

Scientific classification
- Kingdom: Animalia
- Phylum: Arthropoda
- Class: Insecta
- Order: Lepidoptera
- Family: Nepticulidae
- Genus: Stigmella
- Species: S. sophorae

Binomial name
- Stigmella sophorae (Hudson, 1939)

Synonyms
- Nepticula sophorae Hudson, 1939

= Stigmella sophorae =

Species of moth endemic to New Zealand

Stigmella sophorae is a moth of the family Nepticulidae. This species was first described by George Hudson in 1939. It is endemic to New Zealand and is found in the North and South Islands. Larvae are leaf miners and feed on Sophora tetraptera and Sophora microphylla. Larvae have been observed from April to August. Adults have been seen on the wing in February and from August to December. There is one generation per year.

== Taxonomy ==
This species was first described by George Hudson in 1939 and named Nepticula sophorae. In 1988 John S. Dugdale placed this species in the genus Stigmella. In 1989 Hans Donner and Christopher Wilkinson agreed with this placement in their monograph on New Zealand Nepticulidae. This placement was again confirmed in a 2016 revision of the global species placed in the family Nepticulidae. The holotype specimen, collected by Morris N. Watt on "Kowhai" in Christchurch, is held at Te Papa.

== Description ==
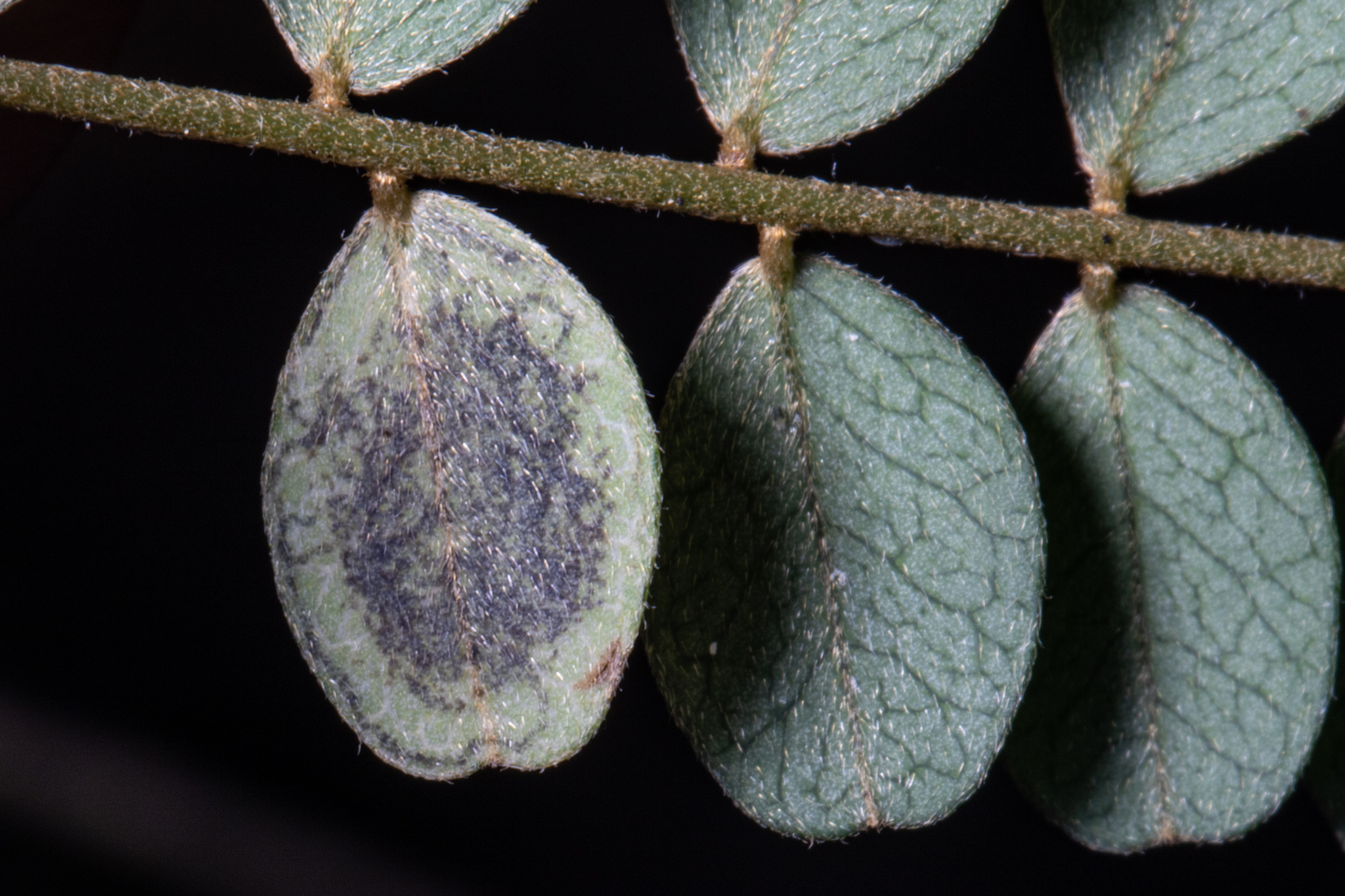
Mine of S. sophorae larva.

Larvae are 2–3 mm long and are pale green.

The cocoon is made of pale brown silk and attaches to the stem of the host plant.

Hudson described the adults of this species as follows:

The expansion of the wings is under 1/4 inch (5 1/2 mm.). The fore-wings are very pale whitish-ochreous, densely speckled with very small black dots; there is a black spot in the disc below and before middle and another at about 3/4; the cilia are pale whitishochreous. Hind-wings and cilia grey.

Donner and Wilkinson described the adult male and female of the species as follows:

Head. Frontal tuft, scape, and collar cream; antenna grey, lustrous, reflecting silver, comprising 19-23 segments. Thorax creamish white. Forewing about 3 mm long, speckled white and brown, with 2 small black spots, one medial and one subterminal; each scale cream at base, pale brown at margin; fringe silvery white. Hindwing silvery grey; fringe long, concolorous. Abdomen pale grey.

S. sophorae is a very small moth and can be distinguished from S. cassiniae as its forewings are much paler in colour.

== Distribution ==
This species is endemic to New Zealand. It has been observed in both the North and South Islands.

== Habitat and hosts ==
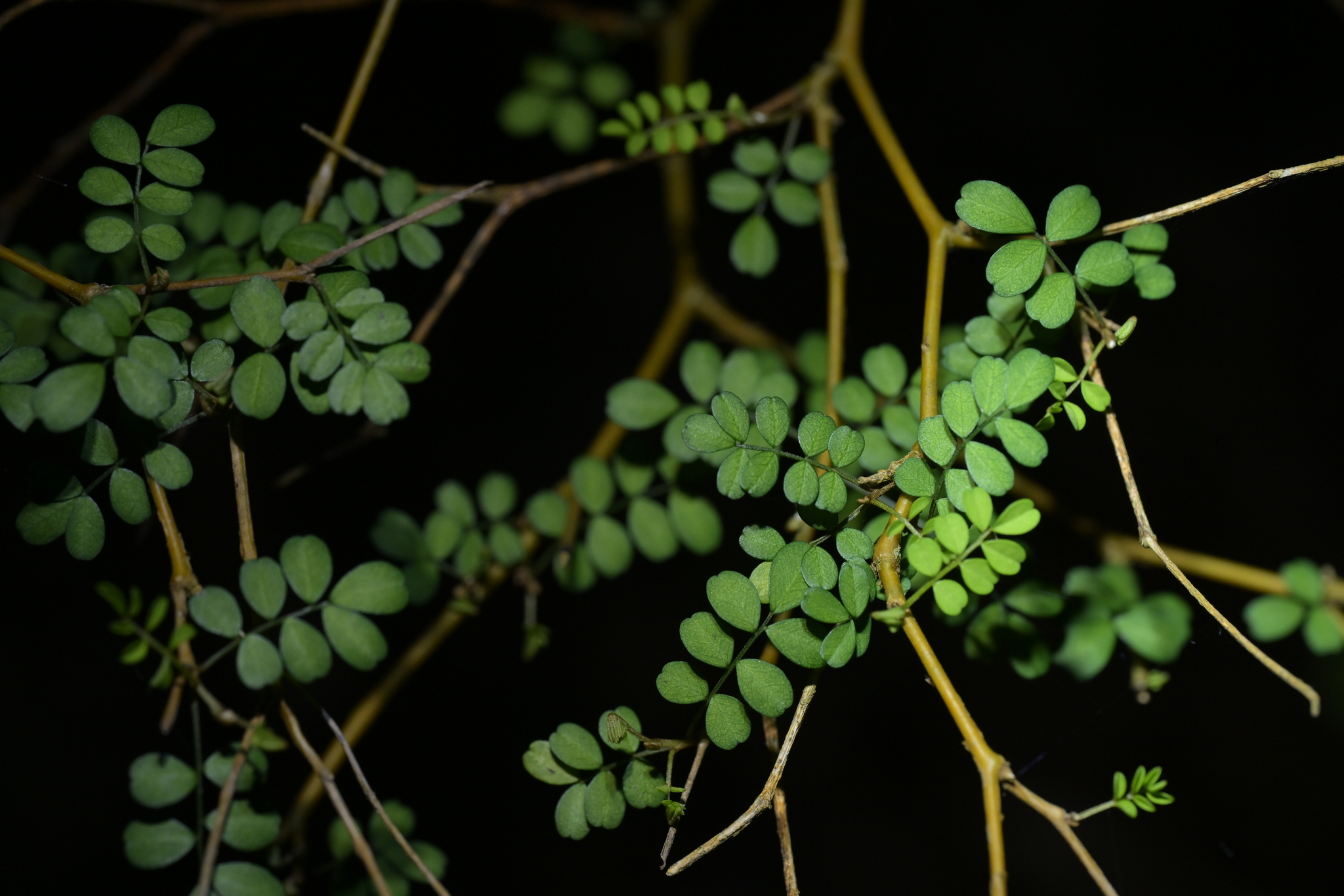
Leaves of the larval host Sophora microphylla.

The larvae feed on Sophora tetraptera and Sophora microphylla. They mine the leaves of their host plant. The mine begins with random squiggles and later fills all space between the layer protecting the outermost skin layer. There is one mine per leaf, but often adjacent leaves also have mines. The frass starts as a green shade, but gradually turns grey. Immature mines are paler green than the leaf they are found in.

== Behaviour ==
Larva have been recorded from April to August. Adults have been recorded in February and from August to December. There is one generation per year.
