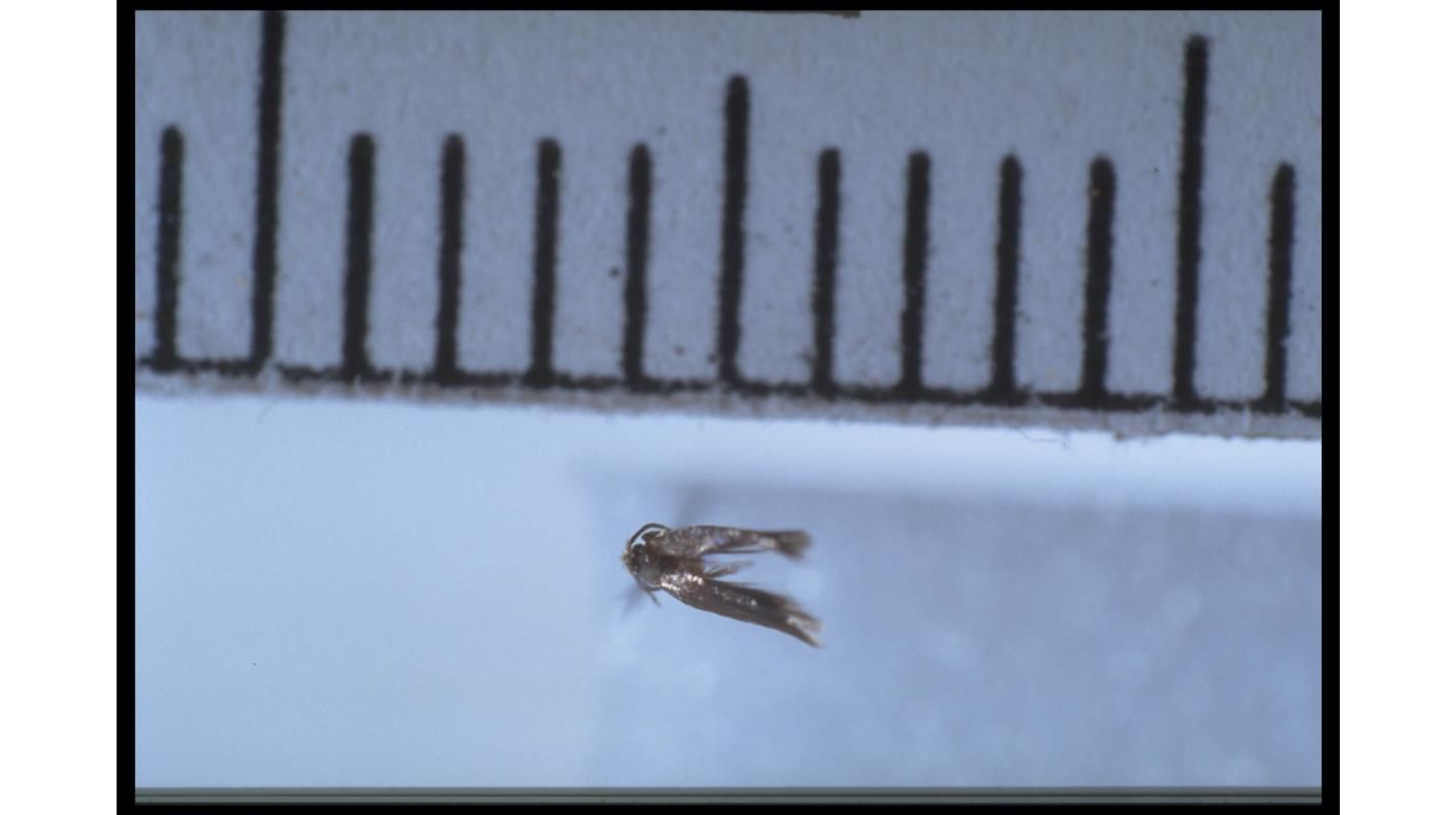
- Male holotype

Scientific classification
- Kingdom: Animalia
- Phylum: Arthropoda
- Clade: Pancrustacea
- Class: Insecta
- Order: Lepidoptera
- Family: Nepticulidae
- Genus: Stigmella
- Species: S. cassiniae

Binomial name
- Stigmella cassiniae Donner & Wilkinson, 1989

= Stigmella cassiniae =

Species of moth endemic to New Zealand

Stigmella cassiniae is a moth of the family Nepticulidae. It is endemic to New Zealand and has been observed in the North and South Islands. The larvae are leaf miners of leaves and stems of Ozothamnus leptophyllus. When mature, the larvae pupate amongst leaf litter on the ground. Adult moths have been recorded on the wing in January, February, April, and October. It has been hypothesised that there are likely two generations in a year.

== Taxonomy ==
This species was first described in 1989 by Hans Donner and Christopher Wilkinson from specimens collected in the Gisborne, Hawkes Bay, Taranaki and Southland regions. The male holotype specimen, collected at Cheviot Face in the Takitimu Range on 30 January 1976 on Cassinia vauvilliersii (now known as Ozothamnus leptophyllus) by J. S. Dugdale, is held in the New Zealand Arthropod Collection.

== Description ==
Larvae are 2–3 mm long and orange-brown. Adult moths have forewings with a length of between 2–3 mm. Donner and Wilkinson described the adult male of this species as follows:

Head. Frontal tuft buff; scape and collar pale grey to whitish; antenna brown, lustrous, reflecting gold, comprising 29 segments. Thorax grey. Forewing 2–3 mm long, golden brown, iridescent, reflecting gold and silver; fringe concolorous. Hindwing silvery grey, lustrous, reflecting silver; fringe silvery white. Abdomen concolorous.

Donner and Wilkinson went on to described the adult female as follows:

As for male, but antenna comprising 22 segments.

This species is easily identified by its small size and its forewing colouration of golden brown.

== Distribution ==
This species is endemic to New Zealand and has been observed in the North and South Islands. The species has been observed at Mt. Benger at an altitude of 1,100 metres (3,600 ft).

== Host ==
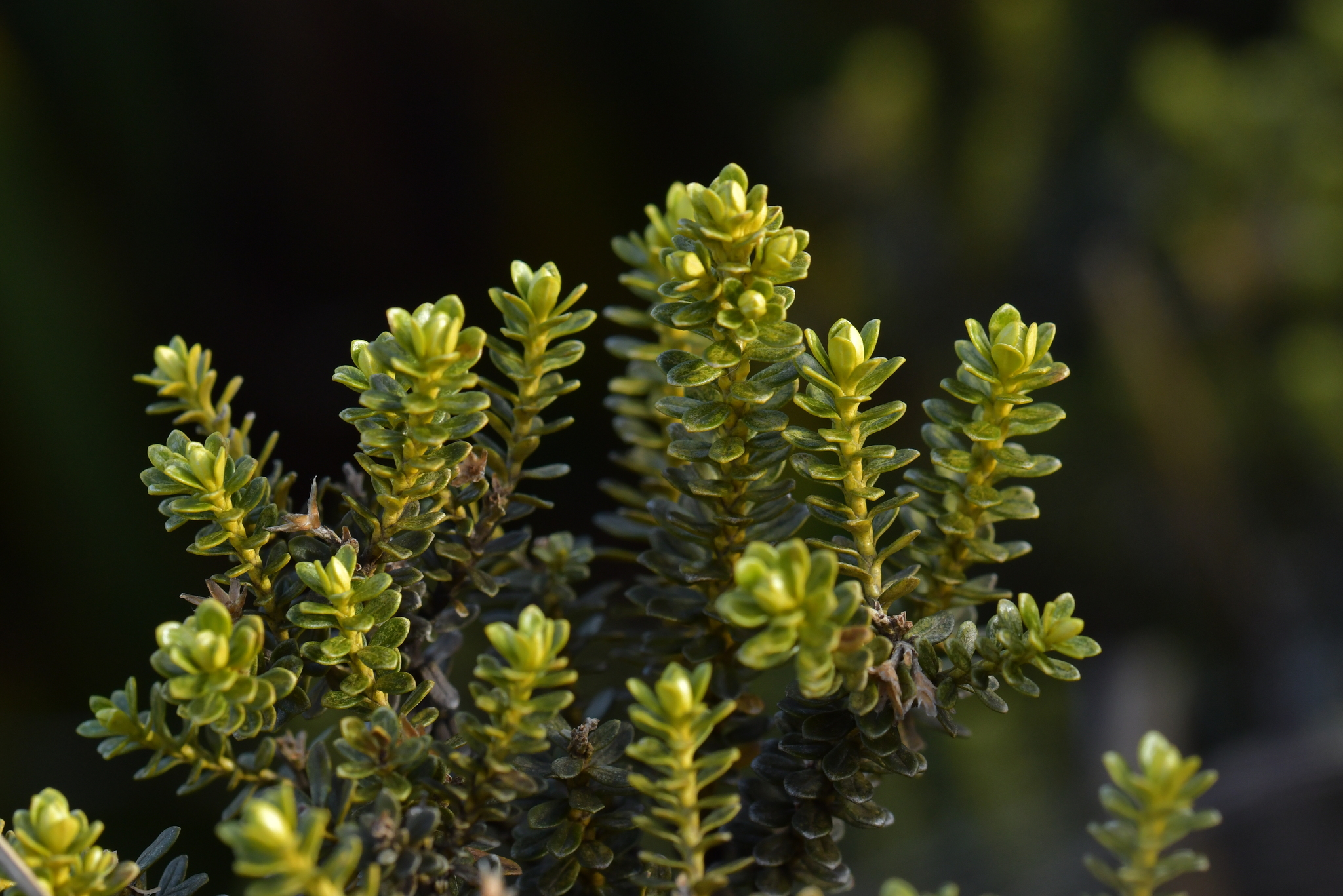
Host species O. leptophyllus.

The larvae feed on Ozothamnus leptophyllus.
