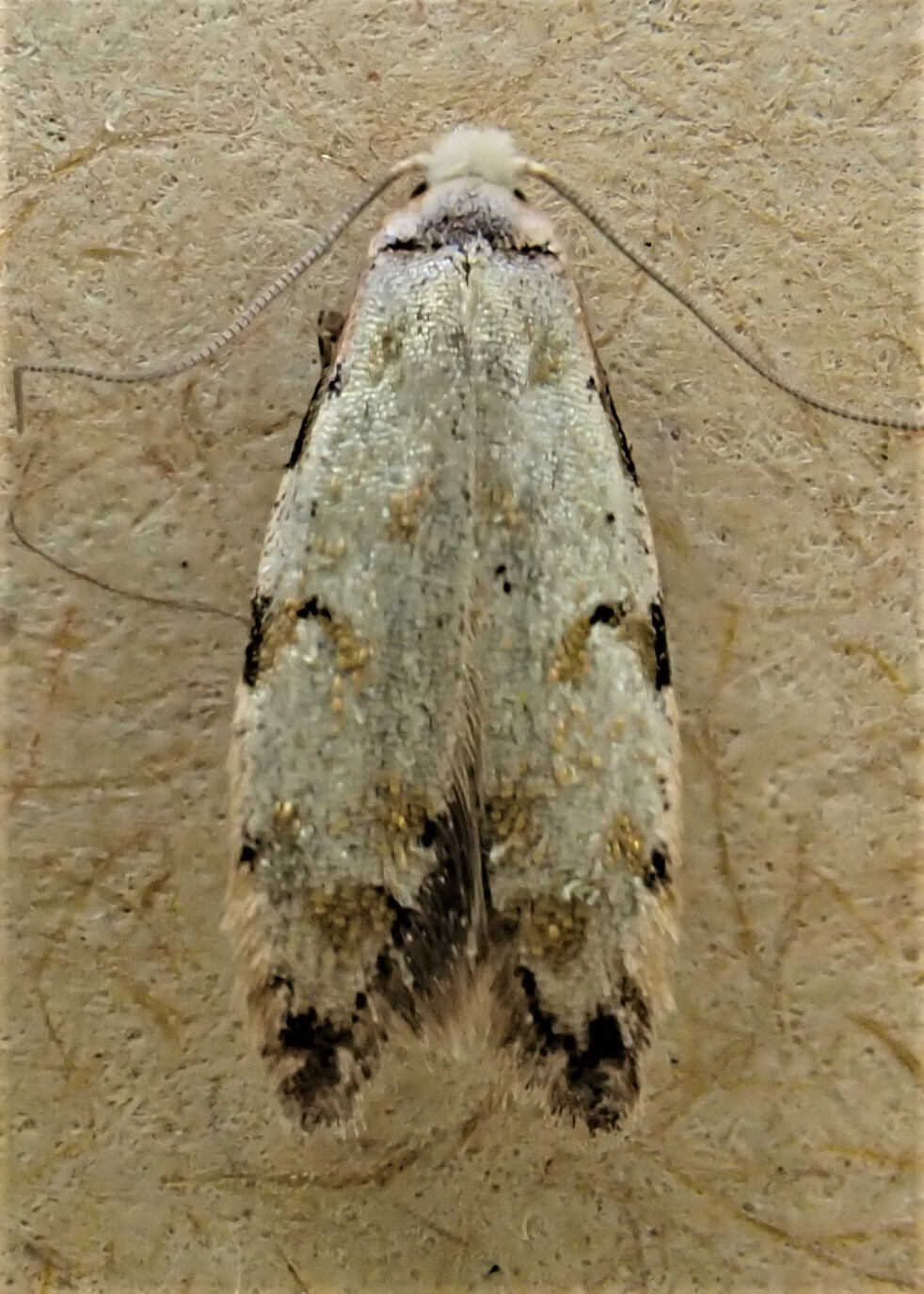

Scientific classification
- Kingdom: Animalia
- Phylum: Arthropoda
- Class: Insecta
- Order: Lepidoptera
- Family: Tineidae
- Genus: Endophthora
- Species: E. pallacopis

Binomial name
- Endophthora pallacopis Meyrick, 1918

= Endophthora pallacopis =

Species of moth

Endophthora pallacopis is a species of moth in the family Tineidae. It was described by Edward Meyrick in 1918. This species is endemic to New Zealand.
