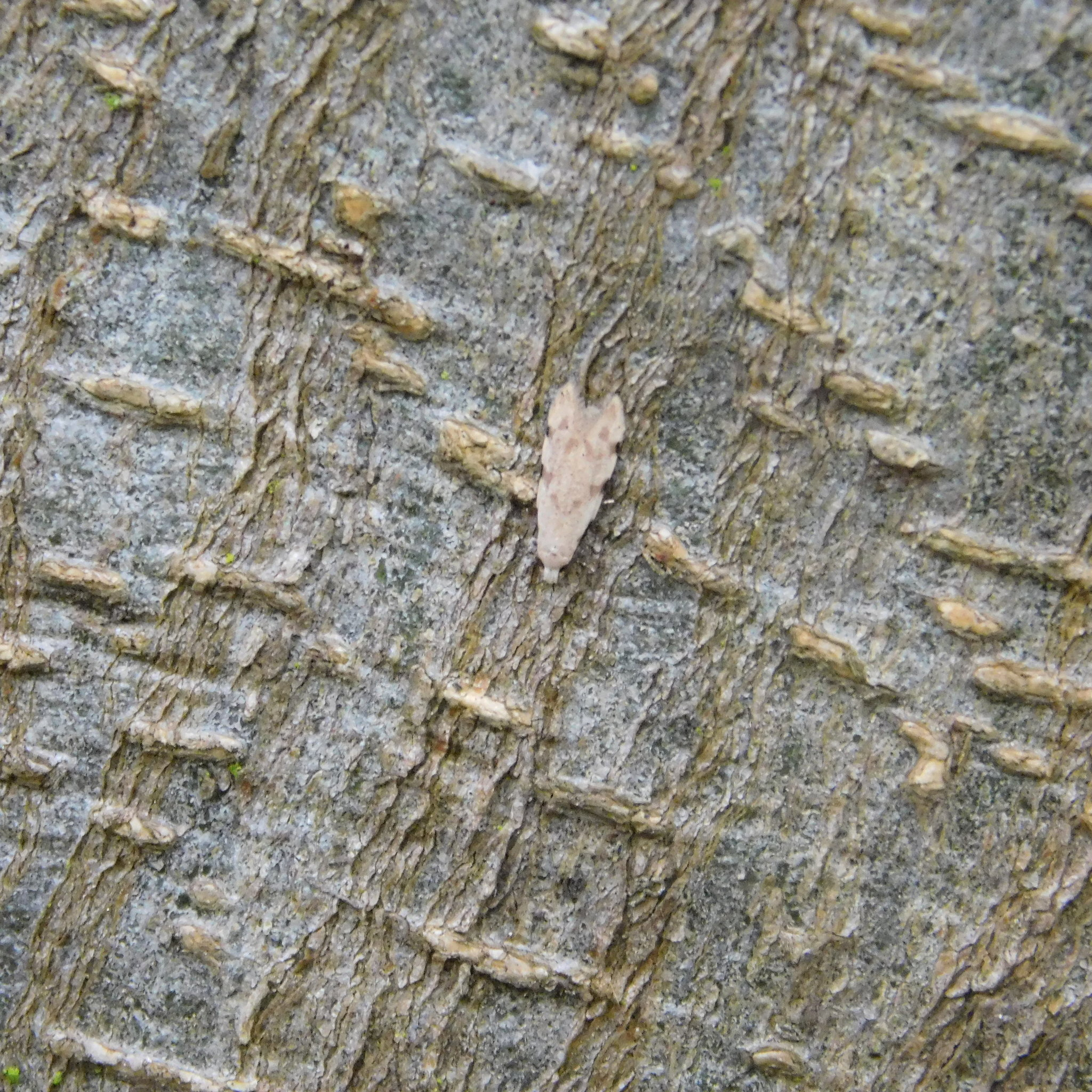
- Endophthora omogramma

Scientific classification
- Kingdom: Animalia
- Phylum: Arthropoda
- Clade: Pancrustacea
- Class: Insecta
- Order: Lepidoptera
- Family: Tineidae
- Genus: Endophthora; Meyrick, 1888

= Endophthora =

Genus of moths

Endophthora is a genus of moths belonging to the family Tineidae. This genus is endemic to New Zealand.

== Species ==
- Endophthora omogramma Meyrick, 1888
- Endophthora pallacopis Meyrick, 1918
- Endophthora rubiginella Hudson, 1939
- Endophthora tylogramma Meyrick, 1924
