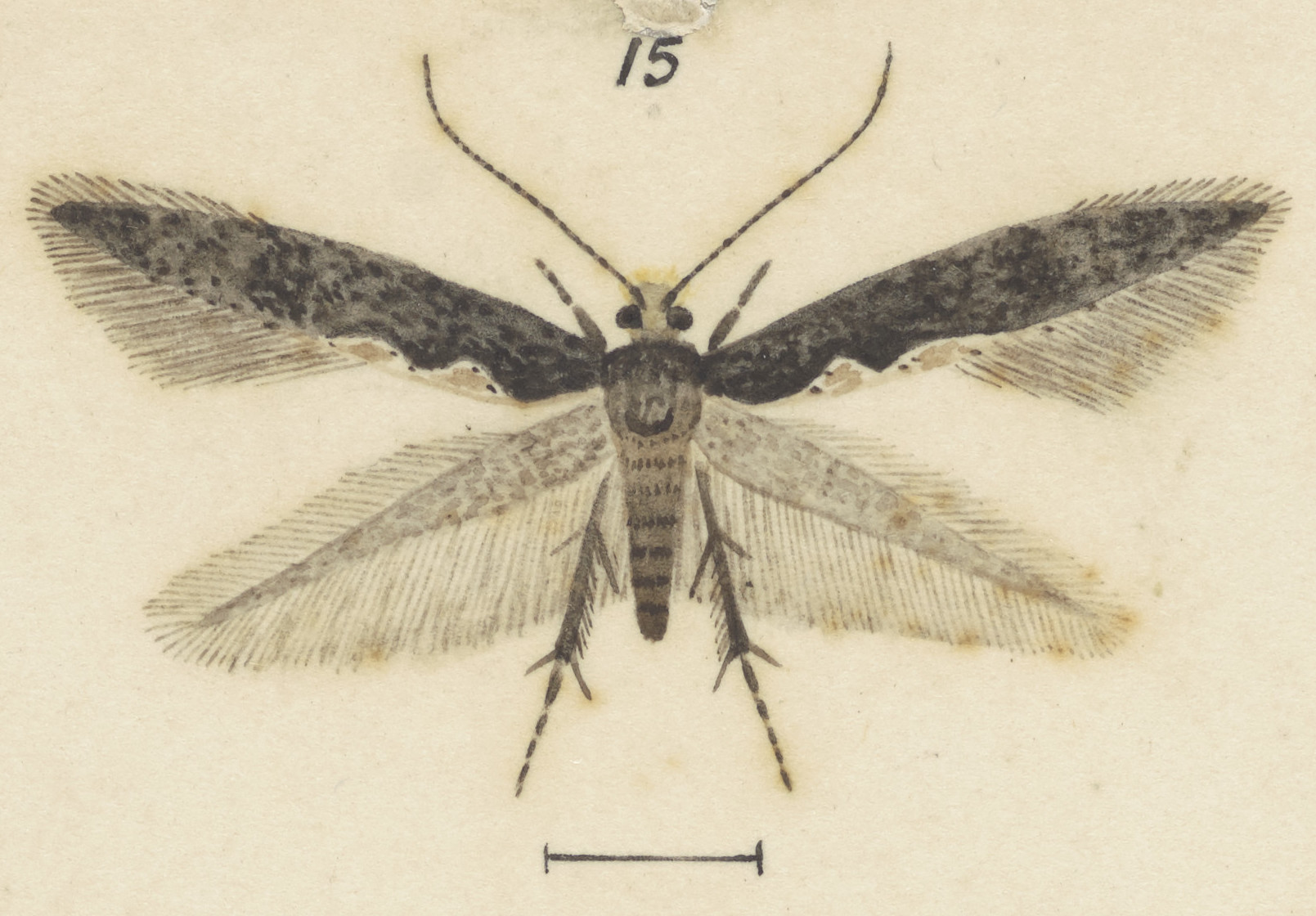

Scientific classification
- Kingdom: Animalia
- Phylum: Arthropoda
- Class: Insecta
- Order: Lepidoptera
- Family: Tineidae
- Genus: Endophthora
- Species: E. tylogramma

Binomial name
- Endophthora tylogramma Meyrick, 1924

= Endophthora tylogramma =

Species of moth

Endophthora tylogramma is a species of moth in the family Tineidae. It was described by Edward Meyrick in 1924. This species is endemic to New Zealand.
