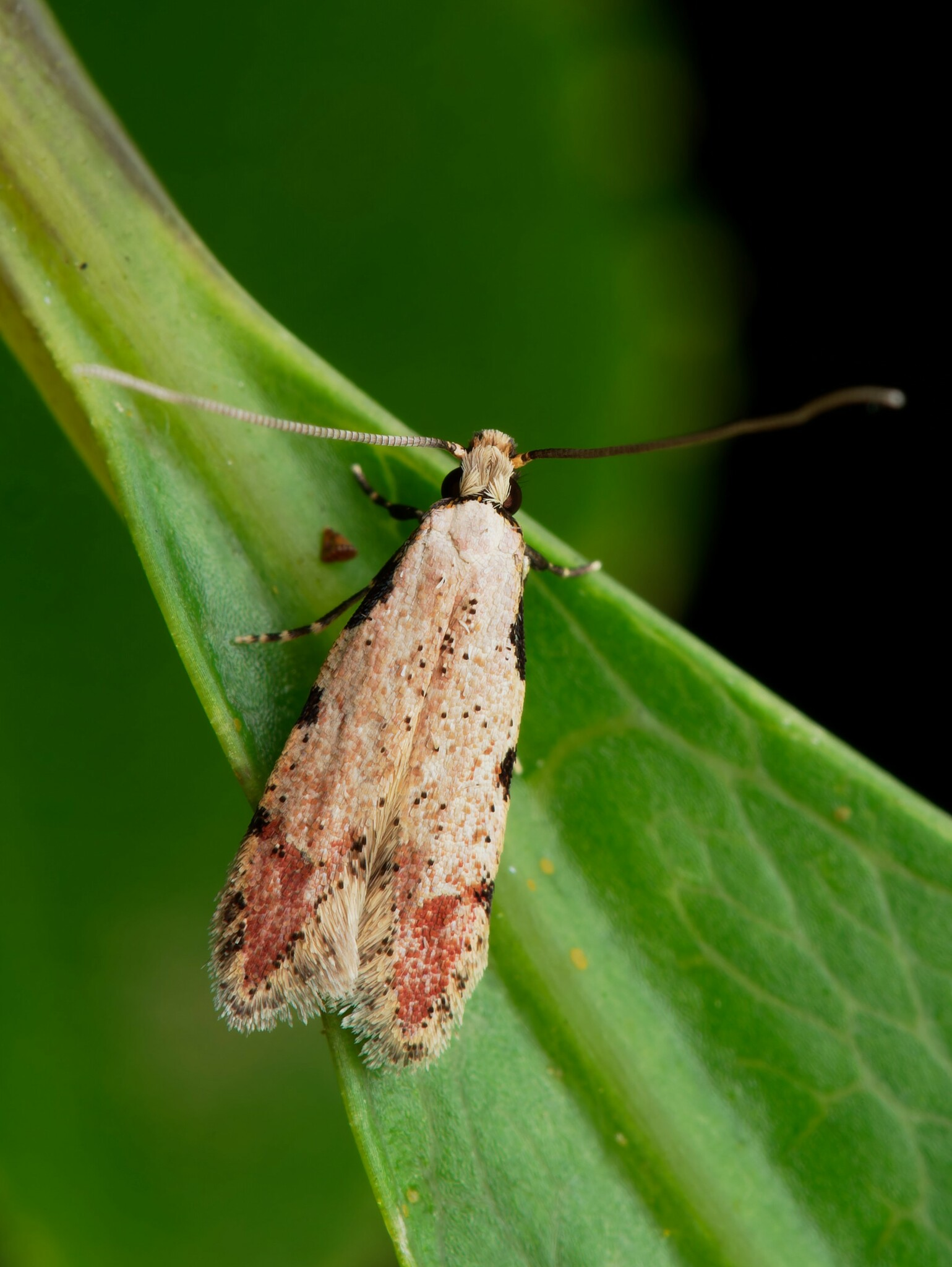

Scientific classification
- Kingdom: Animalia
- Phylum: Arthropoda
- Class: Insecta
- Order: Lepidoptera
- Family: Tineidae
- Genus: Endophthora
- Species: E. rubiginella

Binomial name
- Endophthora rubiginella Hudson, 1939

= Endophthora rubiginella =

Species of moth

Endophthora rubiginella is a species of moth in the family Tineidae. It was described by George Vernon Hudson in 1939. This species is endemic to New Zealand.
