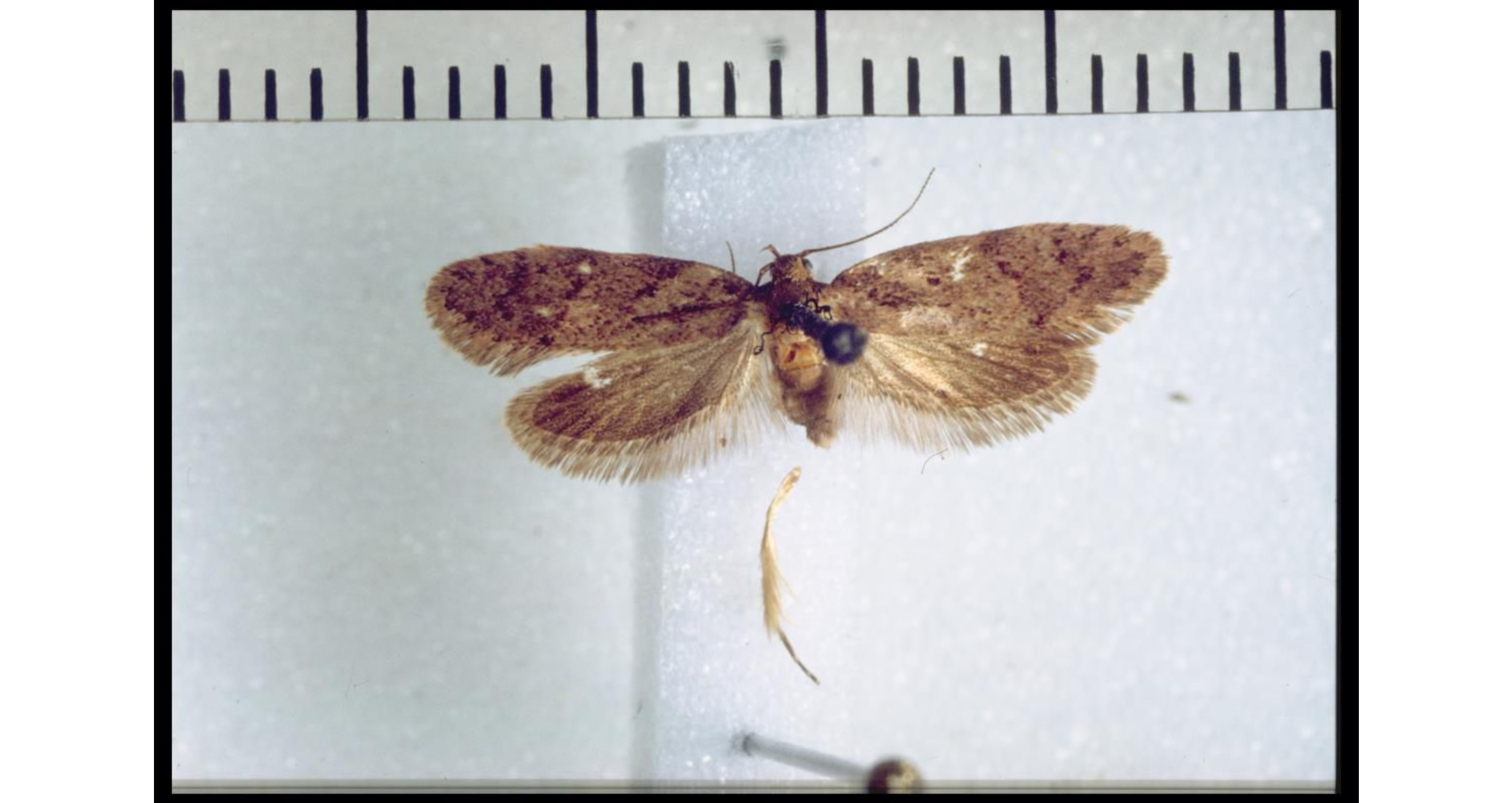

Scientific classification
- Kingdom: Animalia
- Phylum: Arthropoda
- Class: Insecta
- Order: Lepidoptera
- Family: Oecophoridae
- Genus: Euchersadaula
- Species: E. tristis

Binomial name
- Euchersadaula tristis Philpott, 1926

= Euchersadaula tristis =

Species of moth endemic to New Zealand

Euchersadaula tristis is a moth of the family Oecophoridae. It was first described by Alfred Philpott in 1926. This species is endemic to New Zealand.

== Description ==
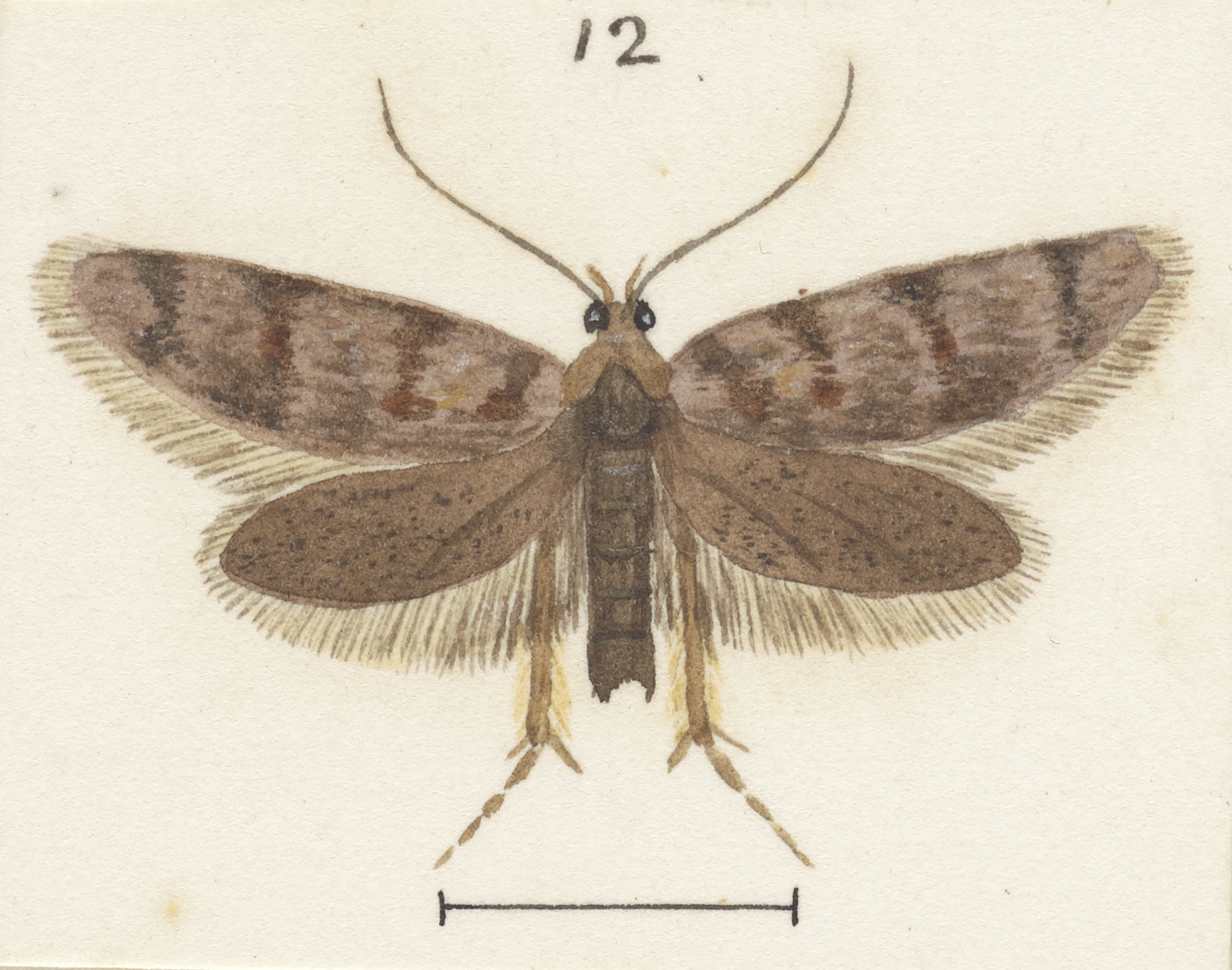
Illustration of E. tristis.

Philpott described this species as follows:

♂. 15–17 mm. Head brownish, tinged with pink. Palpi brown, mixed with whitish within. Antennae brown, ciliations over 1. Thorax bronzy-brown. Abdomen pale bronzy-brown, segmental divisions whitish. Legs bronzy-brown, tarsi annulated with whitish-ochreous. Forewings elongate, costa moderately arched, apex obtuse, termen almost straight, oblique; bronzy-brown, strongly tinged with pink, especially on apical half, and with scattered scales and spots of fuscous-black; markings fuscous-black; an obscure striga from costa at ¼, outwardly oblique to fold and enclosing first discal and plical spots; a similar striga from costa beyond middle to tornus, enclosing second discal spot; a faint subterminal striga, sharply angled inwards at middle; some scattered scales and spots; the strigae may be ferruginous, and sometimes there is considerable admixture of whitish-ochreous: fringes leaden-fuscous tinged with pink. Hindwings fuscous, darker apically: fringes greyish-fuscous with darker basal line.

This species is similar in appearance to Euchersadaula lathriopa but can be distinguished from that latter species as E. tristis is larger in size and has broader forewings.
