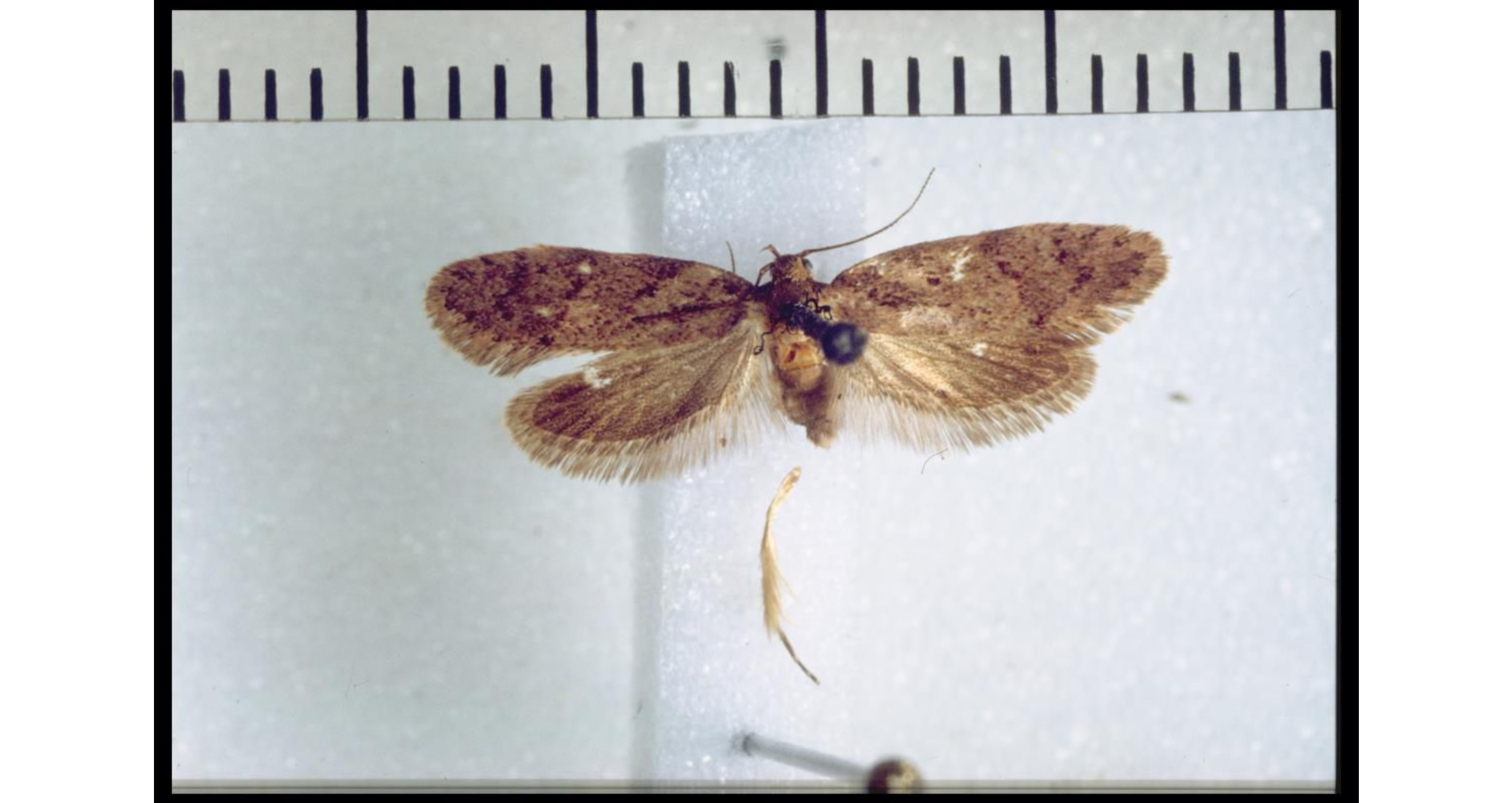
- Holotype of Euchersadaula tristis

Scientific classification
- Domain: Eukaryota
- Kingdom: Animalia
- Phylum: Arthropoda
- Class: Insecta
- Order: Lepidoptera
- Clade: Apoditrysia
- Superfamily: Gelechioidea
- Family: Oecophoridae
- Genus: Euchersadaula; Philpott, 1926

= Euchersadaula =

Genus of moths

Euchersadaula is a genus of moths of the family Oecophoridae. This genus was first described by Alfred Philpott in 1926. The type species of this genus is Trachypepla lathriopa.

== Species ==
This genus contains the following species:

- Euchersadaula lathriopa (Meyrick, 1905)
- Euchersadaula tristis Philpott, 1926
