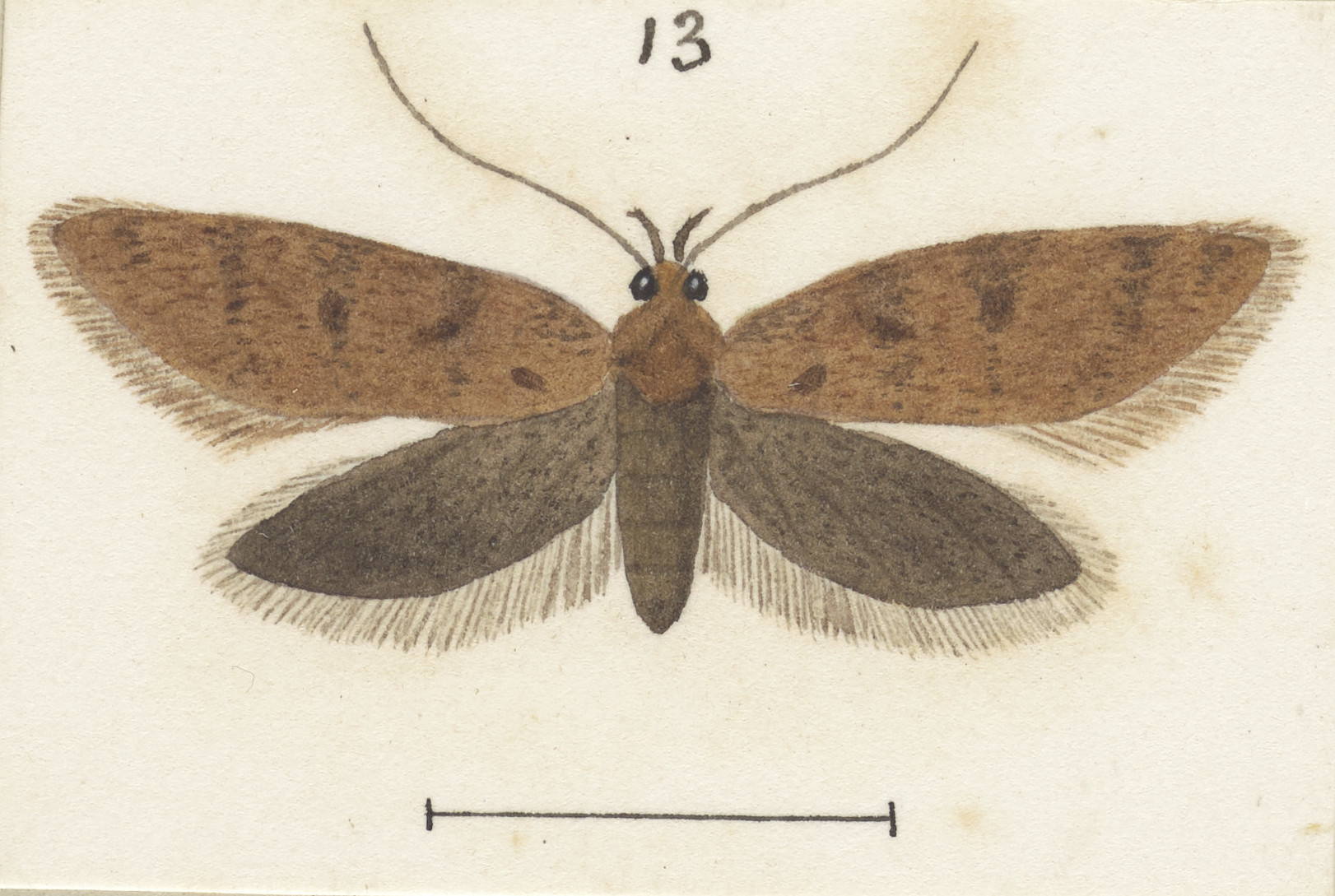

Scientific classification
- Kingdom: Animalia
- Phylum: Arthropoda
- Class: Insecta
- Order: Lepidoptera
- Family: Oecophoridae
- Genus: Euchersadaula
- Species: E. lathriopa

Binomial name
- Euchersadaula lathriopa (Meyrick, 1905)

Synonyms
- Trachypepla lathriopa Meyrick, 1905

= Euchersadaula lathriopa =

Species of moth endemic to New Zealand

Euchersadaula lathriopa is a moth of the family Oecophoridae. It was first described by Edward Meyrick in 1905. This species is endemic to New Zealand.

== Taxonomy ==
This species was first described by Edward Meyrick in 1905 using specimens collected in Wellington, Nelson and the Mount Arthur plateau in January.

== Description ==
Meyrick described this species was described as follows:

♂. 14-16 mm. Head and thorax brown. Palpi brownish-ochreous, sprinkled with dark fuscous, extreme tips of second and terminal joints whitish. Antennae dark fuscous, ciliations 1 1/2, even. Abdomen rather dark fuscous. Fore-wings elongate, costa moderately arched, apex round-pointed, termen very obliquely rounded; light reddish-fuscous, irregularly sprinkled with brown and dark fuscous; edge of basal patch indicated by a very obscure pale acutely angulated narrow fascia; stigmata dark fuscous, very undefined, plical rather obliquely beyond first discal; a subterminal series of undefined dark fuscous dots, indented beneath costa; a series of undefined dark fuscous dots along posterior part of costa and termen : cilia whitish-fuscous, tinged with reddish, with a grey postmedian shade. Hind-wings dark fuscous, lighter towards base; cilia grey, with dark grey basal shade.

== Distribution ==
This species is found throughout the North Island and as far south as Christchurch in the South Island.

== Habitat ==
This species inhabits native forest.

== Behaviour ==
Adult moths are on the wing in January.
