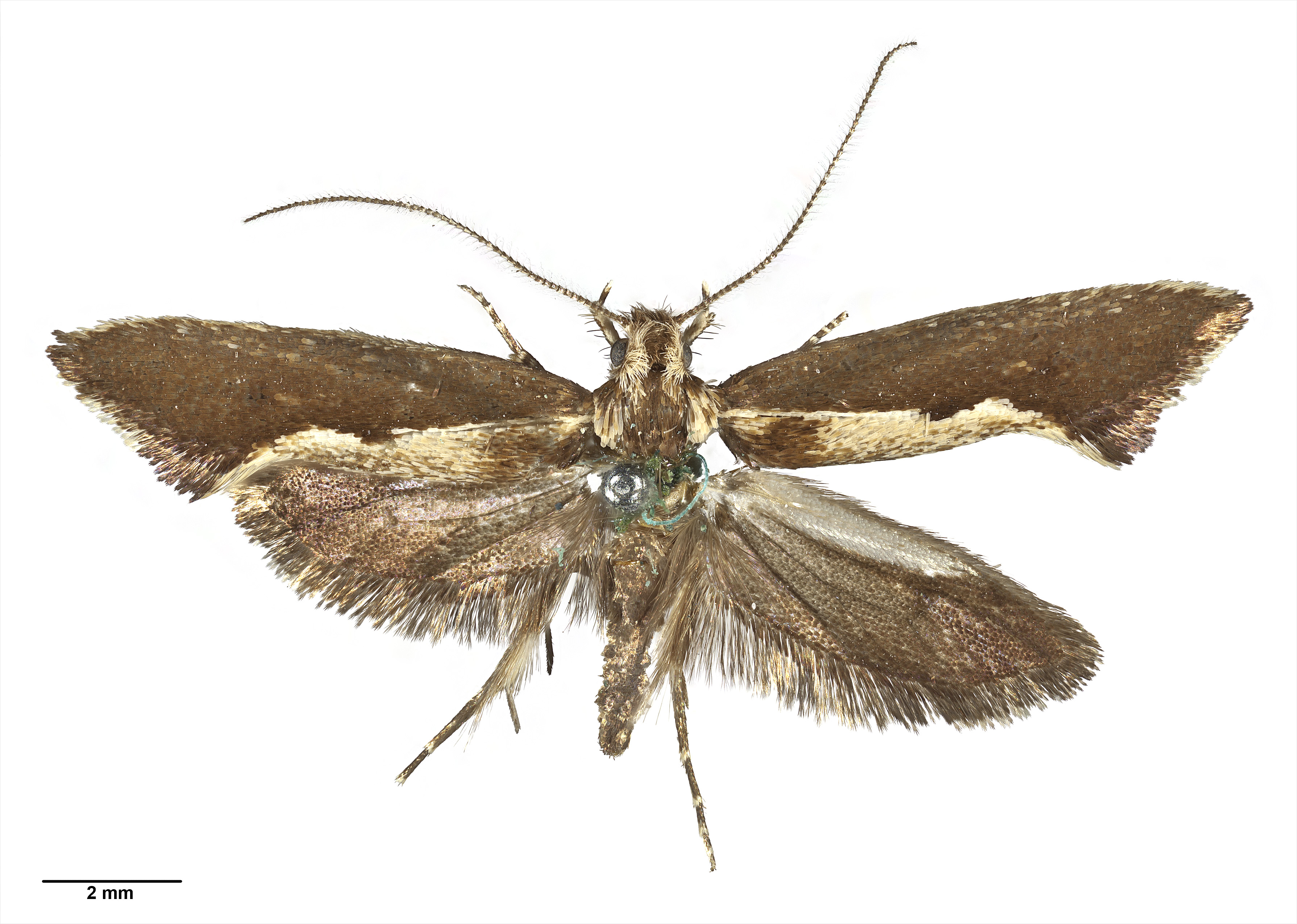

Scientific classification
- Kingdom: Animalia
- Phylum: Arthropoda
- Class: Insecta
- Order: Lepidoptera
- Family: Tineidae
- Genus: Tinea
- Species: T. belonota

Binomial name
- Tinea belonota Meyrick, 1888

Synonyms
- Gymnobathra zephyrana Clarke, 1926

= Tinea belonota =

Species of moth

Tinea belonota is a species of moth in the family Tineidae. It is endemic to New Zealand. It is classified as not threatened by the Department of Conservation.

== Taxonomy ==
It was described by Edward Meyrick in 1888 using a specimen collected in Palmerston North in March. This holotype specimen has not been found at the Natural History Museum, London. In 1926 Charles E. Clarke, thinking he was describing a new species, gave this moth the name Gymnobathra zephyrana. Alfred Philpott synonymised this name in 1931. The specimen Clarke used for this description was collected in Whangārei and is now held at the Auckland War Memorial Museum. The placement of this species within the genus Tinea is in doubt. As a result, this species is also known as Tinea (s.l.) belonota.

== Description ==
Meyrick described this species as follows:

Male. — 13 mm. Head whitish-fuscous. Palpi fuscous, base and apex ochreous-whitish. Antennae, thorax, and abdomen fuscous; antennal ciliations 3. Legs dark fuscous, apex of joints ochreous-whitish. Forewings elongate, moderate, costa gently arched, apex rouud-pointed, hindmargin straight, very oblique; rather dark fuscous; a tolerably well-defined ochreous-whitish streak along fold from base to anal angle, upper margin with a slight projection before and a stronger one beyond middle, between which is a small dark fuscous spot : cilia rather dark fuscous, purple- shining, tips beneath apex and a small spot beneath anal angle ochreous-whitish. Hindwings with veins 5 and 6 separate; rather dark fuscous, purple-shining, lighter and thinly scaled towards base; cilia fuscous.

This species is visually similar to Trithamnora certella and Tinea mochlota but can be distinguished as T. belonota has broader wings, lacks discal spots, has a more obvious pale streak, and different cilia.

== Distribution ==
This species is endemic to New Zealand. It has been collected in Palmerston North, Whangarei and at Okauia in the Waikato.

== Conservation status ==
This species has been classified as being "not threatened" under the New Zealand Threat Classification System.
