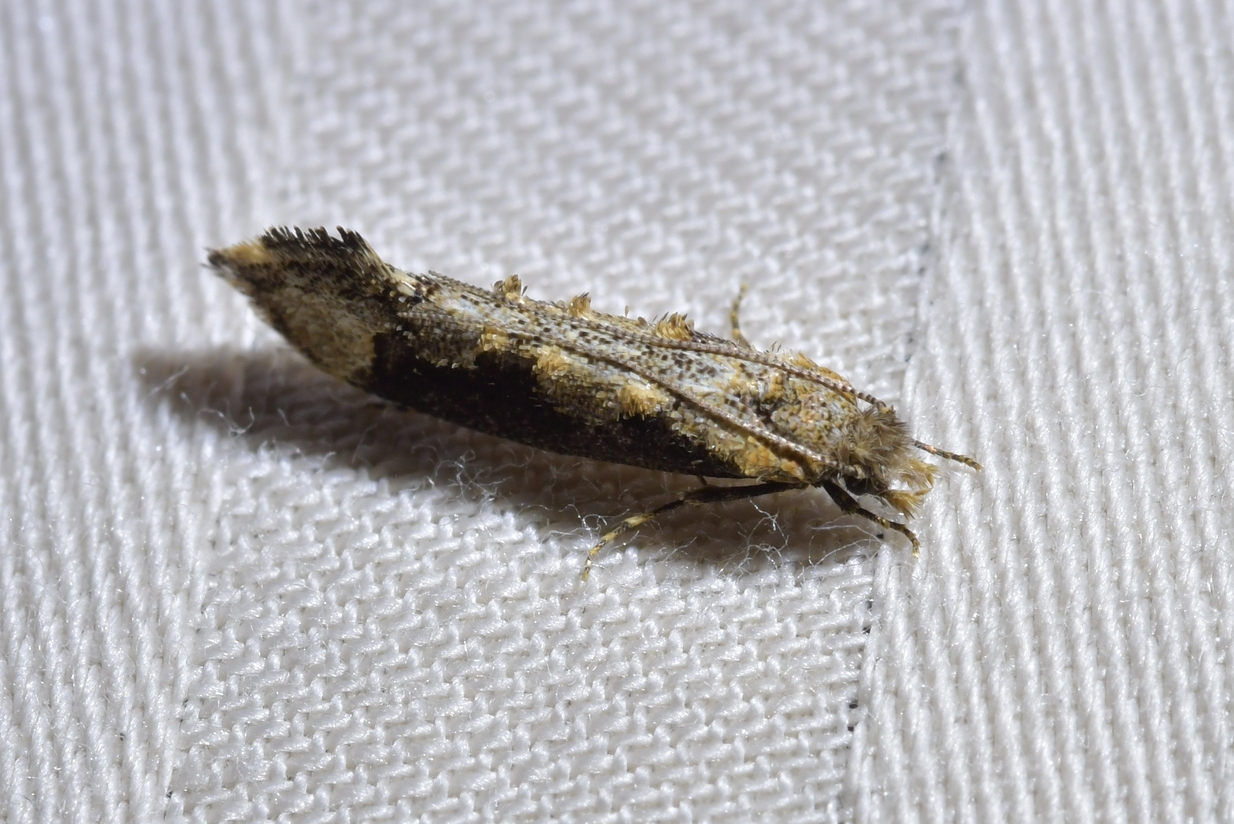

Scientific classification
- Kingdom: Animalia
- Phylum: Arthropoda
- Clade: Pancrustacea
- Class: Insecta
- Order: Lepidoptera
- Family: Tineidae
- Genus: Trithamnora; Meyrick, 1913
- Species: T. certella

Binomial name
- Trithamnora certella (Walker, 1863)

Synonyms
- Tinea certella Walker, 1863; Trithamnora improba Meyrick, 1913

= Trithamnora =

Genus of moths

Trithamnora is a genus of moths belonging to the family Tineidae. It contains only one species, Trithamnora certella, which is found in New Zealand.

The wingspan is about 16 mm. The forewings are pinkish grey and white.
