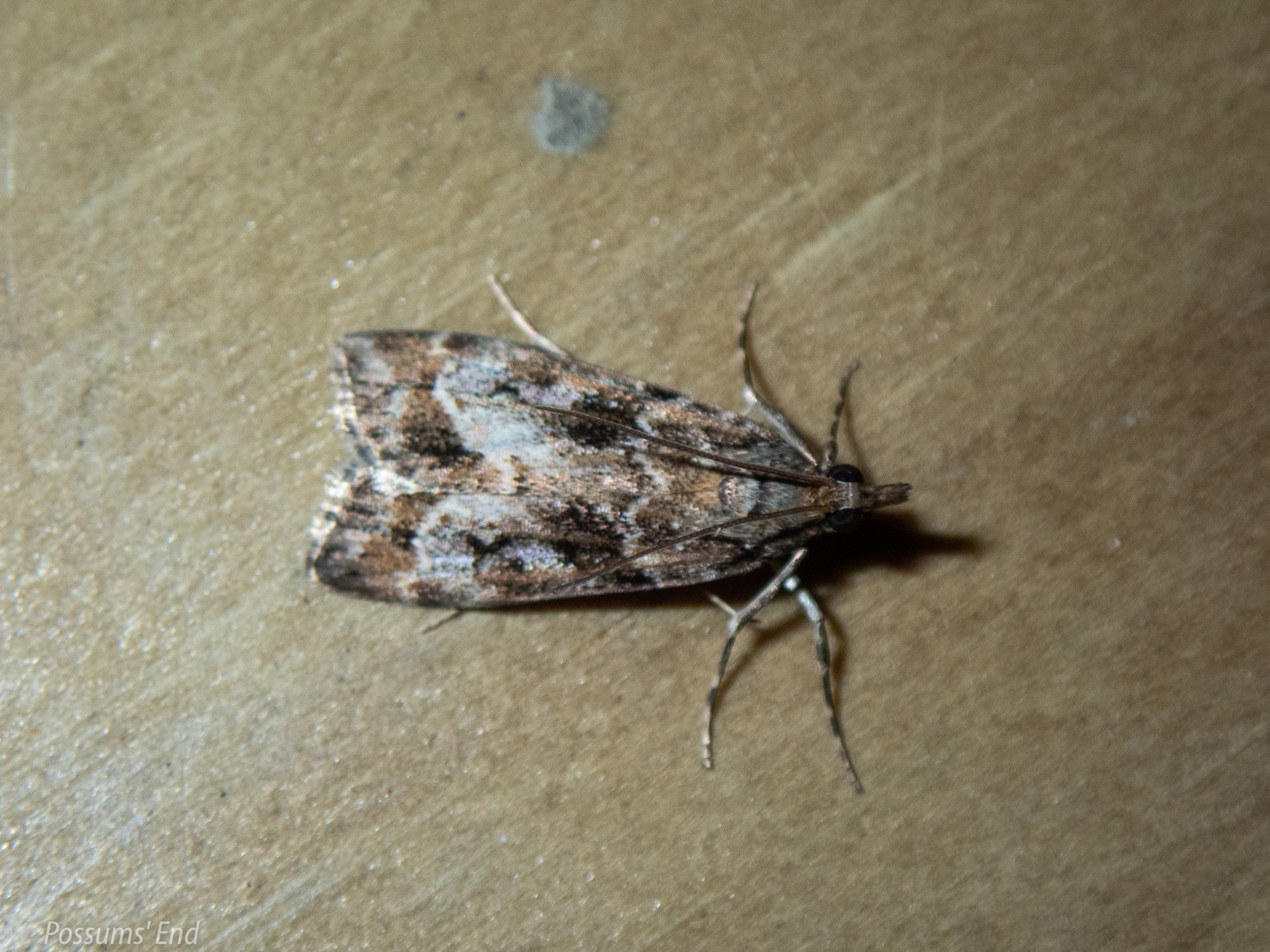

Scientific classification
- Kingdom: Animalia
- Phylum: Arthropoda
- Class: Insecta
- Order: Lepidoptera
- Family: Crambidae
- Genus: Eudonia
- Species: E. luminatrix

Binomial name
- Eudonia luminatrix (Meyrick, 1909)

Synonyms
- Scoparia luminatrix Meyrick, 1909

= Eudonia luminatrix =

Species of moth

Eudonia luminatrix is a moth in the family Crambidae. It was described by Edward Meyrick in 1909. This species is endemic to New Zealand.

The wingspan is 19–22 mm. The forewings are deep ochreous-brown, streaked with blackish on the veins. The first and second lines are white, edged posteriorly with black suffusion. The hindwings are whitish-fuscous tinged with brassy-yellowish. The discal spot, postmedian line and terminal fascia are fuscous. Adults have been recorded on wing in October and November.
