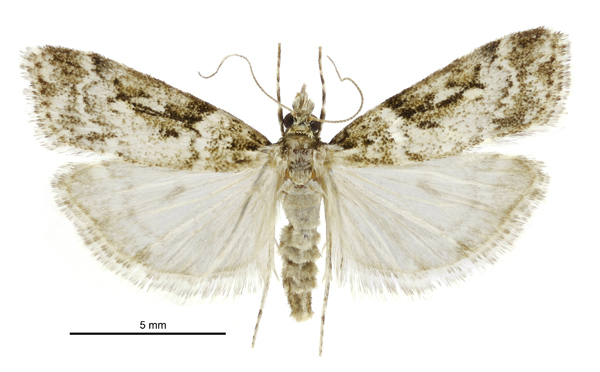
- Female

Scientific classification
- Kingdom: Animalia
- Phylum: Arthropoda
- Class: Insecta
- Order: Lepidoptera
- Family: Crambidae
- Genus: Eudonia
- Species: E. philetaera

Binomial name
- Eudonia philetaera (Meyrick, 1884)

Synonyms
- Scoparia philetaera Meyrick, 1884

= Eudonia philetaera =

Species of moth

Eudonia philetaera is a moth in the family Crambidae. It was named by Edward Meyrick in 1884. Meyrick gave a description of the adult moth in 1885. It is endemic to New Zealand.

The wingspan is about 19 mm. The forewings are white, mixed with light grey and with some fine scattered black scales. There is a suffused blackish spot on the costa at the base. The first line is white and blackish-margined and the second line is whitish, margined with dark anteriorly. The hindwings are very pale whitish-grey. The lunule, postmedian line and hindmargin are slightly darker. Adults have been recorded on wing in January.
