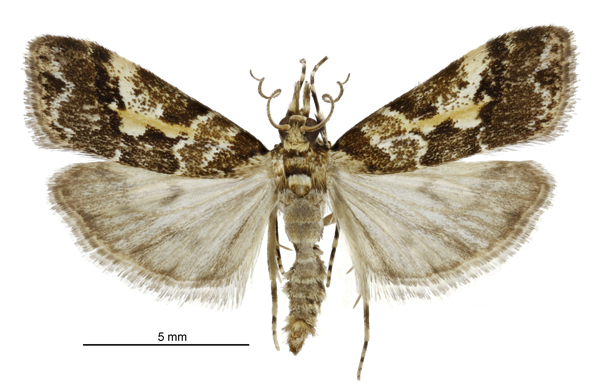

Scientific classification
- Kingdom: Animalia
- Phylum: Arthropoda
- Class: Insecta
- Order: Lepidoptera
- Family: Crambidae
- Genus: Eudonia
- Species: E. characta

Binomial name
- Eudonia characta (Meyrick, 1884)

Synonyms
- Scoparia characta Meyrick, 1884

= Eudonia characta =

Species of moth

Eudonia characta is a species of moth in the family Crambidae. It was named by Edward Meyrick in 1884 and later more fully described the species. It is endemic to New Zealand.

The wingspan is 14–17 mm. The forewings are light fuscous, irrorated (sprinkled) with dark fuscous. The inner margin is whitish ochreous towards the base, margined above with black. The hindwings are pale whitish grey, slightly tinged with ochreous. The central lunule, postmedian line and hindmargin are darker grey. Adults have been recorded on wing in February and March.
