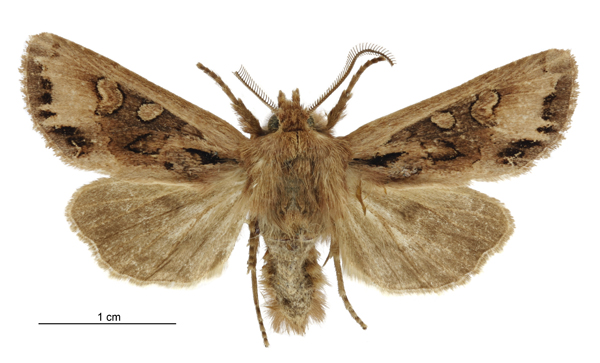
- Female
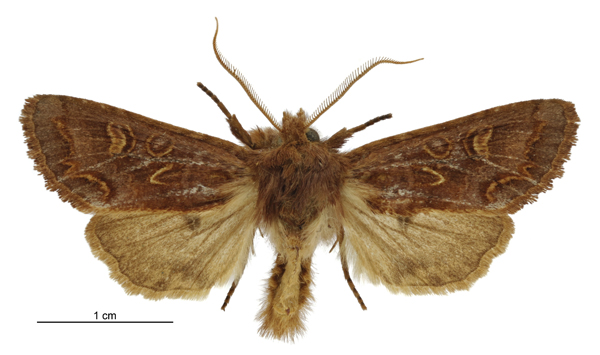
- Male

Scientific classification
- Kingdom: Animalia
- Phylum: Arthropoda
- Clade: Pancrustacea
- Class: Insecta
- Order: Lepidoptera
- Superfamily: Noctuoidea
- Family: Noctuidae
- Genus: Ichneutica
- Species: I. fenwicki

Binomial name
- Ichneutica fenwicki (Philpott, 1921)

Synonyms
- Melanchra fenwicki Philpott, 1921; Graphania fenwicki (Philpott, 1921); Melanchra dives Philpott, 1930; Graphania dives (Philpott, 1930)

= Ichneutica fenwicki =

Species of moth

Ichneutica fenwicki is a moth of the family Noctuidae. This species is endemic to New Zealand and is found in the southern parts of the South Island and on Stewart Island. It is a distinctively coloured moth that is unlikely to be confused with closely related species. It is a spring flying moth being on the wing from September to November. The life history and host species of the larvae of I. fenwicki are unknown.

== Taxonomy ==
This species was first described by Alfred Philpott in 1921 using a specimen collected by Charles Cuthbert Fenwick in Dunedin in September. Philpott originally named the species Melanchra fenwicki. The holotype specimen is held at the Museum of New Zealand Te Papa Tongarewa. In 1930 Philpott, thinking he was describing a new species, also named the species Melanchra dives. In 1988 J. S. Dugdale, in his catalogue of New Zealand lepidoptera, placed this species within the genus Graphania and synonymised Melanchra dives with G. fenwicki.

In 2019 Robert Hoare undertook a major review of New Zealand Noctuidae. During this review the genus Ichneutica was greatly expanded and the genus Graphania was subsumed into that genus as a synonym. As a result of this review, this species is now known as Ichneutica fenwicki.

== Description ==
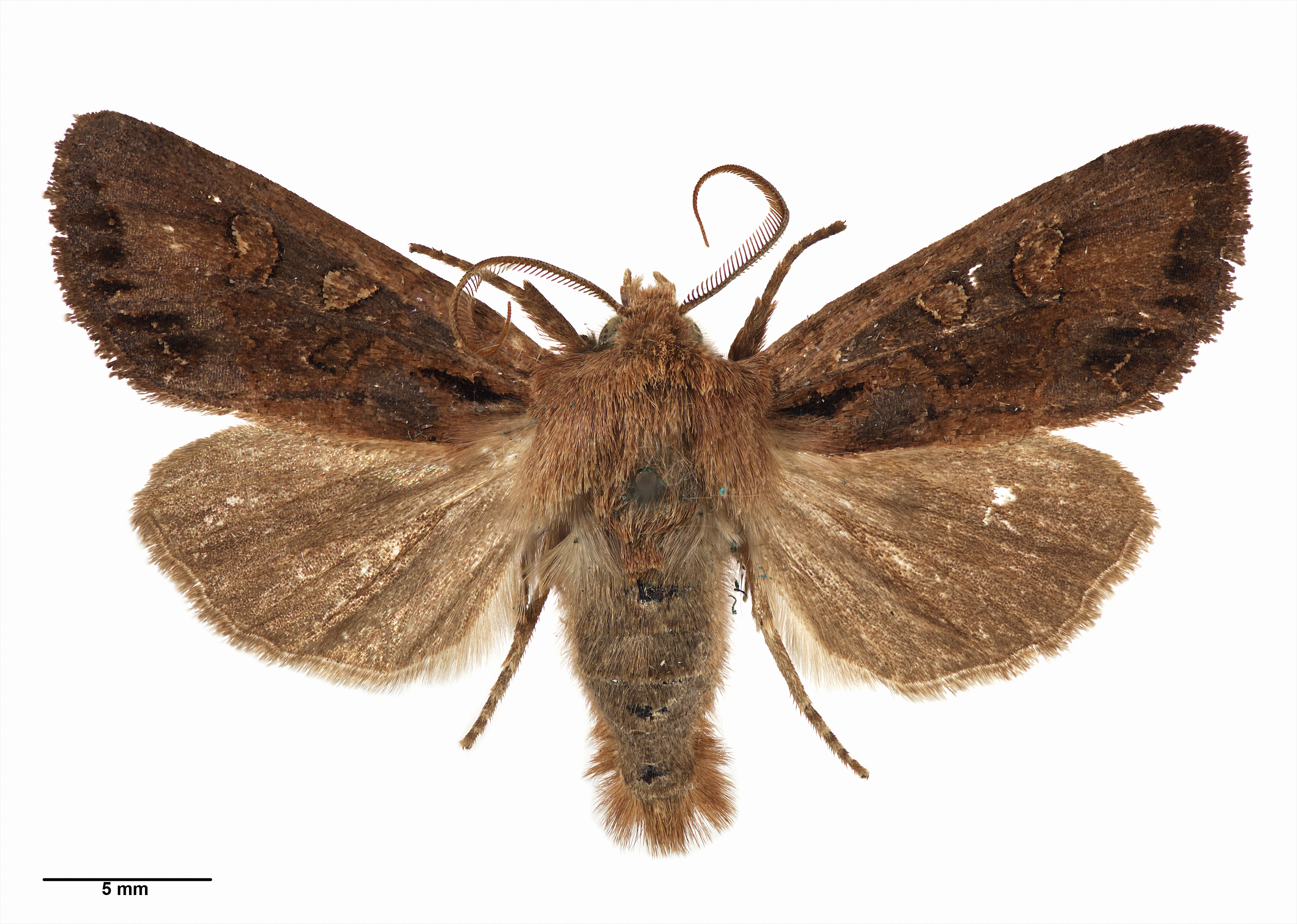
Male holotype specimen of Ichneutica fenwicki

Philpott described the species as follows:

♂. 37 mm. Head, palpi, and thorax reddish-brown. Antennae reddish-brown, bipectinated, apex simple, pectinations 3 1/2. Abdomen greyish-brown, lateral and anal tufts reddish-ochreous. Legs reddish-brown, tarsi obscurely annulated with paler. Forewings moderate, costa slightly sinuate, termen evenly rounded, oblique; dark reddish-brown; an obscure basal fascia mixed with blackish; stigmata ringed with ochreous-white, faintly margined with black; orbicular circular, well defined; claviform sub-circular, obscure; reniform upright, regular; subterminal line parallel with termen, thin, slightly and irregularly serrate, ochreous-white, suffusedly margined anteriorly with brownish-black : cilia uniform reddish-brown. Hindwings and cilia pale reddish-fuscous, tips of cilia whitish.

The male of this species has a wingspan of between 36 and 42 mm and the female of the species has a wingspan of between 43 and 47 mm. I. fenwicki is distinctive in appearance and its large size, the brown-red shade of ground colour as well as the dark markings on its forewings ensure it is unlikely to be confused with closely related species.

== Distribution ==
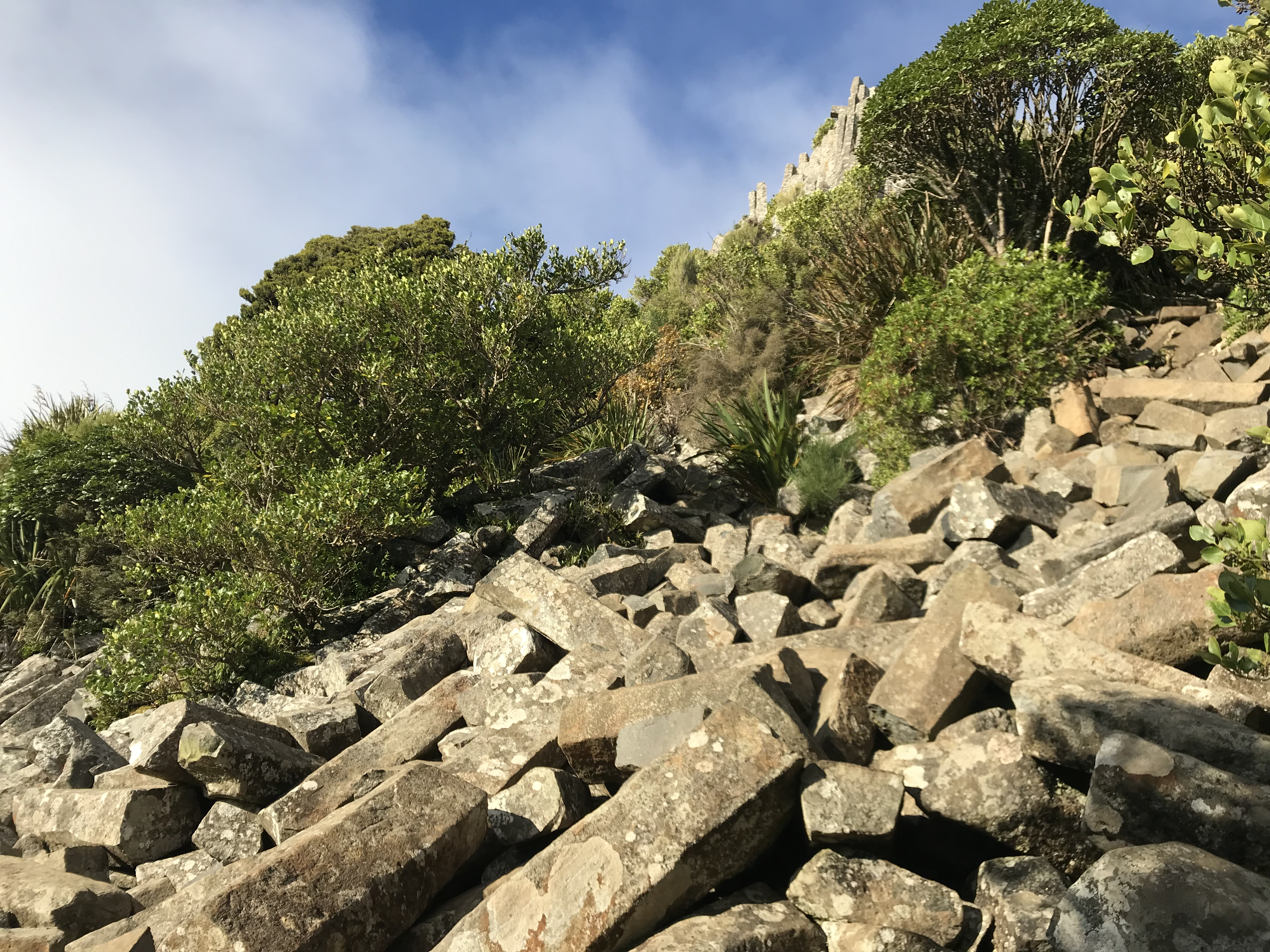
Mount Cargill, Dunedin - a known location for I. fenwicki

This species is endemic to New Zealand. It is only found in the southern parts of the South Island and on Stewart Island. It occurs locality in such places as Swampy Summit and Mt Cargill in Dunedin and at Tautuku Peninsula and Purakaunui Bay in The Catlins.

== Behaviour ==
Adults of this species are on the wing from September to November. This species is attracted to light.

== Life cycle and host species ==
The life history of this species is unknown as are the host species of the larvae of I. fenwicki.
