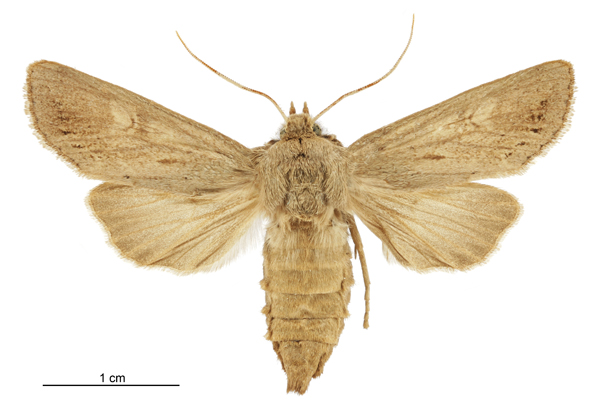
- Female
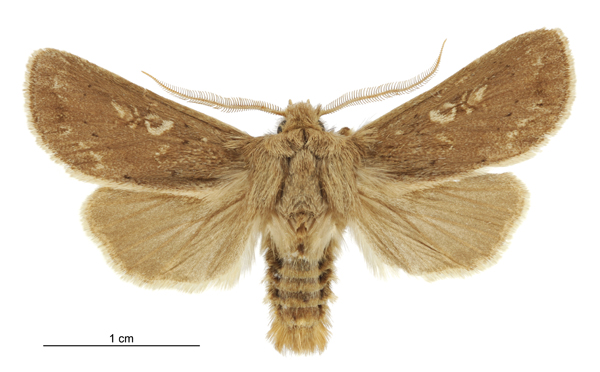
- Male

Scientific classification
- Kingdom: Animalia
- Phylum: Arthropoda
- Clade: Pancrustacea
- Class: Insecta
- Order: Lepidoptera
- Superfamily: Noctuoidea
- Family: Noctuidae
- Genus: Ichneutica
- Species: I. pagaia

Binomial name
- Ichneutica pagaia (Hudson, 1909)

Synonyms
- Leucania pagaia Hudson, 1909; Graphania pagaia (Hudson, 1909)

= Ichneutica pagaia =

Species of moth

Ichneutica pagaia is a moth of the family Noctuidae. I. pagaia is endemic to New Zealand and can only be found on the Snares Islands. This species is unlikely to be confused with moths with a similar appearance as it is the only noctuid found in the Snares Islands. Its preferred habitat is tussock grasslands and the hosts for its larvae are likely Poa astonii and Poa tennantiana. Adults of this species are on the wing from November to February.

== Taxonomy ==
This species was described by George Hudson in 1909 from a specimen collected by Dr. Benham on the Snares Islands during the 1907 Sub-Antarctic Islands Scientific Expedition. Hudson originally named the species Leucania pagaia. The holotype specimen is held at the Museum of New Zealand Te Papa Tongarewa. In 1988 J. S. Dugdale placed this species within the Graphania genus. In 2019 Robert Hoare undertook a major review of New Zealand Noctuidae species. During this review the genus Ichneutica was greatly expanded and the genus Graphania was subsumed into that genus as a synonym. As a result of this review, this species is now known as Ichneutica pagaia.

== Description ==
Dugdale described the larvae of this species as follows:

Dorsal line double, zone between this and the level of seta D2 marbled, bounded ventrally by a continuous dark narrow band; then a very pale, narrow (?white) stripe; the zone from seta SD1 level to 1/2 spiracle height level dark, marbled ventrally, including seta SD2 but emarginate round each spiracle; rest of body pallid, not marbled, prolegs with an oblique dark patch dorso-caudad of the SV setal group. Head capsule with pallid zone around setae A2, A3, extending as a stripe to apex of adfrontal area.

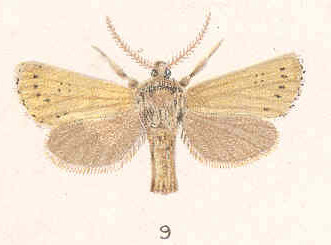
Ichneutica pagaia illustrated by Hudson

Hudson described the adults of this species as follows:

The expansion of the wings is 1 1/2 in. The head and thorax are rather dark brownish-ochreous, very densely scaled, the latter with a slight anterior crest. The abdomen is paler. The antennae are reddish-brown, moderately bipectinated, the pectinations without ciliations. The forewings are rather broad, with the apex rounded, and the termen very oblique towards the tornus, brownish-ochreous slightly tinged with greenish; the markings are very obscure, consisting of four minute black dots marking the boundaries of the reniform stigmata, a group of blackish scales a little before the end of vein 1; four small patches of blackish scales between veins 2 and 3, 3 and 4. 4 and 5, and 5 and 6 respectively. The hind wings are rather dark brownish-ochreous, slightly reddish-tinged. The cilia of all the wings are ochreous.

The adult male has a wingspan of between 32.5 and 38 mm and the adult female has a wingspan of between 35.5 and 40 mm. As I. pagaia is the only recorded noctuid in the Snares Islands it is unlikely to be confused with other species of moth. Although it is similar in appearance to the Auckland Islands species I. erebis, I. pagaia can be distinguished as it has very pale ochreous antennae.

== Distribution ==
This species is endemic to New Zealand. It is only found in the Snares Islands.

== Habitat ==
The preferred habitat of this moth appears to be tussock grassland.

== Behaviour ==
The adults of this species are on the wing from November to February.

== Life history and host species ==
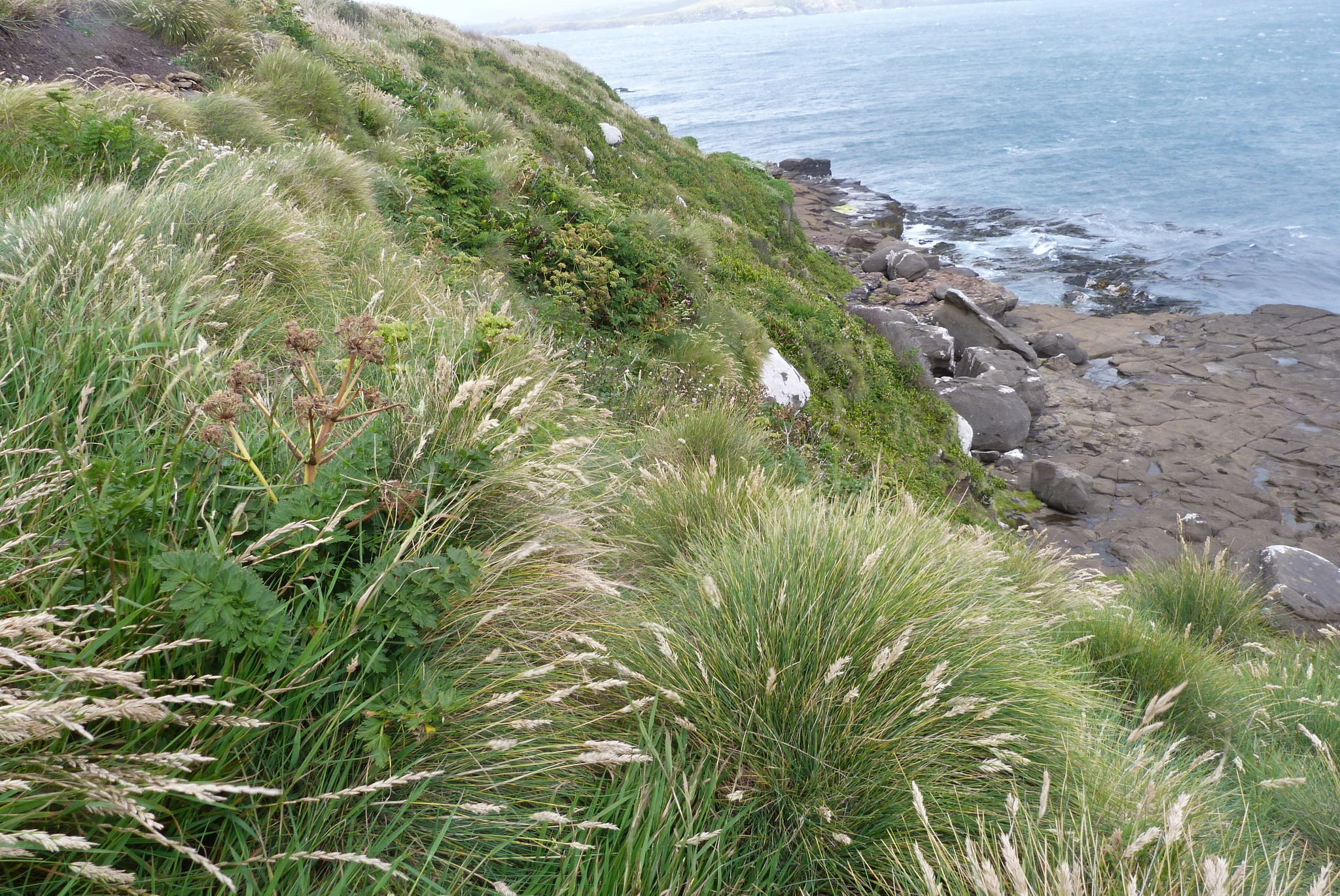
Poa astonii host plant of the larvae of I. pagaia

The host species for the larvae of I. pagaia are likely to be the tussock grasses Poa astonii and Poa tennantiana.
