= Ichneutica naufraga =

Conservation status
- Data Deficit (NZ TCS)

Scientific classification
- Kingdom: Animalia
- Phylum: Arthropoda
- Clade: Pancrustacea
- Class: Insecta
- Order: Lepidoptera
- Superfamily: Noctuoidea
- Family: Noctuidae
- Genus: Ichneutica
- Species: I. naufraga

Binomial name
- Ichneutica naufraga Hoare, 2019

Species of moth

Ichneutica naufraga is a moth of the family Noctuidae. This species is endemic to New Zealand. It is only found on Big South Cape Island. The host of I. naufraga larvae is Poa foliosa, upon which the larvae feed at night. Adult moths have been recorded on the wing in November. This species can be distinguished from the visually similar I. mutans as both the male and female of the former species lack the distinctive dark marking that can be found on the forewings of I. mutans. The female I. naufraga is coloured a brown shade as opposed to the grey I. mutans and the male I. naufraga has longer antenna pectinations. In 2025 this species was classified as "data deficient" under the New Zealand Threat Classification System.

== Taxonomy ==
I. naufraga was first described by Robert Hoare in 2019. The male holotype specimen was collected by J. S. Dugdale in November 1968 and is held by the New Zealand Arthropod Collection. Hoare justified erecting this species based on the difference in the forewing appearance, antenna and genitals of adults of the species. This species has not been collected since 1968.

== Description ==
The wingspan of the adult male of this species is between 35 and 37 mm and for the adult female is between 35 and 41 mm. I. naufraga is similar in appearance to I. mutans. It can be distinguished from that species as the male I. naufraga has longer pectinations that also reach further along the antennae, the female is coloured a brown rather than a grey shade and both the male and female lack a dark marking that can be found on the forewings of the I. mutans.

== Distribution ==
This species is endemic to New Zealand and is only found on the Big South Cape Island, off Stewart Island.

== Behaviour ==
Adults of I. naufraga are on the wing in November but may also be present in surrounding months as no sampling has been done outside of November. This species is attracted to light.

== Life history and host species ==
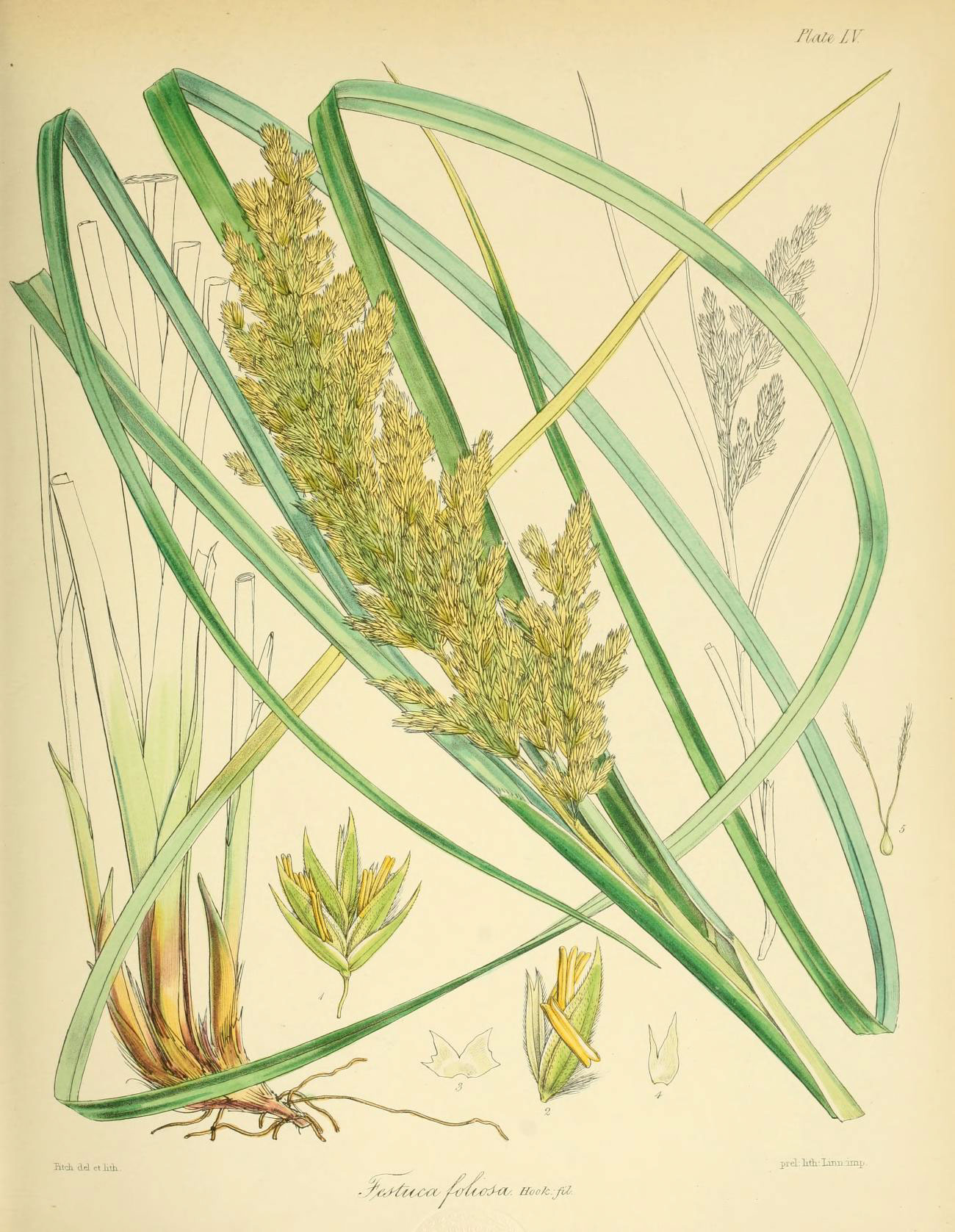
Poa foliosa, host species of larvae of I. naufraga

The larvae of this species feed on Poa foliosa at night. Both larvae and pupa have been collected amongst this plant but, as at 2021, no description of the larva and pupae has been made.

== Conservation status ==
In 2025 this species was classified by the New Zealand Department of Conservation as "data deficient" under the New Zealand Threat Classification System. This species is regarded as an island endemic, is found only at one location and is range restricted.
