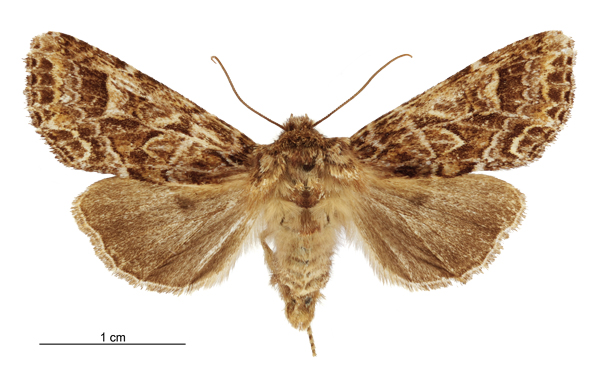
- Female
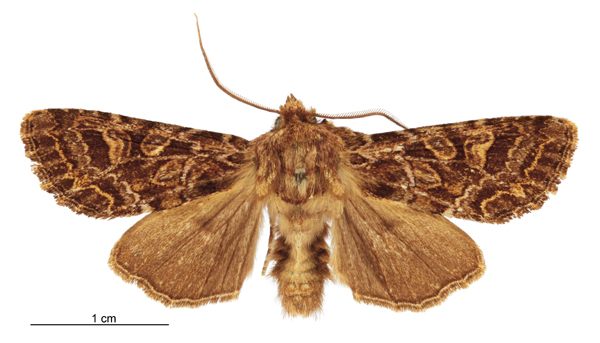
- Male

Scientific classification
- Kingdom: Animalia
- Phylum: Arthropoda
- Clade: Pancrustacea
- Class: Insecta
- Order: Lepidoptera
- Superfamily: Noctuoidea
- Family: Noctuidae
- Genus: Ichneutica
- Species: I. brunneosa

Binomial name
- Ichneutica brunneosa (Fox, 1970)

Synonyms
- Melanchra brunneosa Fox, 1970; Graphania brunneosa (Fox, 1970)

= Ichneutica brunneosa =

Species of moth

Ichneutica brunneosa is a moth of the family Noctuidae. This species is endemic to New Zealand. It can be found in the North Island from Mount Te Aroha and in the South Island from the Coromandel to Stewart Island. However it appears to not be present in the centre of the South Island. The distinctive colour and patterns on the forewing of this species ensures it is unlikely to be confused with similar species. It inhabits native forests with higher rainfall and is attracted to mercury vapour light traps. The life history of I. brunneosa is unknown as are the host species of its larvae but the adults of the species are on the wing from October to January.

== Taxonomy ==
This species was first described by Kenneth John Fox in 1970 under the name Melanchra brunneosa. He used a male holotype collected from the south side of Mount Taranaki at 1700 ft, a female allotype collected at Lake Waikaremoana, and four male paratypes also collected from Mount Taranaki. The holotype specimen is held at the National Museum of New Zealand Te Papa Tongarewa. J. S. Dugdale in his catalogue placed this species within the Graphania genus. In 2019 Robert Hoare undertook a major review of New Zealand Noctuidae species. During this review the genus Ichneutica was greatly expanded and the genus Graphania was subsumed into that genus as a synonym. As a result of this review, this species is now known as Ichneutica brunneosa.

== Description ==
Fox described the species as follows:

Antennae, head, thorax, abdomen, legs, and wings ochreous brown in ground colour. Antennae of the♂ with posterior (outer) pectinations half the length of anterior (inner) pectinations. Wingspan: 35-38mm. Forewing pattern: Basal streak absent; basal, medium, subterminal lines all yellowish ocherous, lined with dark-brown. No distinct median band. Claviform outlined in yellowish ochreous, margined on terminal side with dark brown; orbicular outlined in yellowish ochreous, as large as reniform, lying obliquely; reniform similarly outlined. Subterminal line with 2 blunt tooth-like markings below middle, teeth not reaching termen. Hindwings ochreous brown, darker with ♂. Underside of forewings with reniform obsolete, underside of hindwings with a discal spot, no subterminal line or shade.

The wingspan for the male of the species is between 32 and 37 mm and for the female of the species is between 34 and 39 mm. The distinctive colouration and patterns on the forewings of this moth ensures that it is unlikely to be confused with other species.

== Distribution ==
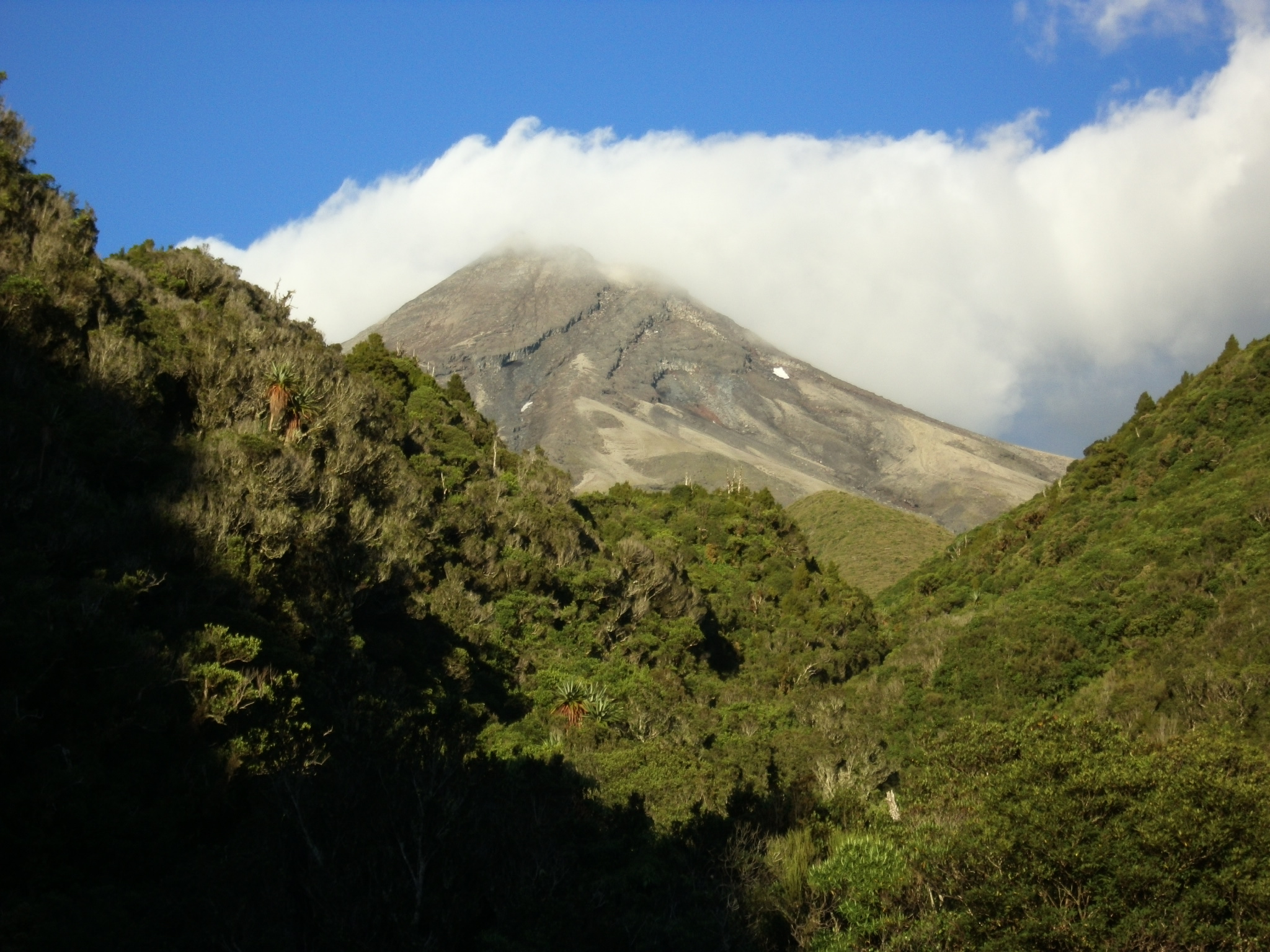
Mount Taranaki, the type locality of I. brunneosa

I. brunneosa is endemic to New Zealand. In the North Island this species has been observed at Mount Te Aroha which may be the northern most locality this moth can be found. This species is also found in the South Island from Coromandel to Stewart Island. However this species does not appear to be present in the centre of the South Island.

== Habitat ==
This species exists in native forests at localities with higher rainfalls.

== Behaviour ==
This is a species that is attracted to mercury vapour light traps. Adult moths are on the wing from October to January.

== Life history and hosts ==
The life history of this species is unknown as are the host species of its larvae.
