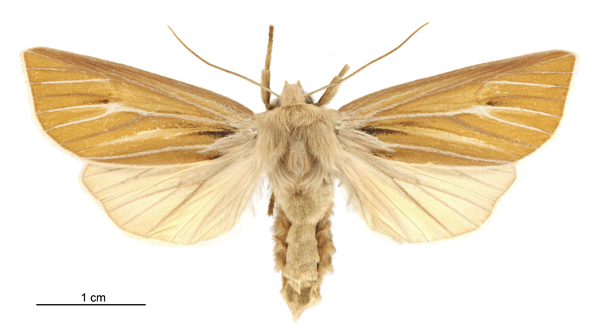
- Ichneutica ceraunias, female

Scientific classification
- Kingdom: Animalia
- Phylum: Arthropoda
- Class: Insecta
- Order: Lepidoptera
- Superfamily: Noctuoidea
- Family: Noctuidae
- Subfamily: Noctuinae
- Genus: Ichneutica; Meyrick, 1887

Synonyms
- Graphania Hampson, 1905; Tmetolophota Hampson, 1905; Dipaustica Meyrick, 1912; Alysia Guenée, 1868 (nec Latreille, 1804); Maoria Warren, 1912 (nec Laporte, 1868); Alysina Cockerell, 1913

= Ichneutica =

Genus of moths, endemic to New Zealand

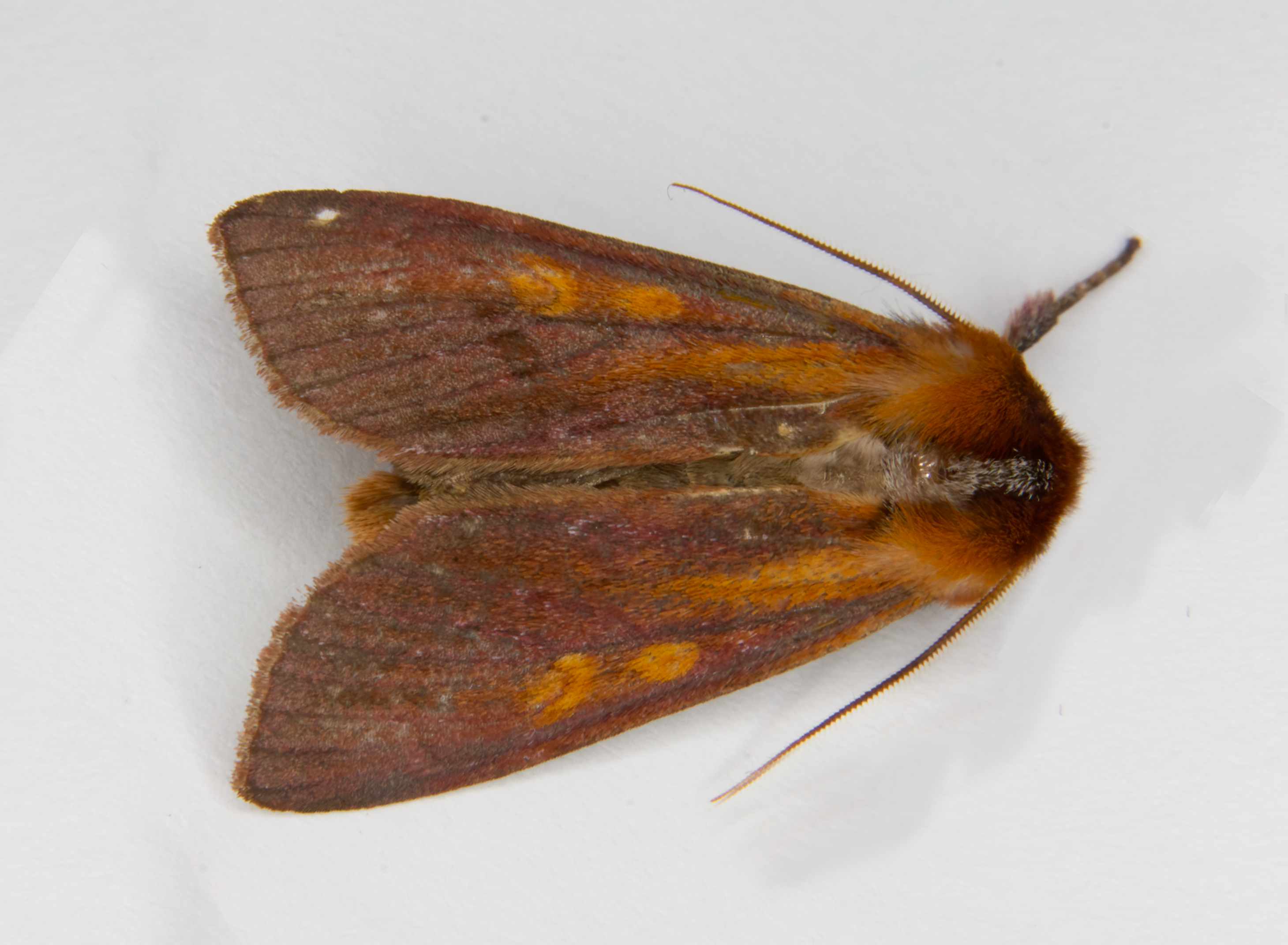
Ichneutica purdii

Ichneutica is a genus of cutworm or dart moths in the family Noctuidae. The genus is found in New Zealand and surrounding islands. There are more than 80 described species in Ichneutica, the largest known genus of Lepidoptera in New Zealand. In 2019 this genus was revised and greatly expanded with the genera Graphania Hampson, 1905, Tmetolophota Hampson, 1905 and Dipaustica Meyrick, 1912 all subsumed within it.

== Species ==
These species belong to the genus Ichneutica:

- Ichneutica acontistis (Meyrick, 1887)
- Ichneutica agorastis (Meyrick, 1887)
- Ichneutica alopa (Meyrick, 1887)
- Ichneutica arotis (Meyrick, 1887)
- Ichneutica atristriga (Walker, 1865)
- Ichneutica averilla (Hudson, 1921)
- Ichneutica barbara Hoare, 2019
- Ichneutica blenheimensis (Fereday, 1883)
- Ichneutica bromias (Meyrick, 1902)
- Ichneutica brunneosa (Fox, 1970)
- Ichneutica cana Howes, 1914
- Ichneutica ceraunias Meyrick, 1887
- Ichneutica chlorodonta (Hampson, 1911)
- Ichneutica chryserythra (Hampson, 1905)
- Ichneutica cornuta Hoare, 2019
- Ichneutica cuneata (Philpott, 1916)
- Ichneutica dione Hudson, 1898
- Ichneutica disjungens (Walker, 1858)
- Ichneutica dundastica Hoare, 2019
- Ichneutica emmersonorum Hoare, 2019
- Ichneutica epiastra (Meyrick, 1911)
- Ichneutica erebia (Hudson, 1909)
- Ichneutica eris Hoare, 2019
- Ichneutica falsidica (Meyrick, 1911)
- Ichneutica fenwicki (Philpott, 1921)
- Ichneutica fibriata (Meyrick, 1913)
- Ichneutica haedifrontella Hoare, 2019
- Ichneutica hartii (Howes, 1914)
- Ichneutica infensa (Walker, 1857)
- Ichneutica inscripta Hoare, 2019
- Ichneutica insignis (Walker, 1865)
- Ichneutica lignana (Walker, 1857)
- Ichneutica lindsayorum (Dugdale, 1988)
- Ichneutica lissoxyla (Meyrick, 1911)
- Ichneutica lithias (Meyrick, 1887)
- Ichneutica lyfordi Hoare, 2019
- Ichneutica marmorata (Hudson, 1924)
- Ichneutica maya (Hudson, 1898)
- Ichneutica micrastra (Meyrick, 1897)
- Ichneutica moderata (Walker, 1865)
- Ichneutica mollis (Howes, 1908)
- Ichneutica morosa (Butler, 1880)
- Ichneutica mustulenta Hoare, 2019
- Ichneutica mutans (Walker, 1857)
- Ichneutica naufraga Hoare, 2019
- Ichneutica nobilia (Howes, 1946)
- Ichneutica notata Salmon, 1946
- Ichneutica nullifera (Walker, 1857)
- Ichneutica olivea (Watt, 1916)
- Ichneutica oliveri (Hampson, 1911)
- Ichneutica omicron (Hudson, 1898)
- Ichneutica omoplaca (Meyrick, 1887)
- Ichneutica pagaia (Hudson, 1909)
- Ichneutica panda (Philpott, 1920)
- Ichneutica paracausta (Meyrick, 1887)
- Ichneutica paraxysta (Meyrick, 1929)
- Ichneutica pelanodes (Meyrick, 1931)
- Ichneutica peridotea Hoare, 2019
- Ichneutica petrograpta (Meyrick, 1929)
- Ichneutica phaula (Meyrick, 1887)
- Ichneutica plena (Walker, 1865)
- Ichneutica prismatica Hoare, 2019
- Ichneutica propria (Walker, 1856)
- Ichneutica purdii (Fereday, 1883)
- Ichneutica rubescens (Butler, 1879)
- Ichneutica rufistriga Hoare, 2019
- Ichneutica sapiens (Meyrick, 1929)
- Ichneutica schistella Hoare, 2019
- Ichneutica scutata (Meyrick, 1929)
- Ichneutica seducta Hoare, 2019
- Ichneutica semivittata (Walker, 1865)
- Ichneutica sericata (Howes, 1945)
- Ichneutica similis (Philpott, 1924)
- Ichneutica sistens (Guenée, 1868)
- Ichneutica skelloni (Butler, 1880)
- Ichneutica sollennis (Meyrick, 1914)
- Ichneutica steropastis (Meyrick, 1887)
- Ichneutica stulta (Philpott, 1905)
- Ichneutica subcyprea Hoare, 2019
- Ichneutica sulcana (Fereday, 1880)
- Ichneutica supersulcana Hoare, 2019
- Ichneutica thalassarche Hoare, 2019
- Ichneutica theobroma Hoare, 2019
- Ichneutica toroneura (Meyrick, 1901)
- Ichneutica unica (Walker, 1856)
- Ichneutica ustistriga (Walker, 1857)
- Ichneutica virescens (Butler, 1879)
