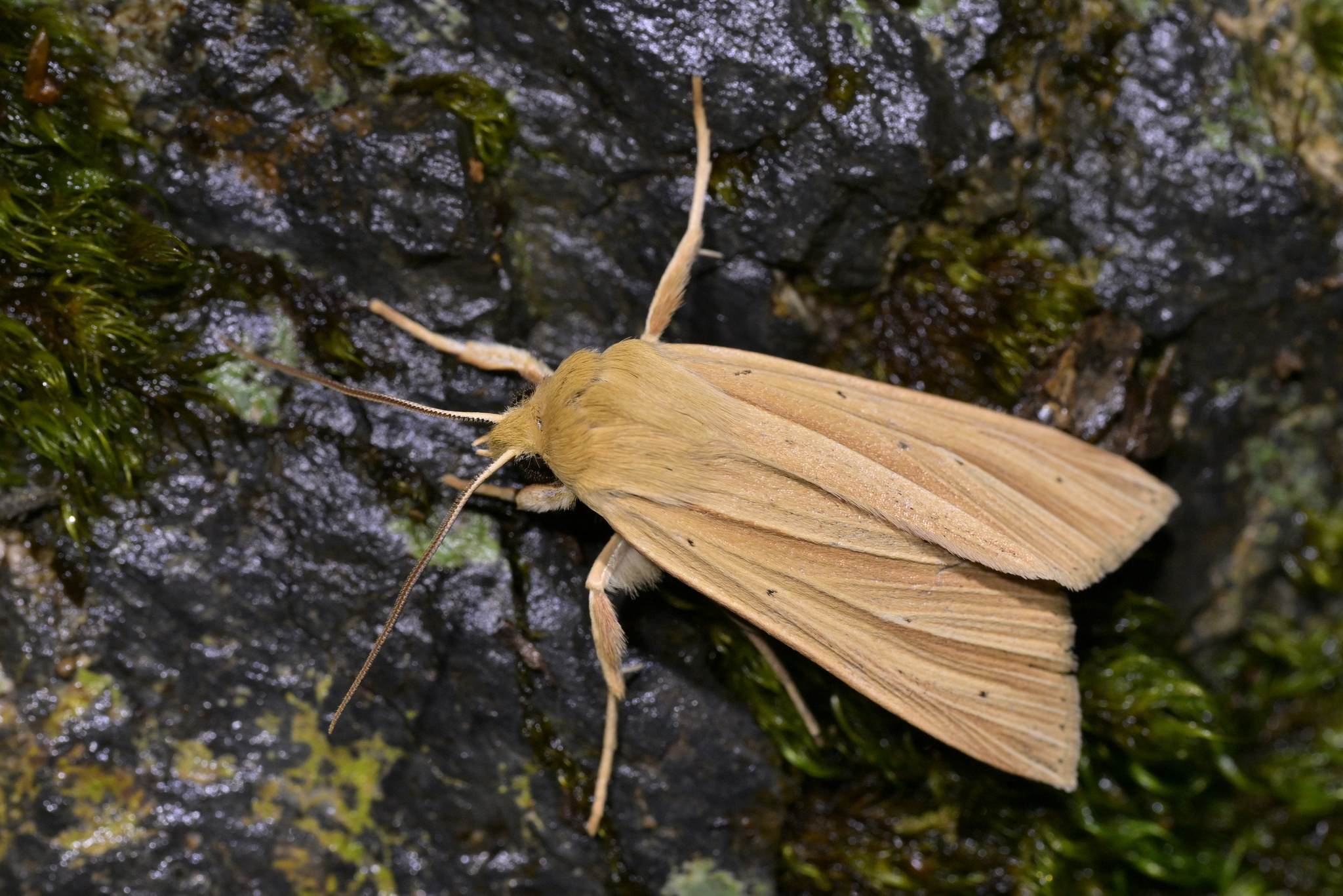

Scientific classification
- Kingdom: Animalia
- Phylum: Arthropoda
- Clade: Pancrustacea
- Class: Insecta
- Order: Lepidoptera
- Superfamily: Noctuoidea
- Family: Noctuidae
- Genus: Ichneutica
- Species: I. supersulcana

Binomial name
- Ichneutica supersulcana Hoare, 2019

= Ichneutica supersulcana =

Species of moth

Ichneutica supersulcana is a species of moth in the family Noctuidae. This species is endemic to New Zealand and is only known from the Tararua Ranges and at Tongariro National Park. This species has been collected in subalpine tussock grasslands as well as subalpine shrubland and at the margins of Fuscospora cliffortioides forest. The life history of this species is unknown as are the host species of its larvae. The adults of this species are on the wing in February and are attracted to light. It appears to be restricted to higher altitudes in comparison to its close relative I. sulcana. I. sulcana and I. supersulcana are very similar in appearance with no reliable visible differences between the two having been discovered. However, there are distinct differences in the male abdomen and genitalia of these two species.

== Taxonomy ==
This species was first described by Robert Hoare in 2019. The male holotype specimen was collected by G. W. Gibbs at the Dundas Hut in the Tararua Range and is held in the New Zealand Arthropod Collection.

== Description ==
The adult male wingspan is between 41 and 47 mm whereas the female wingspan is 48 mm. I. sulcana and I. supersulcana are very similar in appearance with no reliable visible differences between the two having been discovered. However I. supersulcana tends to be larger and paler with less well defined longitudinal dark streaks to its forewings. There are distinct differences in the male abdomen and genitalia of these two species.

== Distribution ==
This species is endemic to New Zealand. It is only known from the North Island and has only been collected in the Tararua Ranges and at Tongariro National Park. It appears to be restricted to higher altitudes in comparison to its close relative I. sulcana.

== Habitat ==
This species has been collected in subalpine tussock grasslands as well as subalpine shrubland and at the margins of Fuscospora cliffortioides forest.

== Behaviour ==
The adults of this species are on the wing in February and are attracted to light.

== Life history and host species ==
The life history of this species is unknown as are the host species of its larvae.
