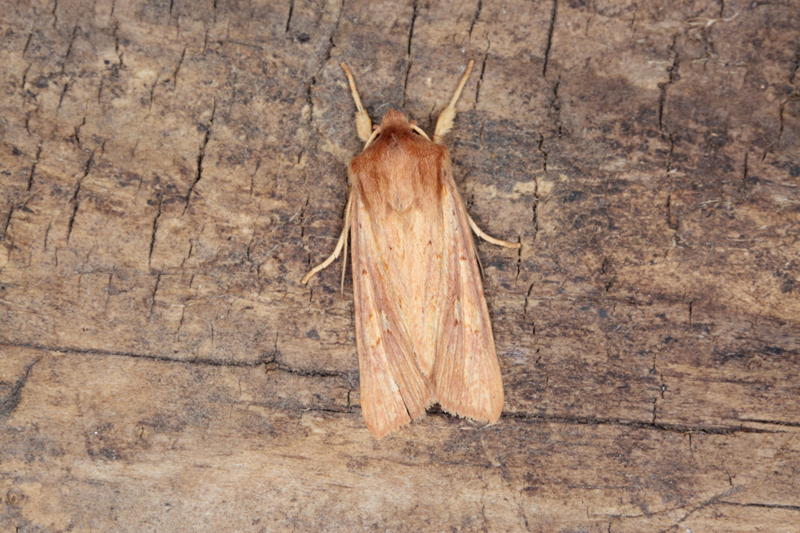

Scientific classification
- Kingdom: Animalia
- Phylum: Arthropoda
- Clade: Pancrustacea
- Class: Insecta
- Order: Lepidoptera
- Superfamily: Noctuoidea
- Family: Noctuidae
- Genus: Ichneutica
- Species: I. seducta

Binomial name
- Ichneutica seducta Hoare, 2019

= Ichneutica seducta =

Species of moth

Ichneutica seducta is a moth of the family Noctuidae. This species is endemic to New Zealand. It is found only in the Chatham Islands and inhabits native forest. The life history of this species is unknown but the larval host species is likely to be Dracophyllum arboreum. The adults of this species are on the wing from November to January and are attracted to light.

== Taxonomy ==
This species was first described by Robert Hoare in 2019. The male holotype specimen was collected at Awatotara in the Chatham Islands by J. S. Dugdale and is held in the New Zealand Arthropod Collection.

== Description ==
This species is variable in colour, ranging from a pale-grey ochreous colour to a bright orange-brown. It has a single-colour thorax which does not have any marks, dark-coloured hindwings and has a large, S-shaped kidney mark on its forewings. It is unlikely to be confused with other moths in its range, but the male genitalia of this species is very similar to I. semivittata.

== Distribution ==
This species is endemic to New Zealand. This species is only known from the Chatham Islands and has been found on Chatham, Pitt and Rangatira Islands.

== Habitat ==
This species has been collected in Chatham Islands native forest.

== Behaviour ==
The adults of this species are on the wing from November to January and are attracted to light.

== Life history and host species ==
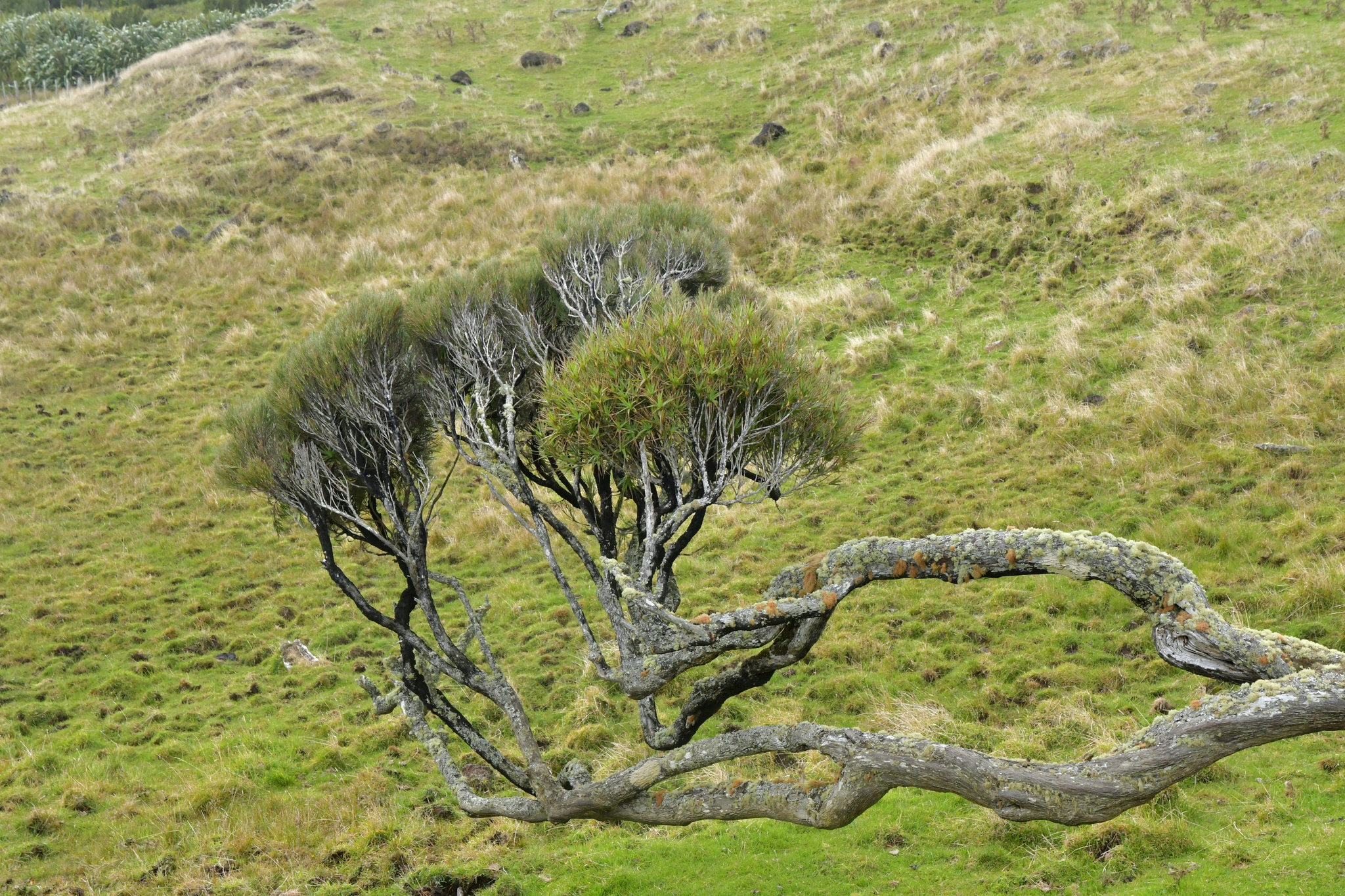
Dracophyllum arboreum the likely larval host species of I. seducta

The life history of this species is unknown but the larval host species is likely to be Dracophyllum arboreum.
