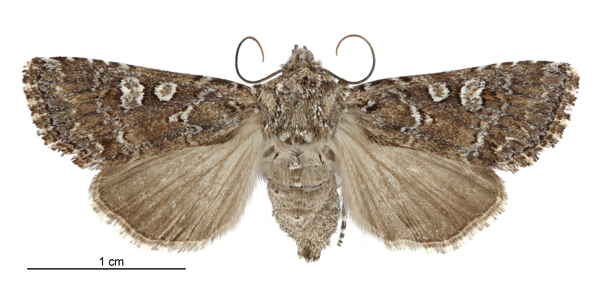
- Female
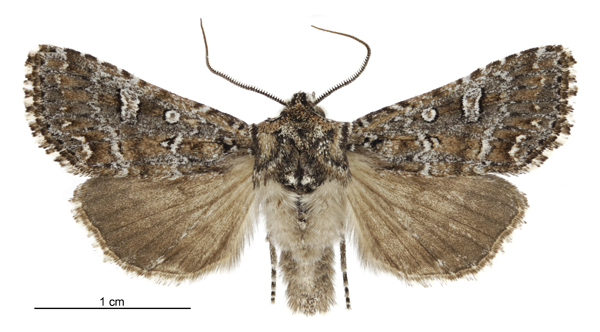
- Male

Scientific classification
- Kingdom: Animalia
- Phylum: Arthropoda
- Clade: Pancrustacea
- Class: Insecta
- Order: Lepidoptera
- Superfamily: Noctuoidea
- Family: Noctuidae
- Genus: Ichneutica
- Species: I. lithias

Binomial name
- Ichneutica lithias (Meyrick, 1887)

Synonyms
- Mamestra lithias Meyrick, 1887; Graphania lithias (Meyrick, 1887); Melanchra lithias (Meyrick, 1887)

= Ichneutica lithias =

Species of moth

Ichneutica lithias is a moth of the family Noctuidae. This species is endemic to New Zealand. It is a small moth but distinctive as a result of the markings on its forewings. Although this species is widespread in the South Island, it has only been collected in the Rangipo Desert in the North Island. The species prefers habitat that is scrubland ranging in altitude from coastal to alpine. Adults are on the wing from October to April and larvae have been collected and reared on the New Zealand endemic plant species Melicytus alpinus.

== Taxonomy ==
This species was first described by Edward Meyrick in 1887 from two specimens collected at Castle Hill near Christchurch by J. D. Enys. Meyrick originally named the species Mamestra lithias. The lectotype of the species is male and is held at the Canterbury Museum in the Fereday Collection. In 1988 J. S. Dugdale placed this species within the Graphania genus. In 2019 Robert Hoare undertook a major review of New Zealand Noctuidae. During this review the genus Ichneutica was greatly expanded and the genus Graphania was subsumed into that genus as a synonym. As a result of this review, this species is now known as Ichneutica lithias.

== Description ==
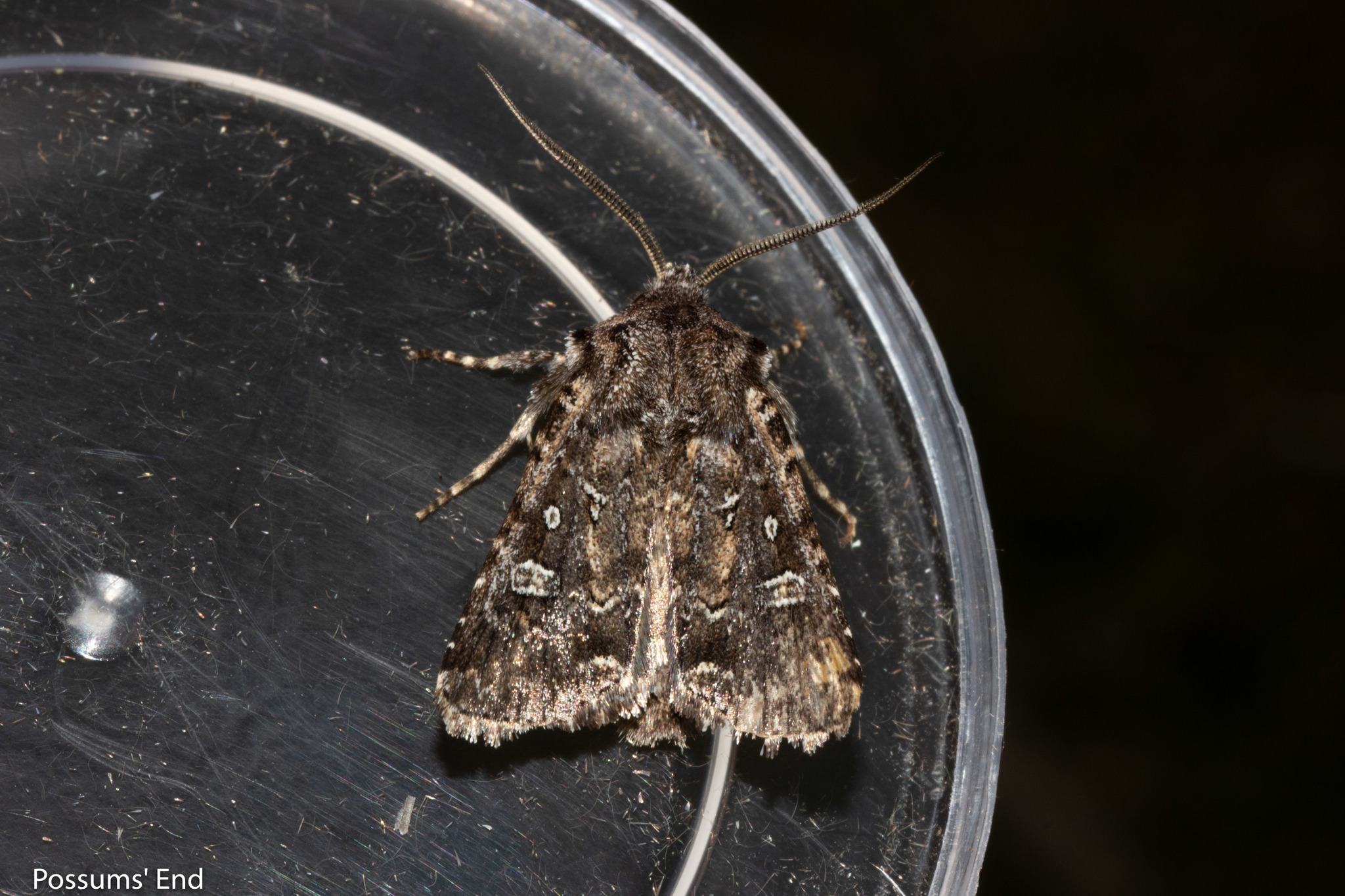
Ichneutica lithias observed at Saint Bathans

Meyrick described the species as follows:

Male. — 33 mm. Head, palpi, and thorax white, densely irrorated with black and fuscous; patagia with two obscure black longitudinal streaks. Antennae grey, with strong triangular transverse dentations (1), terminating in tufts of cilia. Abdomen grey. Legs dark grey, irrorated with white, banded with black and white, spurs white with median black band. Forewings moderately dilated, costa straight, apex obtuse, hind-margin waved, somewhat oblique, rounded beneath; fuscous, irregularly suffused with grey; veins coarsely and broadly irrorated with black and white; lines white, slender, subdentate, irregularly blackish-margined; a dark median shade; orbicular small, round, white, fuscous-centred, black-margined; claviform very small, but conspicuous, round, black, minutely white-centred; reniform oblong, white, fuscous-centred, black-margined; subterminal more obscure, nearly touching hind-margin beneath costa, with two indistinct, rather more acute, teeth below middle : cilia rather dark grey, slenderly barred with white. Hindwings grey; a darker hind-marginal line; cilia white, with a pale grey line.

This is a small moth with the male having a wingspan of between 28 and 35 mm and the female of between 33 and 38 mm. It is unlikely to be confused with closely related species as it has distinctive kidney shaped and circular marks on its forewings that are ringed in white.

== Distribution ==
It is endemic to New Zealand. This species is found in the North Island only in the Rangipo Desert. However it is widespread in the South Island.

== Habitat ==
In the South Island this species inhabits shrublands and tussock grassland ranging from coastal to alpine zones. In the North Island this species has been collected in native forest in the Rangipo Desert amongst volcanic dunes.

== Behaviour ==
The adults of this species are on the wing from October to April.

== Life history and host species ==
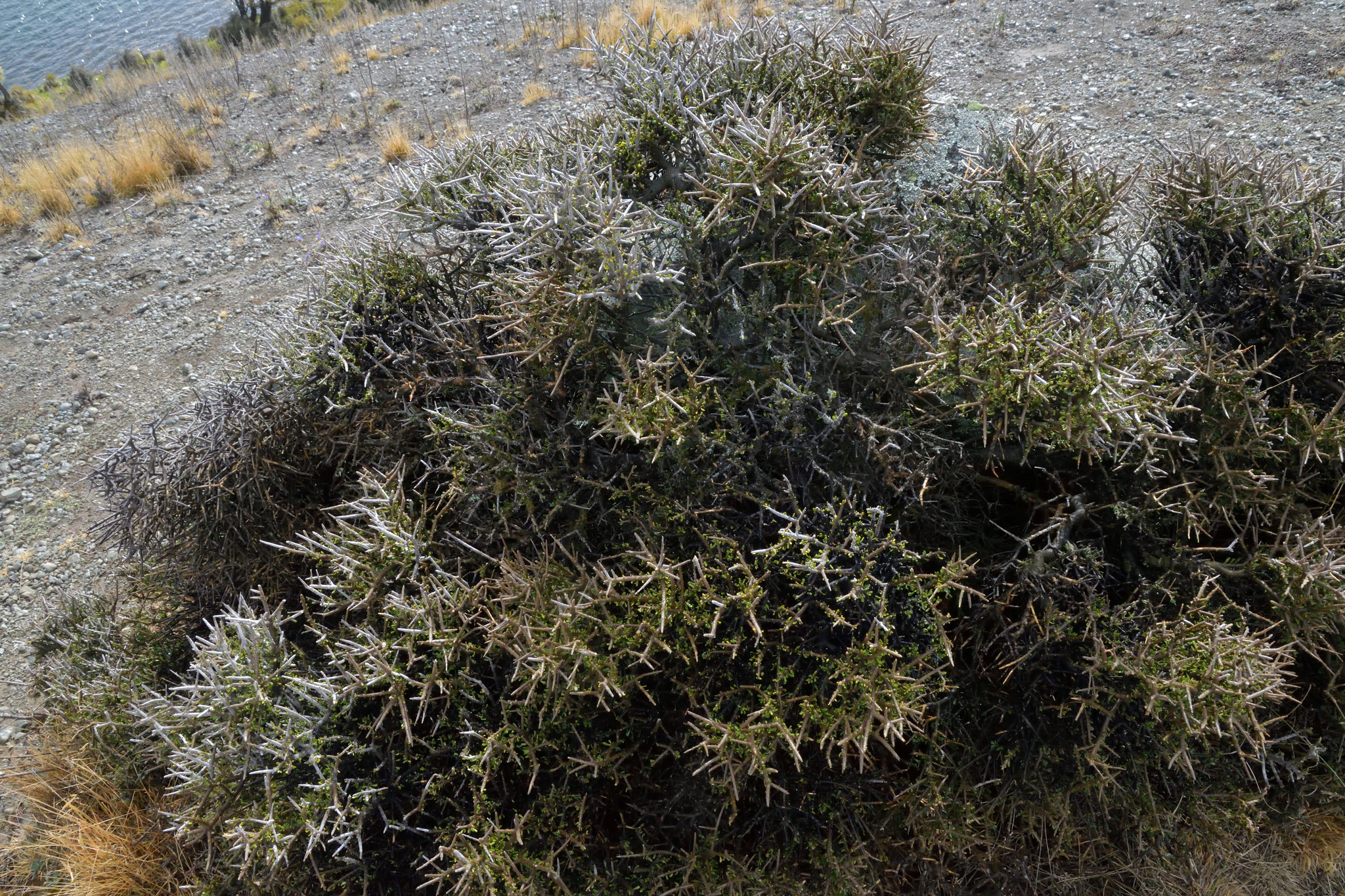
Melicytus alpinus, host species of I. lithias

The larvae of this species has yet to be described. Larvae have been collected and reared on Melicytus alpinus.
