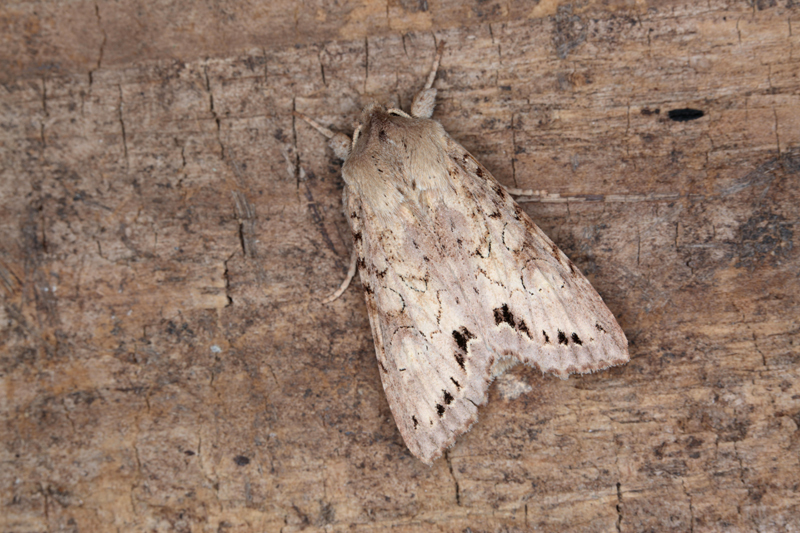

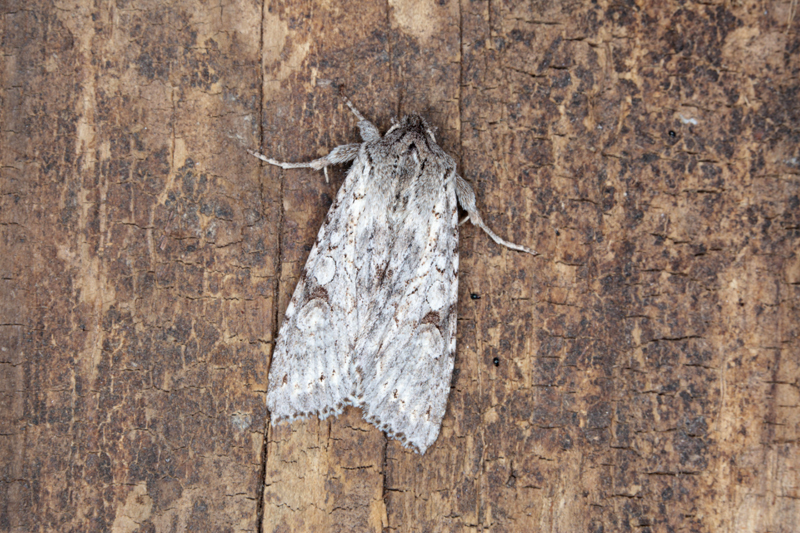

Scientific classification
- Kingdom: Animalia
- Phylum: Arthropoda
- Clade: Pancrustacea
- Class: Insecta
- Order: Lepidoptera
- Superfamily: Noctuoidea
- Family: Noctuidae
- Genus: Ichneutica
- Species: I. thalassarche

Binomial name
- Ichneutica thalassarche Hoare, 2019

= Ichneutica thalassarche =

Species of moth

Ichneutica thalassarche is a moth of the family Noctuidae. This species is endemic to New Zealand and is only found in the Chatham Islands. It has been collected at Chatham Island, Pitt Island and Rangatira Island. The life history of this species is unknown as are the host species of its larvae. The adults of this species are large with a pale grey thorax and forewing. A diagnostic feature is the pattern on its forewing which is a white subterminal line joined by black "teeth" markings. This species has been recorded as a winter flyer having been collected in June to August.

== Taxonomy ==
This species was described by Robert Hoare in 2019. The male holotype specimen was collected by L. Smith on Pitt Island in the Chatham Islands and is held at the Entomology Research Museum, Lincoln University.

== Description ==
The adult male of this species has a wingspan of 47 mm and the female has a wingspan 50 mm. This species is large with a pale grey thorax and forewing. A diagnostic feature of this species is the pattern on its forewing which is a white subterminal line joined by black "teeth" markings.

== Distribution ==
This species is endemic to New Zealand and has only been found on the Chatham Islands. It has been collected at Chatham Island, Pitt Island and Rangatira Island.

== Behaviour ==
This species has been recorded as a winter flyer having been collected in June to August.

== Life history and host species ==
The life history of this species is unknown as are the host species of its larvae.
