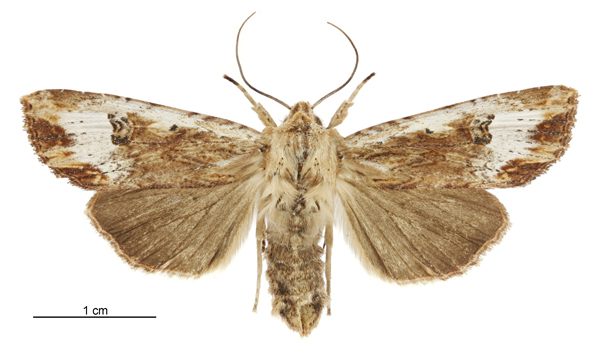
- Female
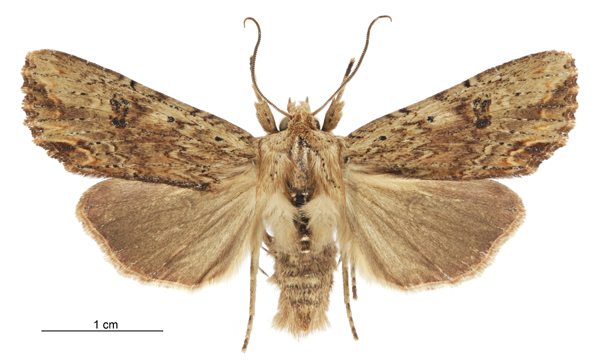
- Male

Scientific classification
- Kingdom: Animalia
- Phylum: Arthropoda
- Clade: Pancrustacea
- Class: Insecta
- Order: Lepidoptera
- Superfamily: Noctuoidea
- Family: Noctuidae
- Genus: Ichneutica
- Species: I. rubescens

Binomial name
- Ichneutica rubescens (Butler, 1879)

Synonyms
- Xylophasia rubescens Butler, 1879; Melanchra rubescens (Butler, 1879); Graphania rubescens (Butler, 1879)

= Ichneutica rubescens =

Species of moth

Ichneutica rubescens is a moth of the family Noctuidae. It is endemic to New Zealand. This species can be found locally in the North Island but is widespread throughout the South Island and is present on both Stewart Island and the Auckland Islands. I. rubescens has a round or oval mark near the centre of the forewing that encloses a dot. This is diagnostic of this species. I. rubescens inhabits tussock grasslands, beech as well as podocarp forests. Larval hosts are likely herbaceous plants such as grasses and herbs and larvae have been reared on Gunnera prorepens. Adults of this species are on the wing from December to April and are attracted to light.

== Taxonomy ==
This species was first described in 1879 by Arthur Gardiner Butler from a specimen obtained in Otago by Frederick Wollaston Hutton. Butler named the species Xylophasia rubescens. The holotype male specimen is held at the Natural History Museum, London. In 1988 J. S. Dugdale, in his catalogue on New Zealand Lepidoptera, placed this species within the Graphania genus. In 2019 Robert Hoare undertook a major review of New Zealand Noctuidae species. During this review the genus Ichneutica was greatly expanded and the genus Graphania was subsumed into it as a synonym. As a result of this review, this species is now known as Ichneutica rubescens.

== Description ==
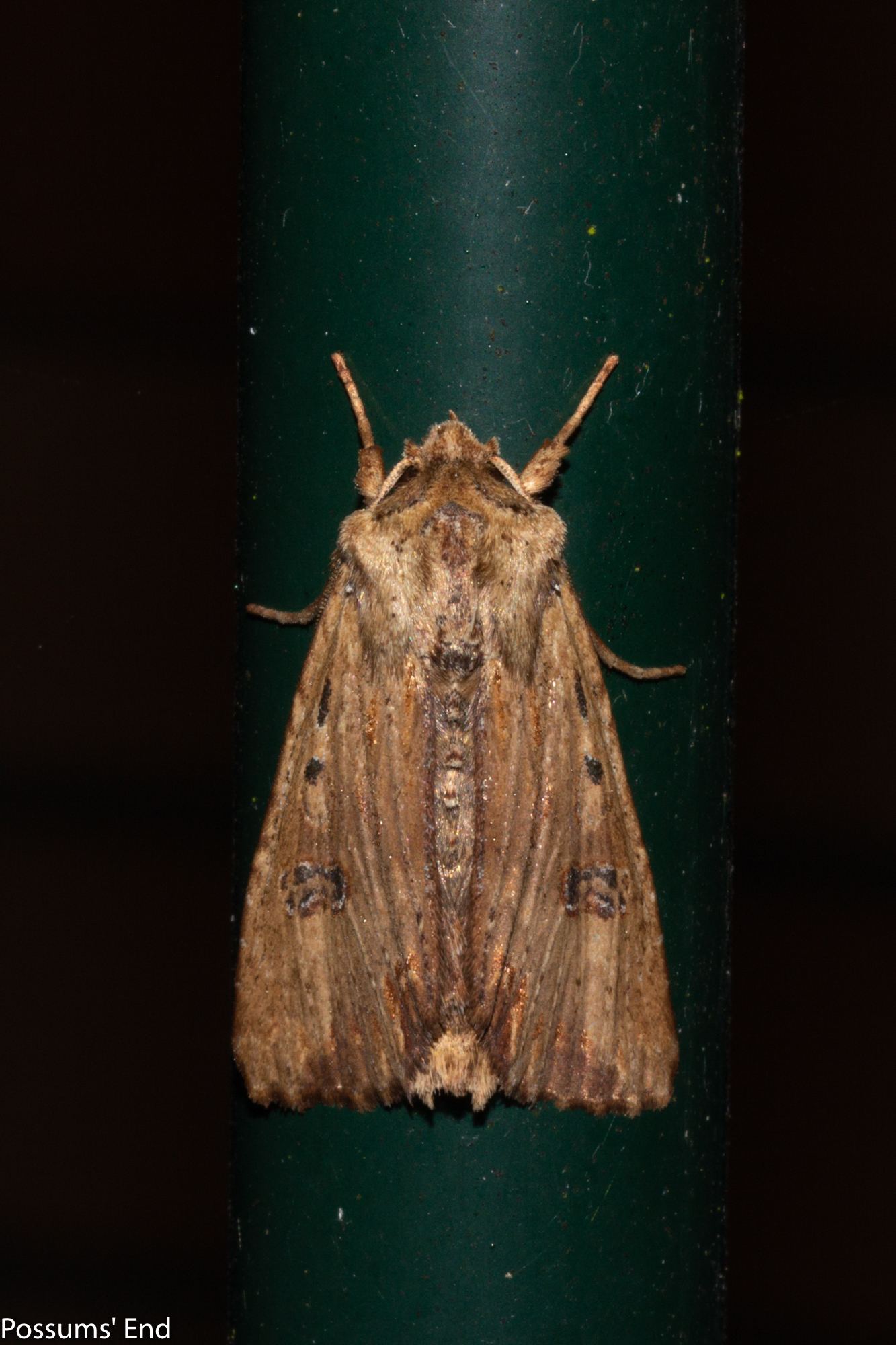
Ichneutica rubescens attracted to a light trap.

Brian Patrick has described the larvae of this species as moss green with black markings.

Butler described the adults of this species as follows:

Primaries sandy pale brown, with the ordinary markings (including the cuneiform external patch, and a diffused patch at external angle) ferruginous; reniform spot enclosing a blackish J -shaped marking, and bounded externally by two black dots; orbicular represented by a black dot, below which is an oblique ferruginous dash; a discal arched series of minute black dots on the veins; secondaries smoky-brown, with rosy-cupreous reflections, fringe and margin sandy -brown; body pale sandy-brown; thorax somewhat ferruginous down the centre; abdomen whitish at the base, with four brown-banded dorsal tufts; under surface uniform pale shining sandy-brown, with faint rosy reflections; discocellulars blackish. Expanse of wings 1 inch 7 lines.

The wingspan of the adult male is between 38 and 45 mm and the wingspan of the female is between 38 and 44 mm. This species has a round or oval mark near the centre of the forewing that encloses a dot. This is diagnostic of this species.

== Distribution ==
It is endemic to New Zealand. This species can be found in locations in the North Island, throughout the South Island and in Stewart and the Auckland Islands.

== Habitat ==
This species occurs in native and tussock grasslands along with beech and podocarp forests.

== Behaviour ==
Adults of this species are on the wing from December to April. This species is attracted to light and have been collected via a mercury vapour light trap.

== Life history and host species ==
The life history of this species has yet to be written up in detail. Larval hosts are likely herbaceous plants such as grasses and larvae have been reared on Gunnera prorepens, a native ground cover species.
