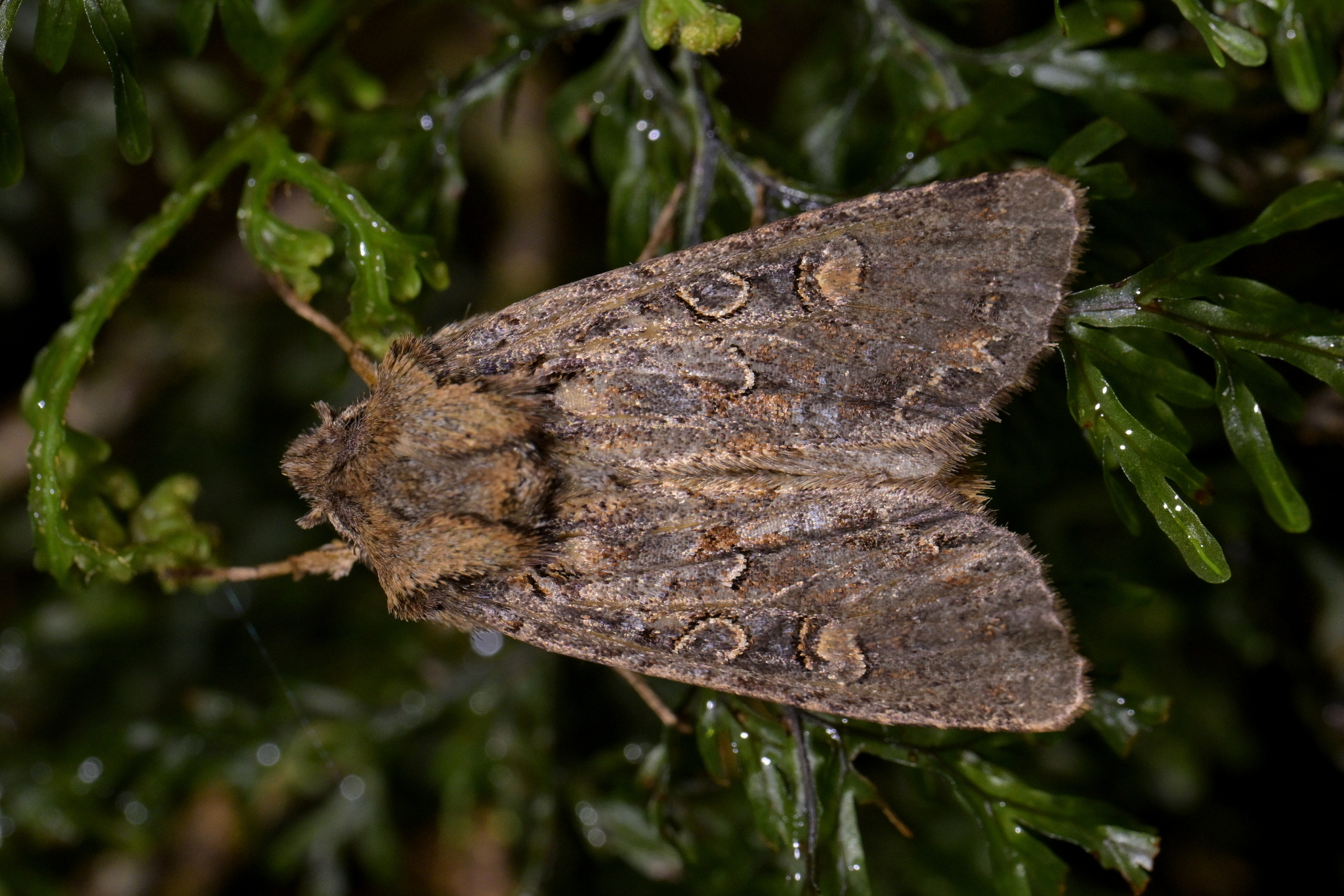

Conservation status
- Data Deficit (NZ TCS)

Scientific classification
- Kingdom: Animalia
- Phylum: Arthropoda
- Clade: Pancrustacea
- Class: Insecta
- Order: Lepidoptera
- Superfamily: Noctuoidea
- Family: Noctuidae
- Genus: Ichneutica
- Species: I. dundastica

Binomial name
- Ichneutica dundastica Hoare, 2019

= Ichneutica dundastica =

Species of moth endemic to New Zealand

Ichneutica dundastica is a species of moth in the family Noctuidae. It was first described by Robert Hoare in 2019. This species is endemic to New Zealand. As at 2019, this species had only been found near the Dundas Hut in the Tararua Range, but has since been found near Powell Hut, Jumbo Hut, and outside of the Tararua Range near Manganui Lodge, Taranaki Maunga. It inhabits alpine shrubland and is attracted to light. The life history of this species is unknown as are the host species of its larvae. Adults are on the wing from late November to early December. The female of the species is larger and more conspicuous than the male. In 2025 this species was classified as "data deficient" under the New Zealand Threat Classification System.

== Taxonomy ==
This species was first described by Robert Hoare in 2019. The male holotype was collected at Dundas Hut in the Tararua Range in December by J. S. Dugdale. The holotype specimen is held in the New Zealand Arthropod Collection. This species is named in honour of its type locality Dundas Hut.

== Description ==
The female of this species is more conspicuous in appearance in comparison to the undistinguished appearance of the male of the species. Along with the restrictive range of this species, the male can be distinguished from similar species as the pectinations on its antennae are very long. The female can be distinguished from similar species as it is large in size and has distinctive colouration and markings on its forewings. The male has a wingspan of between 38.5 and 42 mm whereas the female has a wingspan of between 39.5 and 45 mm.

== Distribution and habitat ==
I. dundastica is endemic to New Zealand and has only been collected in the Tararua Range. This species inhabits alpine shrubland.

== Behaviour ==
Adults of this species are attracted to light. As at 2019 adults are only current known to be on the wing between late November and early December. However more sampling needs to be undertaken to confirm the months in which adults of this species are active.

== Life history and hosts ==
The life history of this species is unknown as are the host species of its larvae.

== Conservation status ==
In 2025 this species was classified by the New Zealand Department of Conservation as "data deficient" under the New Zealand Threat Classification System. There is difficulty is verifying the identity of this species.
