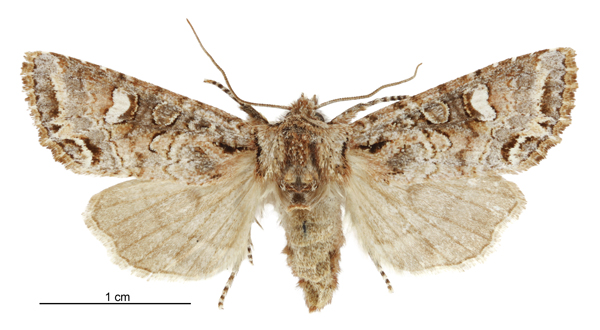
- Female
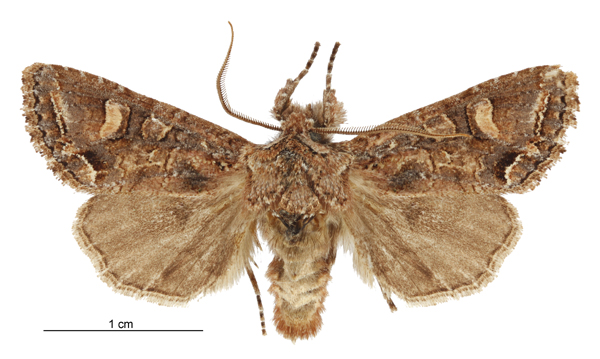
- Male

Conservation status
- Data Deficit (NZ TCS)

Scientific classification
- Kingdom: Animalia
- Phylum: Arthropoda
- Clade: Pancrustacea
- Class: Insecta
- Order: Lepidoptera
- Superfamily: Noctuoidea
- Family: Noctuidae
- Genus: Ichneutica
- Species: I. sericata

Binomial name
- Ichneutica sericata (Howes, 1945)

Synonyms
- Melanchra sericata Howes, 1945; Graphania sericata (Howes, 1945)

= Ichneutica sericata =

Species of moth

Ichneutica sericata is a moth of the family Noctuidae. It is endemic to New Zealand. This species is variable and difficult to distinguish from I. skelloni specimens. It is known from the southern part of the South Island and from Stewart Island. There has been one specimen collected in Taranaki but although Robert Hoare determined the species, he expressed reservations given the location of collection. I. sercata inhabits shrubland at altitudes of between 470 and 900m. The life history of this species is unknown as are the host species of its larvae. The adults of this species are on the wing in August at Stewart Island and in November and December in the South Island. In 2025 this species was classified as "data deficient" under the New Zealand Threat Classification System.

== Taxonomy ==
This species was first described by George Howes in 1945 from specimens taken near the Homer tunnel. The lectotype specimen is held at the Museum of New Zealand Te Papa Tongarewa. In 1988 J. S. Dugdale placed this species within the Graphania genus. In 2019 Robert Hoare undertook a major review of New Zealand Noctuidae species. During this review the genus Ichneutica was greatly expanded and the genus Graphania was subsumed into that genus as a synonym. As a result of this review, this species is now known as Ichneutica sericata.

== Description ==
Howes described this species as follows:

Wing expanse, 40 mm. Head, red-brown. Palpi prominent, densely clothed with red-brown. Antennae red-brown, pectinations long. Thorax rich red-brown, crests well developed. Abdomen grey-brown, with side and posterior tufts red-brown. Forewings dark red-brown. Apex moderately acute, termen slightly bowed. Basal line dark brown (almost black) edged on both sides with light brown and strongly angled outwards at centre of wing. This line does not reach dorsum. First line dark red-brown, edged with lighter brown. Second line indistinct but slightly darker than the surrounding area. Subterminal line bright red-brown, with a blunt projection towards termen just below the apex, two toothlike projections at about two-thirds below apex, the upper being narrower and shorter than the lower. These projections do not reach the terminal edge. There is a dark brown suffusion from the terminal line to the termen tending to grey at the outer edge and at the apex. Cilia warm brown, tipped with ochreous, with darker bars at the vein endings. A dark, almost black, suffusion crosses wing from between orbicular and reniform to half way along dorsum, and extends outwards on the lower portion of the wing to the subterminal line just below the tooth-like markings. Reniform and orbicular outlined in black, the reniform being light red in centre, the orbicular dark centred. Veins on lower area of the forewing lightly outlined in grey intermixed with black spots. Hindwings dull ochreous-brown, evenly coloured. Cilia lighter, having also a dark line at base.

The wingspan of the male is between 34 and 40 mm and the wingspan of the female is between 37 and 39 mm. This species is variable and difficult to distinguish from I. skelloni specimens. However the male I. sericata has longer pectinations on its antennae. Paler forms of this species have forewings that are mostly the same reddish brown colour. The hindwing has a discal spot that is distinctive. The darker forms of this species, found in Fiordland and Stewart Island, have a less distinct discal spot.

== Distribution ==
It is endemic to New Zealand. This species is known from the southern part of the South Island as well as Table Hill at Stewart Island. There is one specimen collected in the Pouakai Range, Taranaki in the North Island. Having examined the specimen, Hoare identified it as I. sericata but had reservations given the location of its collection.

== Habitat ==
This species has been collected in shrubland at altitudes of between 470 and 900 m.

== Behaviour ==
Adults of this species are on the wing in August in Stewart Island and between November and December for the South Island.

== Life history and host species ==
The life history of this species is unknown as are the host species of its larvae.

== Conservation status ==
In 2025 this species was classified by the New Zealand Department of Conservation as "data deficient" under the New Zealand Threat Classification System. Data related to this moth is poor as a result of difficulty in identifying this species.
