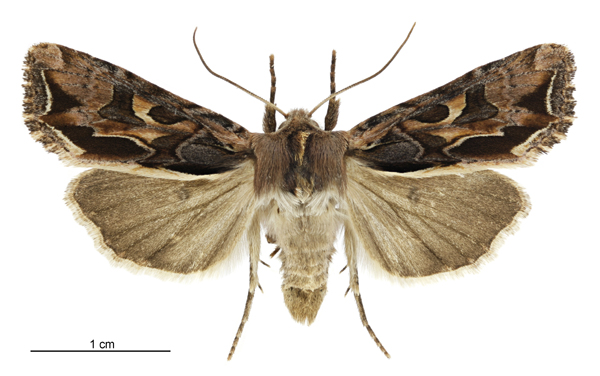
- Female
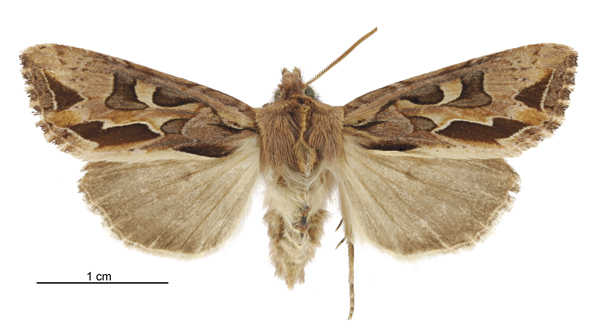
- Male

Scientific classification
- Kingdom: Animalia
- Phylum: Arthropoda
- Clade: Pancrustacea
- Class: Insecta
- Order: Lepidoptera
- Superfamily: Noctuoidea
- Family: Noctuidae
- Genus: Ichneutica
- Species: I. maya

Binomial name
- Ichneutica maya (Hudson, 1898)

Synonyms
- Melanchra maya Hudson, 1898; Graphania maya (Hudson, 1898)

= Ichneutica maya =

Species of moth

Ichneutica maya (also known as the alpine treasure owlet) is a moth of the family Noctuidae. It is endemic to New Zealand. It is found in the mountains in southern half of the North Island and in the South Island. I. maya is a distinctively coloured and patterned moth and as such is unlikely to be confused with similar species. I. maya can be found in the southern half of the North Island down through the South Island. This species can be found in alpine to subalpine zones with high rainfall but in Southland this species can be found down to sea level. This life history in the wild is unknown, nor has its larval host species been confirmed. Adults are on the wing from December to March and are attracted to sugar and light traps.

== Taxonomy ==
This species was first described by George Hudson in 1898 from a specimen collected on Mount Arthur and named Melanchra maya. The male holotype specimen is held at the Museum of New Zealand Te Papa Tongarewa. In 1988 J. S. Dugdale placed this species into the Graphania genus. In 2019 Robert Hoare undertook a major review of New Zealand Noctuidae. During this review the genus Ichneutica was greatly expanded and the genus Graphania was subsumed into that genus as a synonym. As a result of this review, this species is now known as Ichneutica maya.

== Description ==
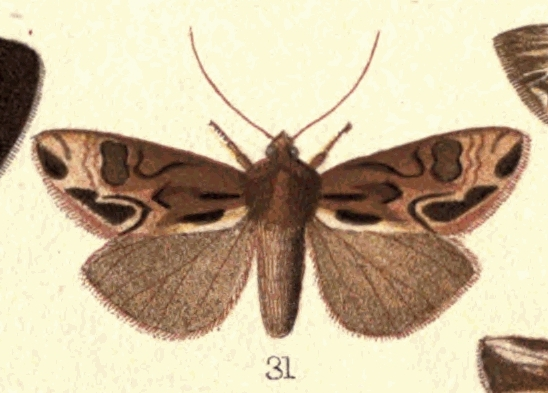
Drawing by George Hudson of a female I. maya

Hudson described the species as follows:

The expansion of the wings is 1 5/8 inches. The fore-wings are bright yellowish-brown, paler towards the apex; there are two broad, shaded, black stripes at the base, one near the middle edged with yellow above, and one below the middle edged with yellow beneath; the orbicular is oval, oblique, edged with black except towards the costa : the claviform is rather irregular, dark purplish-brown : the reniform is very large, dark purplish-brown edged with black; there is a large elongate patch of very dark brown at the tornus, partly edged first with yellow and thru with black; another smaller patch is situated on the termen near the middle, bisected by a tine yellow line. The hind-wings are grey; the cilia of all the wings are yellowish-brown. The head and thorax are purplish-brown, the abdomen dull brownish-grey.

I. maya is a distinctively coloured and patterned moth and as such is unlikely to be confused with similar species. The adult male of this species has a wingspan of between 37 and 43 mm and the female has a wingspan of between 37 and 43 mm.

== Distribution ==
It is endemic to New Zealand. This species is found in the mountains in southern half of the North Island and in the South Island.

== Habitat ==
This species can be found in alpine to subalpine locations with high rainfall, although in Southland this species can be found down at sea level.

== Behaviour ==
The adults of this species are on the wing from December to March. Adults are attracted to both sugar and light traps and have been witnessed feeding on Hebe blossom.

== Life history and host species ==
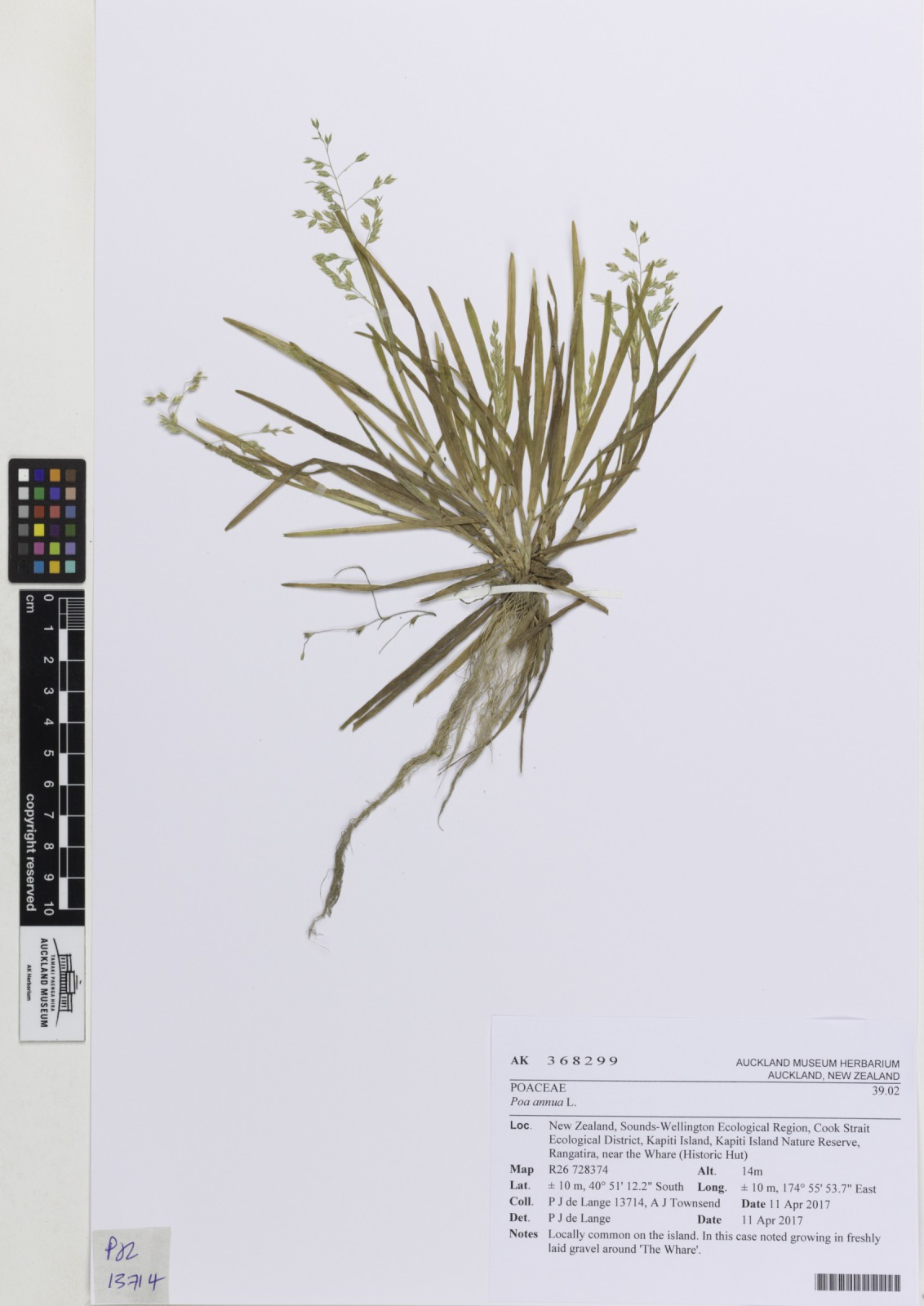
Poa annua, a species used to rear larvae of I. maya

This life history in the wild of this species is unknown, nor has its larval host species been confirmed. However Brian Patrick has attempted to rear this species from egg. He fed the larvae on plant species in genus Luzula and on Poa annua. Patrick describes the eggs of this species as being light green in colour and laid in a group, and the larvae as having a bright green colour with the upper side of the caterpillar being smeared with a grey pattern and a white line on the side of the body. Patrick was unsuccessful in rearing the larvae to adulthood.
