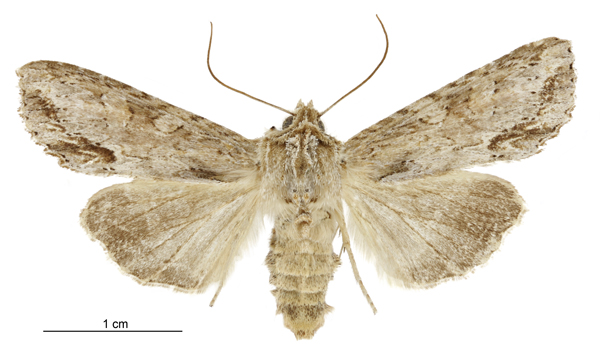
- Female
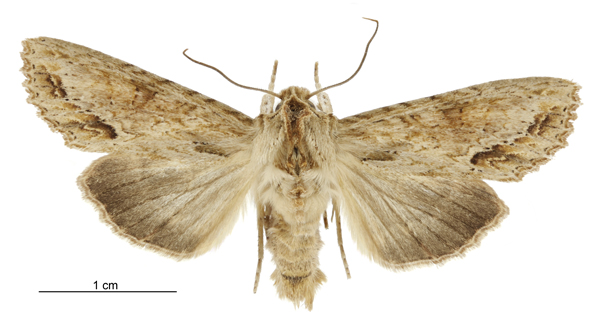
- Male

Scientific classification
- Kingdom: Animalia
- Phylum: Arthropoda
- Clade: Pancrustacea
- Class: Insecta
- Order: Lepidoptera
- Superfamily: Noctuoidea
- Family: Noctuidae
- Genus: Ichneutica
- Species: I. mollis

Binomial name
- Ichneutica mollis (Howes, 1908)

Synonyms
- Melanchra molis Howes, 1908; Melanchra mollis (Howes, 1908); Morrisonia mollis Howes, 1912; Graphania mollis (Howes, 1908); Graphania molis (Howes, 1908); Maoria molis (Howes, 1908)

= Ichneutica mollis =

Species of moth

Ichneutica mollis is a moth of the family Noctuidae. It is endemic to New Zealand and is found from the Coromandel peninsular and Mount Te Aroha southwards including in the South and Stewart Islands. It lives in a variety of habitats including mountainous beech forest, podocarp forest and also grasslands. The larvae feed on grasses and herbs. The adults of this species are on the wing from October to March and are attracted to light and feed on blossoms.

== Taxonomy ==
It was described by George Howes in 1908 from specimens collected in and around Otago and Southland and originally named Melanchra molis. The male lectotype specimen is held at the Museum of New Zealand Te Papa Tongarewa. In 1988 J. S. Dugdale placed this species within the Graphania genus. When doing so Dugdale suggested that Howes intended the spelling of the species name to be mollis. In 2019 Robert Hoare undertook a major review of New Zealand Noctuidae. During this review the genus Ichneutica was greatly expanded and the genus Graphania was subsumed into that genus as a synonym. Hoare also addressed the spelling of the species name, stating that as mollis is "in the prevailing usage and is attributed to the publication of the original spelling" under Article 33.3.1 of the International Code of Zoological Nomenclature this name is to be treated as the correct spelling. As a result of this review, this species is now known as Ichneutica mollis.

== Description ==
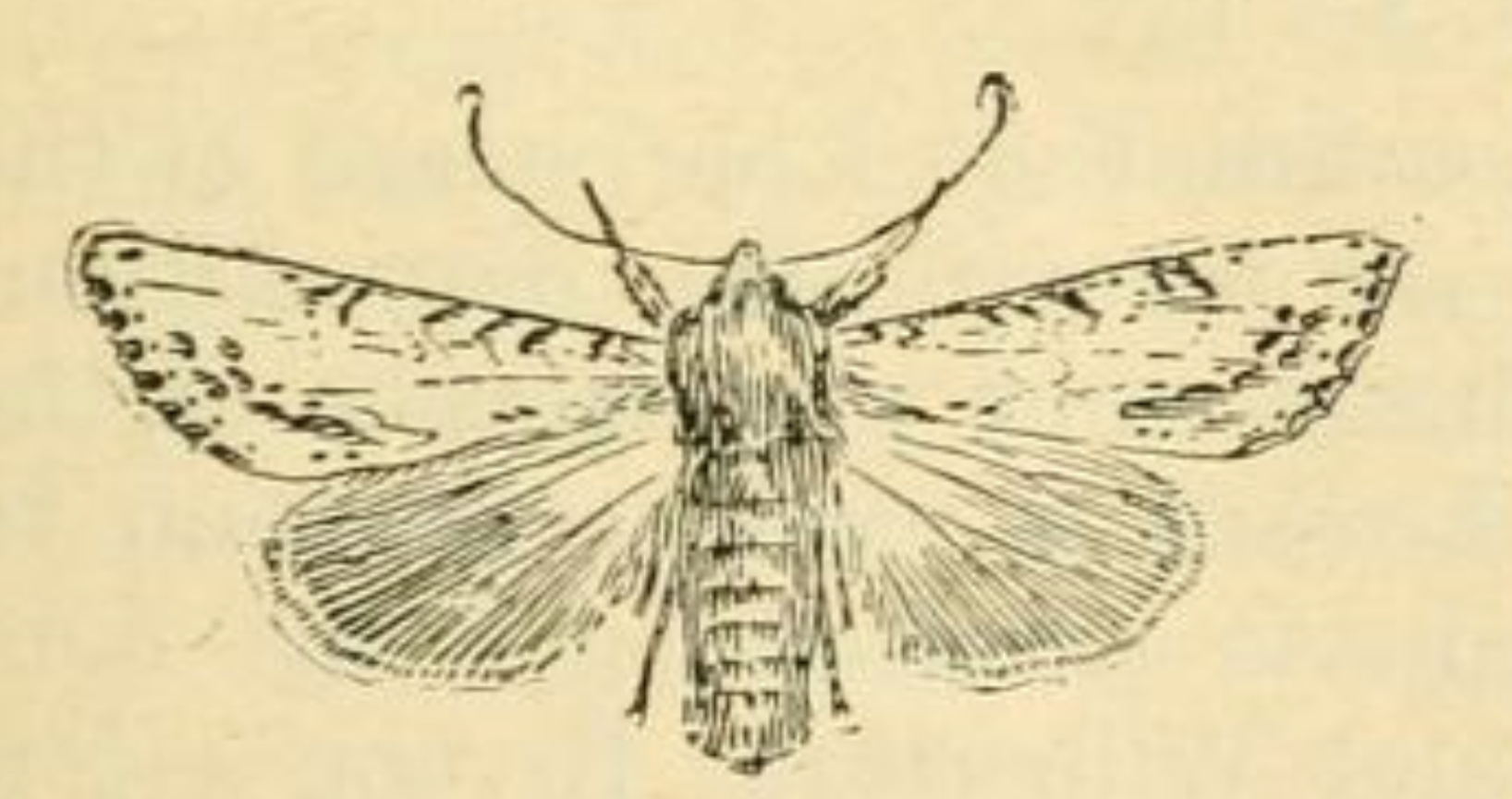
Original description illustration of Melanchra molis

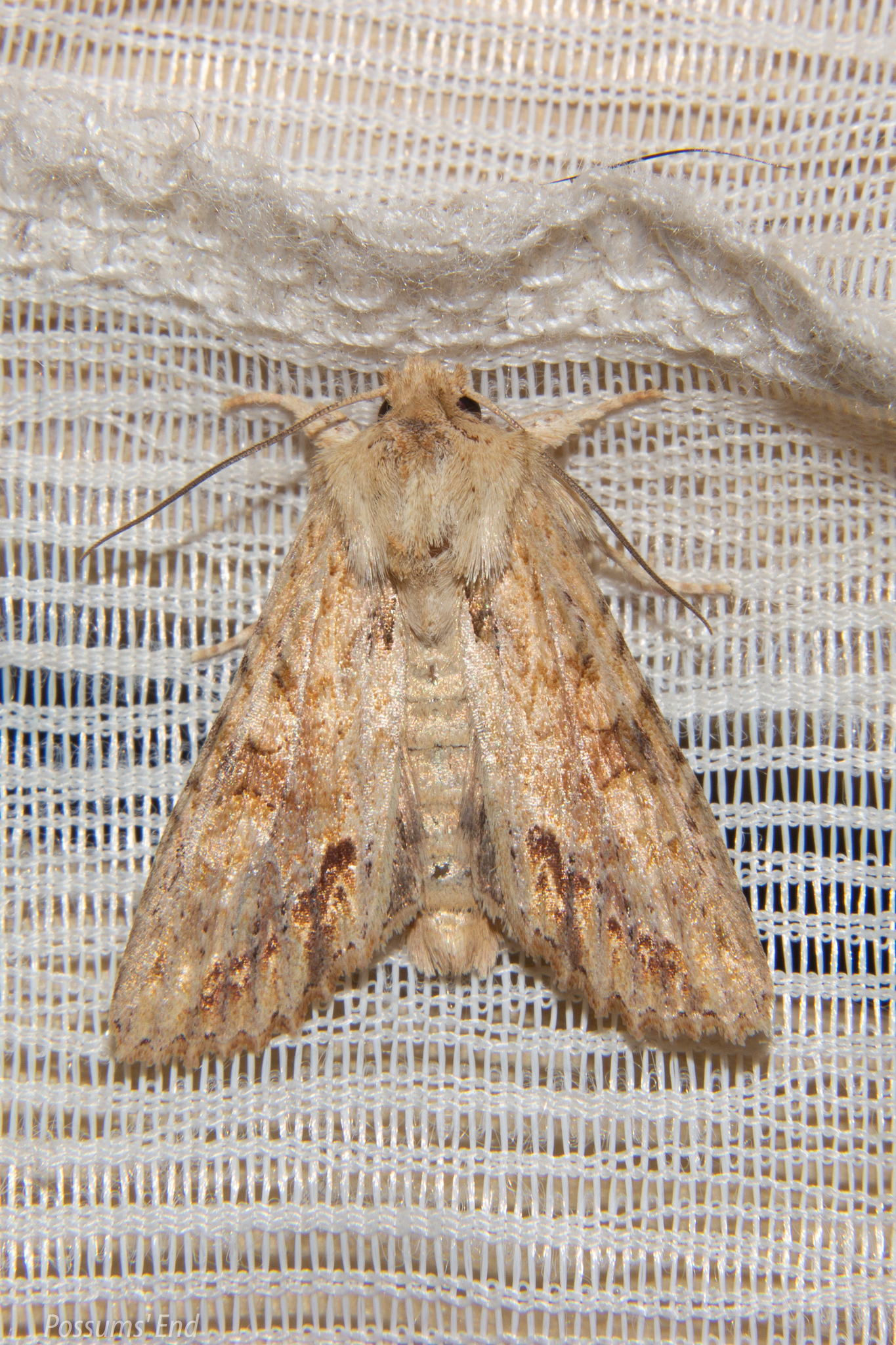
Observation of living moth Ichneutica mollis

Howes originally described this species as follows:

Five specimens, varying from 30 mm. to 36 mm. Antennae ochreous, filiform. Legs and palpi light-ochreous. Thorax strongly crested, crest outlined in light-brown. Abdomen ochreous; in one specimen reddish-ochreous. Forewings light-ochreous; all markings delicately shaded in reddish-brown. Reniform hardly shown, but shaded, especially towards base, with reddish-brown. Seven short distinct marks from base to 3/4 along costa. A jagged transverse line near termen, inclining towards centre of wing as it nears dorsum. Edge of termen deeply scalloped. Cilia light-brown. Hind-wings ochreous, with strong darker terminal suffusion. Cilia ochreous.

The wingspan of the male of this species is between 34 and 43 mm and for the female of the species is between 38 and 42 mm. I. mollis has pale coloured forewings that are narrow and has dark scaling along the inner edge of the subterminal line that is distinctive.

== Distribution ==
It is endemic to New Zealand. this species can be found in the North Island from the Coromandel peninsular and Mount Te Aroha southwards, in the South Island and in Stewart Island.

== Habitat ==
This species lives in a variety of habitats including mountainous beech forest, podocarp forest and also grasslands.

== Life history and host species ==
The larvae of I. mollis feed on grasses and herbs.

== Behaviour ==
The adults of this species are on the wing from October to March. They are attracted to light and have been collected via a mercury vapour light trap. Howes reports seeing them feed on blossoms.
