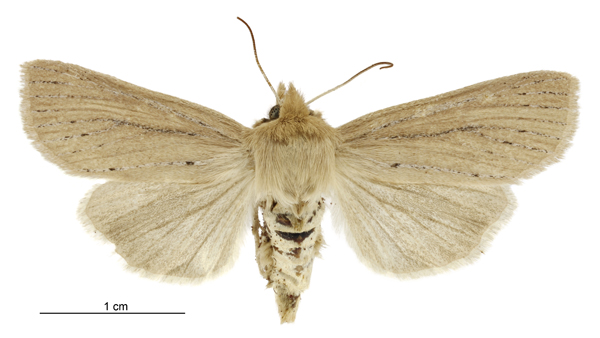
- Female
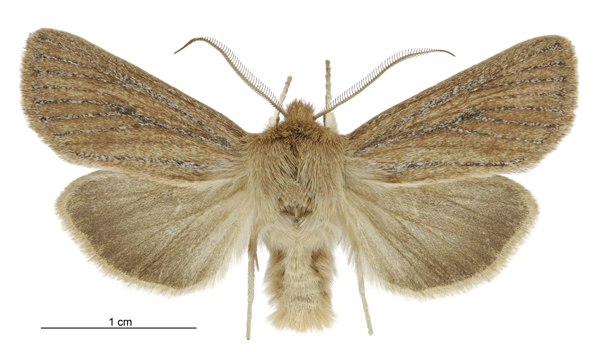
- Male

Scientific classification
- Kingdom: Animalia
- Phylum: Arthropoda
- Clade: Pancrustacea
- Class: Insecta
- Order: Lepidoptera
- Superfamily: Noctuoidea
- Family: Noctuidae
- Genus: Ichneutica
- Species: I. lissoxyla

Binomial name
- Ichneutica lissoxyla (Meyrick, 1911)

Synonyms
- Leucania lissoxyla Meyrick, 1911; Tmetolophota lissoxyla (Meyrick, 1911); Graphania lissoxyla (Meyrick, 1911)

= Ichneutica lissoxyla =

Species of moth

Ichneutica lissoxyla is a moth of the family Noctuidae. It is endemic to New Zealand. It is found in the central and southern parts of the North Island and in most parts of the South Island. The species prefers snowgrass habitat in the alpine zone. I. lissoxyla is similar in appearance to I. paraxysta but can be distinguished as I. lissoxyla lack the black streaks on the forewings that can be found on the latter species and the male I. lissoxyla also has longer pectinations on antennae. The life history of this species is unknown as are the host species of its larvae. Adults are on the wing from January to April and are attracted to the light.

== Taxonomy ==
I. lissoxyla was first described by Edward Meyrick in 1911 from a specimen collected on the Mount Arthur tableland and obtained from George Hudson. Meyrick originally named the species Leucania lissoxyla. The holotype specimen is held at the Natural History Museum, London. In 1988 J. S. Dugdale, in his catalogue of New Zealand Lepidoptera, placed this species within the Tmetolophota genus. In 2019 Robert Hoare undertook a major review of New Zealand Noctuidae species. During this review the genus Ichneutica was greatly expanded and the genus Tmetolophota was subsumed into that genus as a synonym. As a result of this review, this species is now known as Ichneutica lissoxyla.

== Description ==
Meyrick described this species as follows:

♂. 38 mm. Head light brown. Antennal shaft grey, becoming whitish towards base, pectinations a 4, b3, terminating bristles minute. Thorax clothed with hairs, pale ochreous, more brownish anteriorly. Abdomen whitish-ochreous. Forewings elongate-triangular, apex rounded-obtuse, termen rounded, rather oblique; light brown; vein 1b, upper and lower margins of cell, and veins 2-4, 6-8, and apical third of vein 5 marked with lines of mixed blackish and whitish scales; faint streaks of pale-ochreous suffusion beneath cell and between veins 5 and 6 : cilia pale ochreous, tinged with brownish towards base, tips whitish. Hind wings grey; cilia whitish-ochreous, tips whitish.

I. lissoxyla is similar in appearance to I. paraxysta but lack some of the black streaks on the forewings and the male I. lissoxyla has longer pectinations on the antennae. The male of the species has a wingspan of between 33 and 37 mm and the female wingspan is between 31.5 and 39 mm.

== Distribution ==
This species is endemic to New Zealand. This species is found in the central and southern parts of the North Island and in most districts of the South Island.

== Habitat ==
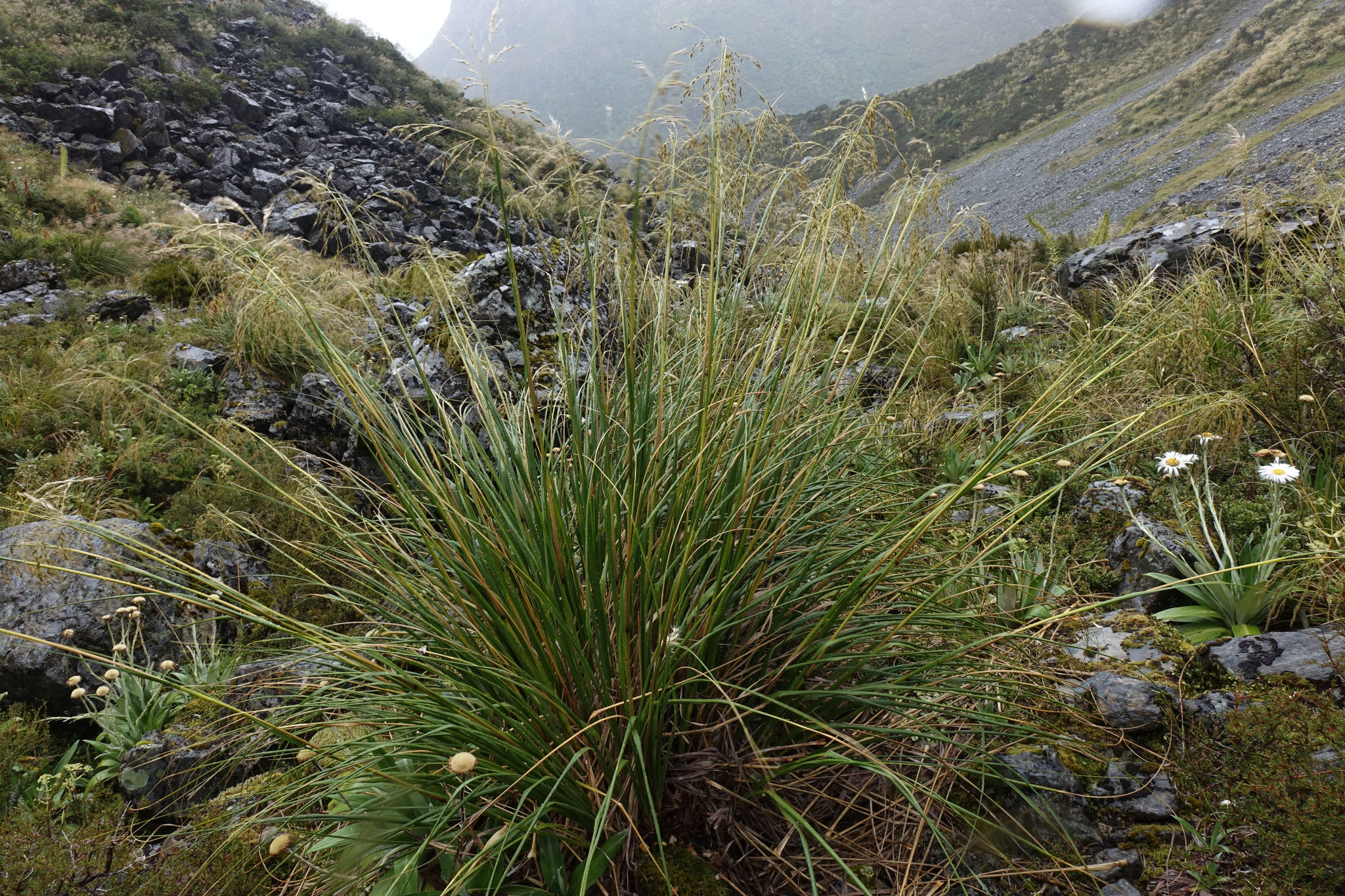
Alpine snowgrass habitat favoured by I. lissoxyla

It is an alpine species which is common and widespread in good snowgrass in the alpine zone.

== Behaviour ==
The adults of this species are on the wing from January to April. Adults of this species are attracted to light.

== Life history and host species ==
The life history of this species is unknown as are the host species of its larvae.
