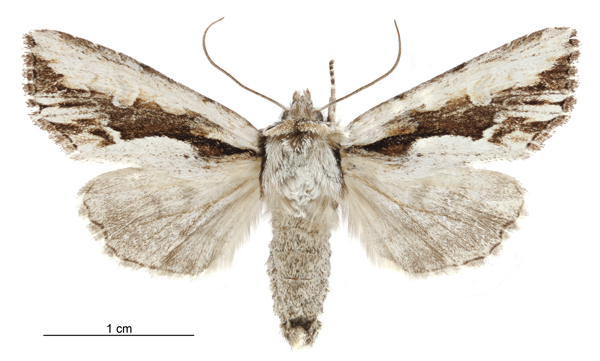
- Female
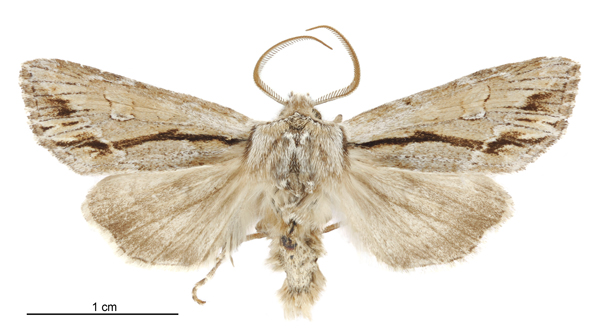
- Male

Scientific classification
- Kingdom: Animalia
- Phylum: Arthropoda
- Clade: Pancrustacea
- Class: Insecta
- Order: Lepidoptera
- Superfamily: Noctuoidea
- Family: Noctuidae
- Genus: Ichneutica
- Species: I. paracausta

Binomial name
- Ichneutica paracausta (Meyrick, 1887)

Synonyms
- Mamestra paracausta Meyrick, 1887; Graphania paracausta (Meyrick, 1887); Melanchra paracausta (Meyrick, 1887)

= Ichneutica paracausta =

Species of moth

Ichneutica paracausta is a moth of the family Noctuidae. This species is endemic to New Zealand. It is found locally in the central North Island, is widespread in the South Island and can also be found in Stewart Island. I. paracausta is variable in colour, but as it has a distinctive black streak on its forewing as well as a wing pattern that is characteristic, I. paracausta is unlikely to be confused with other species. It is present on the North Island volcanic plateau as well as Little Bush Reserve in Hawkes Bay in the North Island as well as in tussock grassland, alpine and subalpine shrubland and in alpine forest. Larvae have been recorded as feeding on grasses, a pupa has been found in a cocoon under the bark of a tree and adult moths are on the wing from October to January.

== Taxonomy ==
This species was first described by Edward Meyrick in 1887 using two specimens collected at Castle Hill by John Davies Enys. Meyrick originally named the species Mamestra paracausta. The lectotype is held at the Canterbury Museum. In 1988 J. S. Dugdale, in his catalogue on New Zealand lepidoptera, placed this species within the Graphania genus. In 2019 Robert Hoare undertook a major review of New Zealand Noctuidae species. During this review the genus Ichneutica was greatly expanded and the genus Graphania was subsumed into that genus as a synonym. As a result of this review, this species is now known as Ichneutica paracausta.

== Description ==
Alfred Philpott described the larva of this species as follows:

Length, 13 lines; dull whitish; dorsal line of indistinct darker colour; subdorsal very faint; lateral stripe more pronounced; many minute specks of colour; head pale-brownish, with darker markings; dorsal surface of first thoracic segment darker.

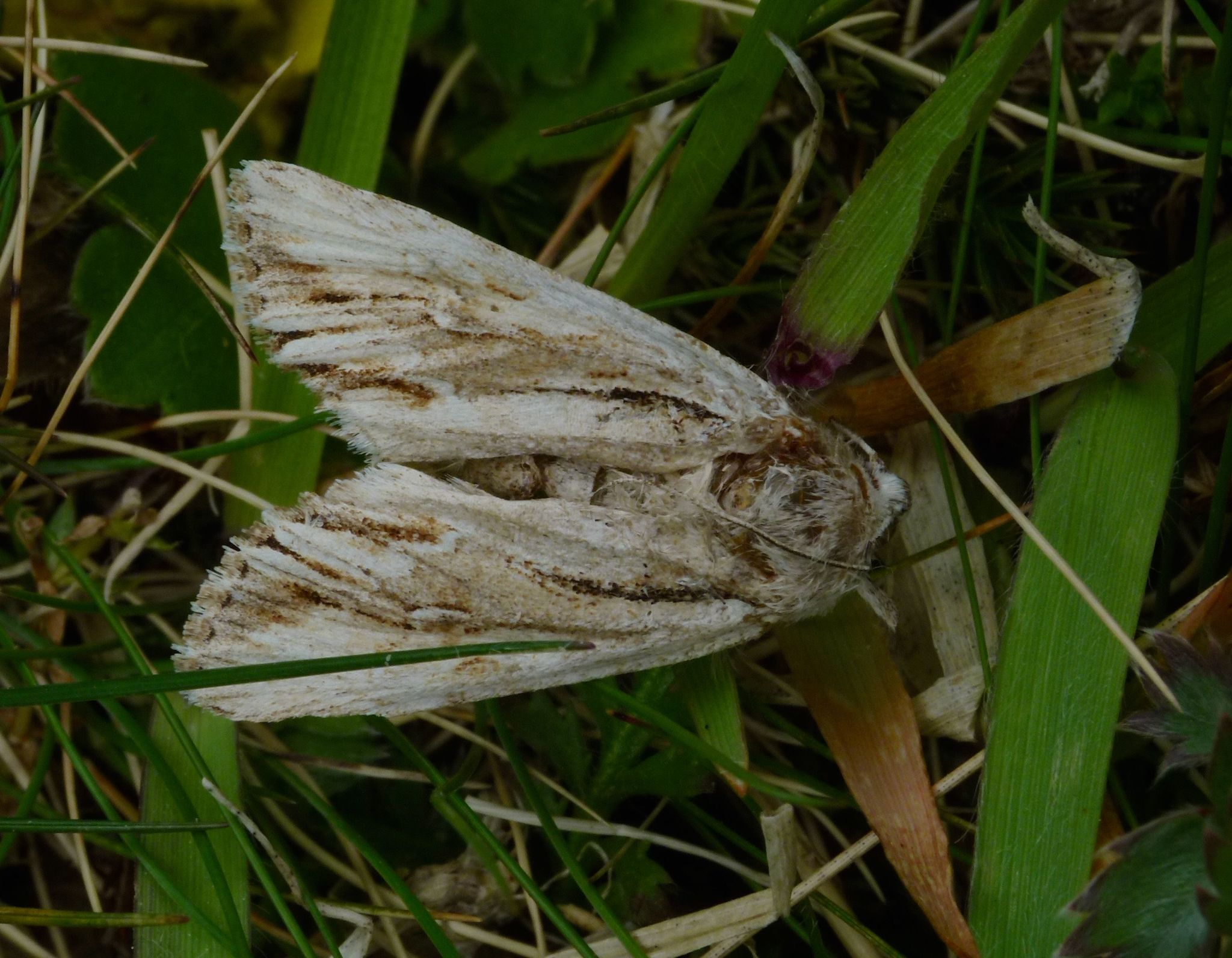
Male Ichneutica paracausta observed in grass

Meyrick described the adult of this species as follows:

Male, female. — 37 mm. Head whitish, mixed with reddish-ochreous above, with two blackish transverse lines on face. Palpi whitish, externally somewhat mixed with reddish-ochreous and black. Antennae whitish, in male moderately pectinated. Thorax and abdomen grey mixed with white and black, collar mixed with reddish-ochreous, and with a transverse blackish line, outer edge of patagia blackish. Legs ochreous-whitish, suffusedly mixed with blackish. Forewings moderately dilated, costa slightly sinuate, apex obtuse, hindmargin waved, rather oblique, rounded beneath; pale ochreous, towards costa irrorated with dark fuscous and whitish, in female more whitish; lines slender, dentate, obscure, dark fuscous; first anteriorly whitish-margined, second posteriorly white-margined on lower half; spots hardly perceptible; a slender black sinuate streak from base to middle, margined beneath rather broadly with dark ochreous-brown to first line, terminating beneath a rather broad posteriorly dilated dark ochreous-brown discal patch extending from first to second line, between which and inner margin the ground-colour is irrorated with white; the discal dark patch is continued beyond second line to hindmargin, where it is dilated and extends over lower 3/4, becoming blackish-fuscous, cut on veins 3 and 4 by light streaks terminating in whitish arrow-headed spots extending into cilia, and containing a double whitish mark on anal angle : cilia pale ochreous mixed with whitish and dark fuscous. Hindwings dark grey mixed with white; an irregular obscurely marked darker post-median line; a dark fuscous interrupted hind-marginal line; cilia whitish mixed with grey.

The wingspan of the adult male of I. paracausta is between 33 and 38 mm and the female wingspan is between 36 and 42 mm. This species is variable in colour, but as it has a distinctive black streak on its forewing as well as a wing pattern that is characteristic, I. paracausta is unlikely to be confused with other species.

== Distribution ==
This species is endemic to New Zealand. I. paracausta is found locally in the central North Island, is widespread in the South Island and can also be found in Stewart Island. I. paracausta can be found down to sea level in Southland.

== Habitat ==
This species is known from the North Island volcanic plateau as well as in Little Bush Reserve in the Hawkes Bay as well as in tussock grassland, alpine and subalpine shrubland and in alpine forest in the South Island.

== Behaviour ==
This species is on the wing from October to January. Adults are attracted to light and have been collected via a mercury vapour light trap.

== Life history and host species ==
Knowledge about the life history of this species needs to be increased. Larvae have been recorded as feeding on various grasses. Pupa have been found in a slight cocoon under the bark of a tree.
