= Ichneutica prismatica =

Scientific classification
- Kingdom: Animalia
- Phylum: Arthropoda
- Clade: Pancrustacea
- Class: Insecta
- Order: Lepidoptera
- Superfamily: Noctuoidea
- Family: Noctuidae
- Genus: Ichneutica
- Species: I. prismatica

Binomial name
- Ichneutica prismatica Hoare, 2019

Species of moth

Ichneutica prismatica is a moth of the family Noctuidae. This species is endemic to New Zealand. The species is ochreous coloured with distinctive pale streaks on its forewings and a white fringe on its hindwings. It is similar in appearance to I. paraxysta but I. prismatica is smaller, lighter bodied and has narrower wings. Also I. prismatica can only be found in the South Island where as I. paraxysta is only known from the North Island. I. prismatica has mainly been collected in the Central Otago region but has also been recorded in the Otago Lakes and the wider Dunedin regions. It inhabits tussock grasslands and wetlands. The life history of this species is unknown but the larval host species are found in the genus Chionochloa. Adults are on the wing in December and January and have been recorded as flying during the day.

== Taxonomy ==
This species was first described by Robert Hoare in 2019. The male holotype specimen was collected at the Lammermoor Range in Central Otago by the Patrick family and is held at the Otago Museum.

== Description ==
The adult male wingspan is between 30.5 and 36 mm and for the adult female is between 32 and 37 mm. This species has an ochreous base colour and then distinctive pale streaks to its forewings. It is unlikely to be confused with similar species within its range but is visually similar to the North Island species I. paraxysta. However I. prismatica is smaller, lighter bodied and has narrower wings. Another difference is that the fringe on the hindwings are coloured white with I. prismatica but are a darker brownish white with I. paraxysta.

== Distribution ==
This species is endemic to New Zealand. This species can mainly be found in the Central Otago district but has also been collected around the Otago Lakes and Dunedin region and at Mount Prospect.

== Habitat ==
This species inhabits tussock grasslands and wetlands.

== Behaviour ==
The adults of this species are on the wing in December and January. This moth can be found flying during daylight hours.

== Life history and host species ==
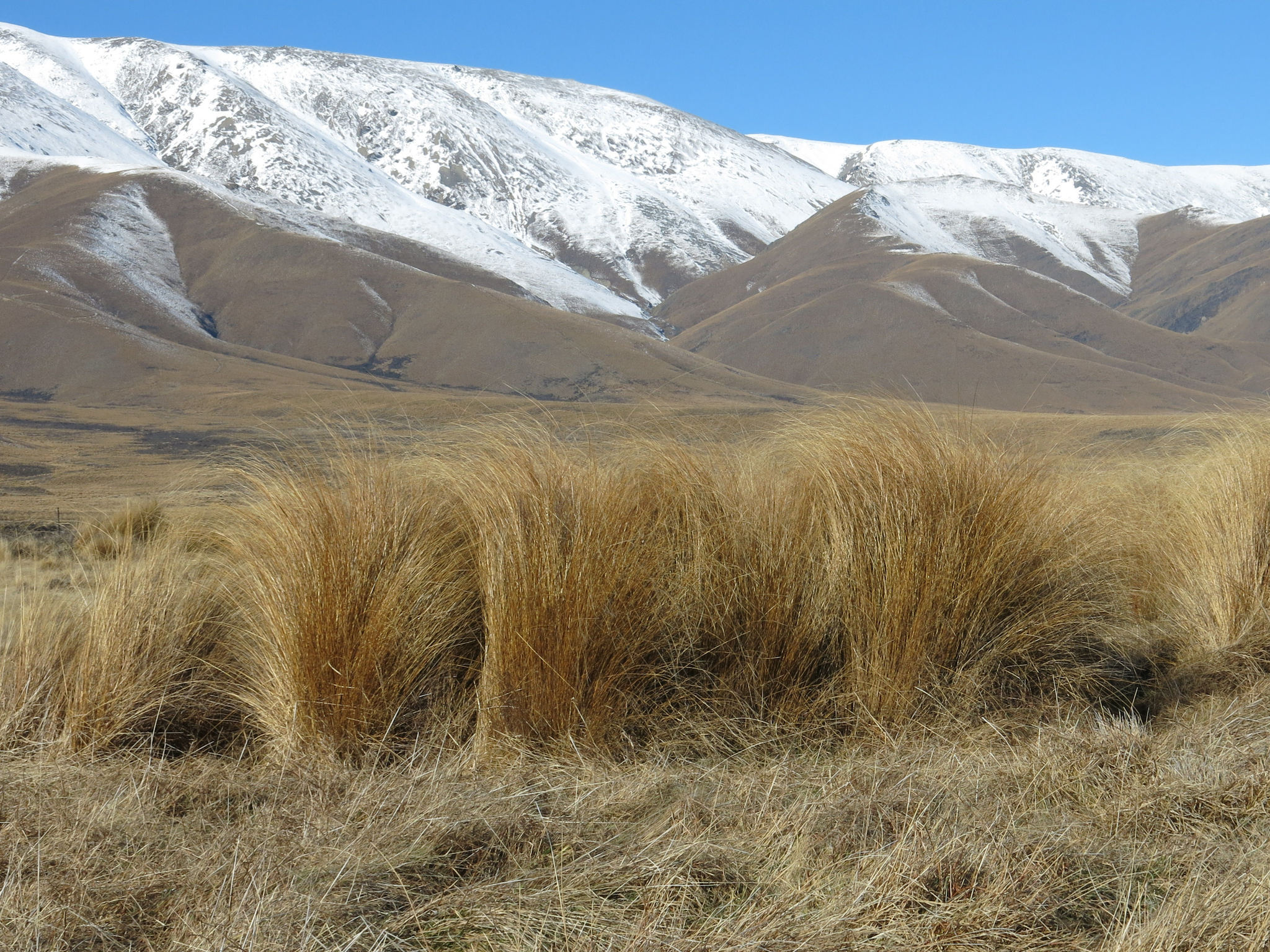
Chionochloa rubra, a likely host species of I. prismatica, in the Central Otago region.

The life history of this species is unknown but the larval host species are found in the genus Chionochloa.
