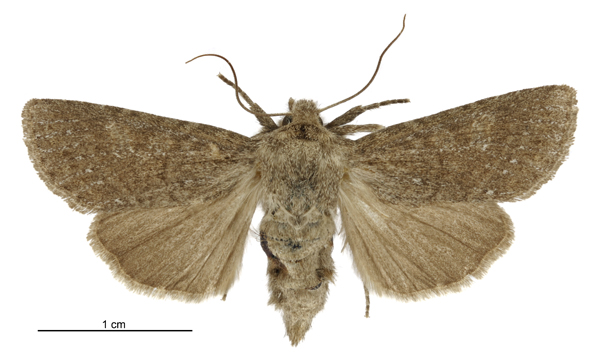
- Female
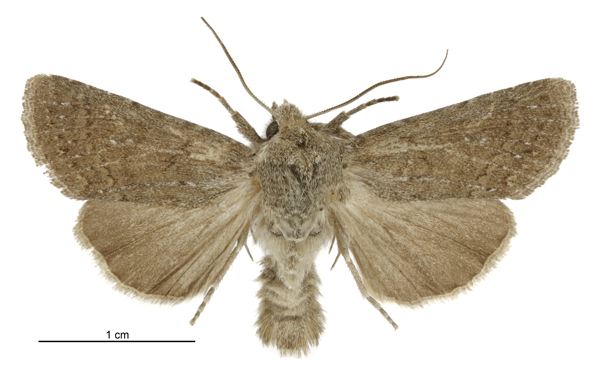
- Male

Scientific classification
- Kingdom: Animalia
- Phylum: Arthropoda
- Clade: Pancrustacea
- Class: Insecta
- Order: Lepidoptera
- Superfamily: Noctuoidea
- Family: Noctuidae
- Genus: Ichneutica
- Species: I. sollennis

Binomial name
- Ichneutica sollennis (Meyrick, 1914)

Synonyms
- Aletia sollennis Meyrick, 1914; Aletia sollenis (Meyrick, 1914)

= Ichneutica sollennis =

Species of moth

Ichneutica sollennis is a moth of the family Noctuidae. This species is endemic to New Zealand. This species is known from the eastern and central areas of the southern South Island. It inhabits alpine zones and has been collected in tussock grasslands. The life history of this species is unknown. Although the host species is currently unknown it has been hypothesised that this species have grass or grass like plants as host plants. Adults are on the wing from November to February and are attracted to light.

== Taxonomy ==
This species was first described by Edward Meyrick in 1914 and named Aletia sollennis. Meyrick used two male specimens collected by George Howes at Waipori in November and January. Howes passed the specimens to Alfred Philpott who in turn passed them to Meyrick. The lectotype specimen is held at the Natural History Museum, London. In 2019 Robert Hoare undertook a major review of New Zealand Noctuidae. During this review the genus Ichneutica was greatly expanded and the genus Aletia was subsumed into that genus as a synonym. As a result of this review, this species is now known as Ichneutica sollennis.

== Description ==
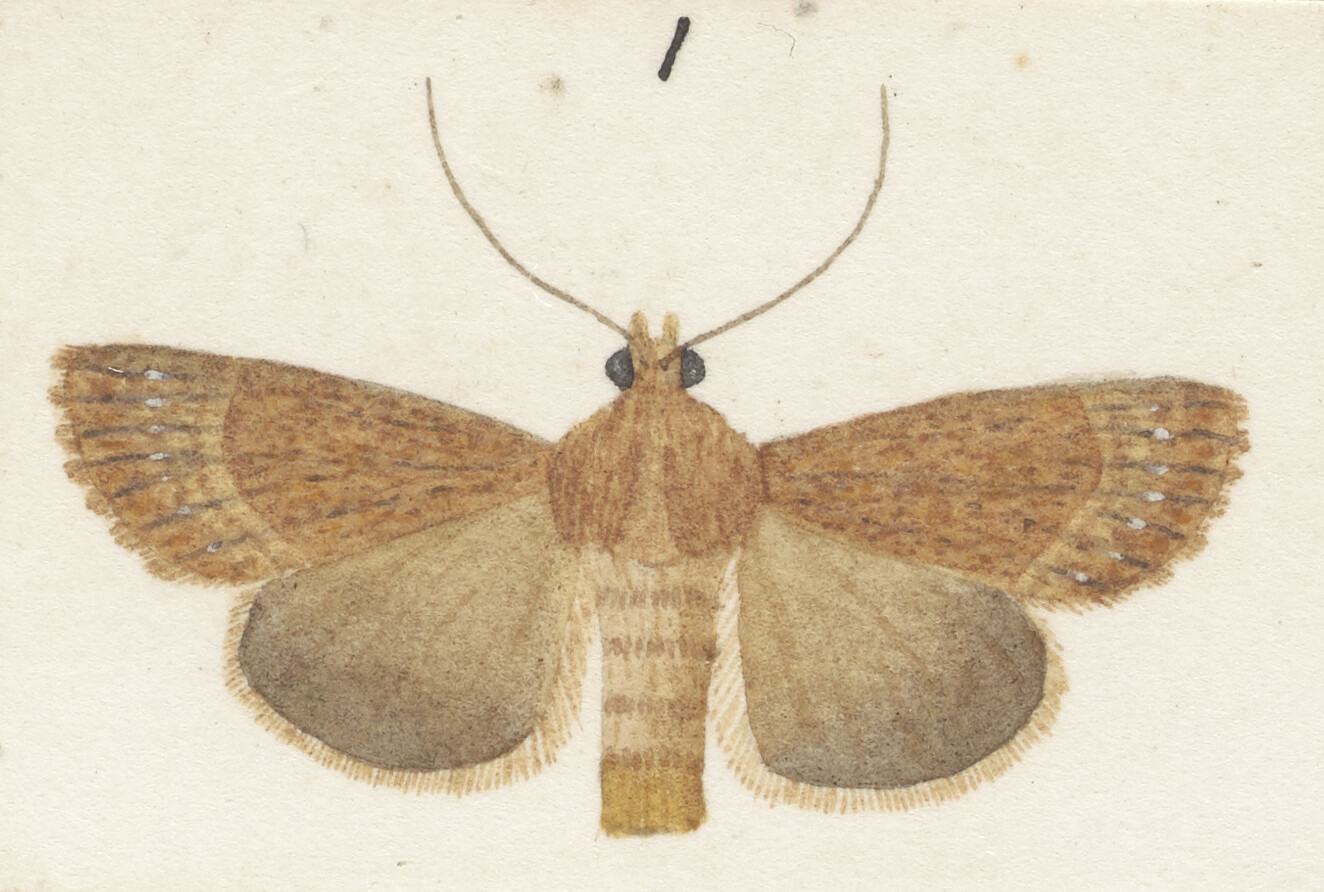
Illustration of male by George Hudson.

Meyrick described this species as follows:

♂. 35 mm. Head and thorax light brownish-ochreous or brownish. Terminal joint of palpi short. Antennae ciliated. Forewings elongate-triangular, costa almost straight, termen rounded, waved, rather oblique; brownish-ochreous, more or less fuscous-tinged; veins obscurely sprinkled with whitish, and posteriorly also with fuscous; margins of reniform faintly indicated with whitish; a curved transverse series of whitish dots on veins at 3/4 each dot preceded and followed by indistinct dark-fuscous dots : cilia light ochreous sprinkled with whitish. Hindwings fuscous, darker towards termen; cilia ochreous-whitish, basal half suffused with fuscous.

I. sollennis has a plain brown shade to its forewing with dark wing veins and white dots across the forewings. The adult male has a wingspan of between 32 and 35 mm and the female has a wingspan of between 32 and 33 mm.

== Distribution ==
This species is endemic to New Zealand. It is found in South Island, in the eastern and central areas of the southern part.

== Habitat ==
This species inhabits alpine zones and has been known to be collected in tussock grasslands.

== Behaviour ==
The adults of this species are on the wing from November to February. Adults of this species are attracted to light.

== Life history and host species ==
The life history of this species is unknown as are the host species of its larvae. Hoare hypothesises that the preferred habitat of this species and shape of I. sollennis' ovipositor suggest that this species have grass or grass like plants as host plants.
