= Ichneutica lyfordi =

Scientific classification
- Kingdom: Animalia
- Phylum: Arthropoda
- Clade: Pancrustacea
- Class: Insecta
- Order: Lepidoptera
- Superfamily: Noctuoidea
- Family: Noctuidae
- Genus: Ichneutica
- Species: I. lyfordi

Binomial name
- Ichneutica lyfordi Hoare, 2019

Species of moth

Ichneutica lyfordi is a moth of the family Noctuidae. This species was named in honour of its first collector, Brian M. Lyford, and is endemic to New Zealand. It is only known from the Von Valley in the Otago Lakes area of the South Island. As at 2021, only the male of the species has been collected. The life history of this species is unknown as are the host species of its larvae. Adults are on the wing in February and are attracted to light.

== Taxonomy ==
I. lyfordi was first described by Robert Hoare in 2019. The male holotype specimen was collected by Brian M. Lyford at White Burn, Von River South Branch in the Otago Lakes region. The male holotype specimen is held in the New Zealand Arthropod Collection. This species was named in honour of Brian M. Lyford.

== Description ==
The wingspan of the adult male is between 39 and 40 mm. The male has long antennal pectinations and has a forewing patterned with dark and light streaks. The female of this species has not yet been collected. The patterns on the forewings ensure that I. lyfordi can be distinguished from its close relative I. acontistis, along with the fact that I. lyfordi is normally larger and broader winged.

== Distribution ==
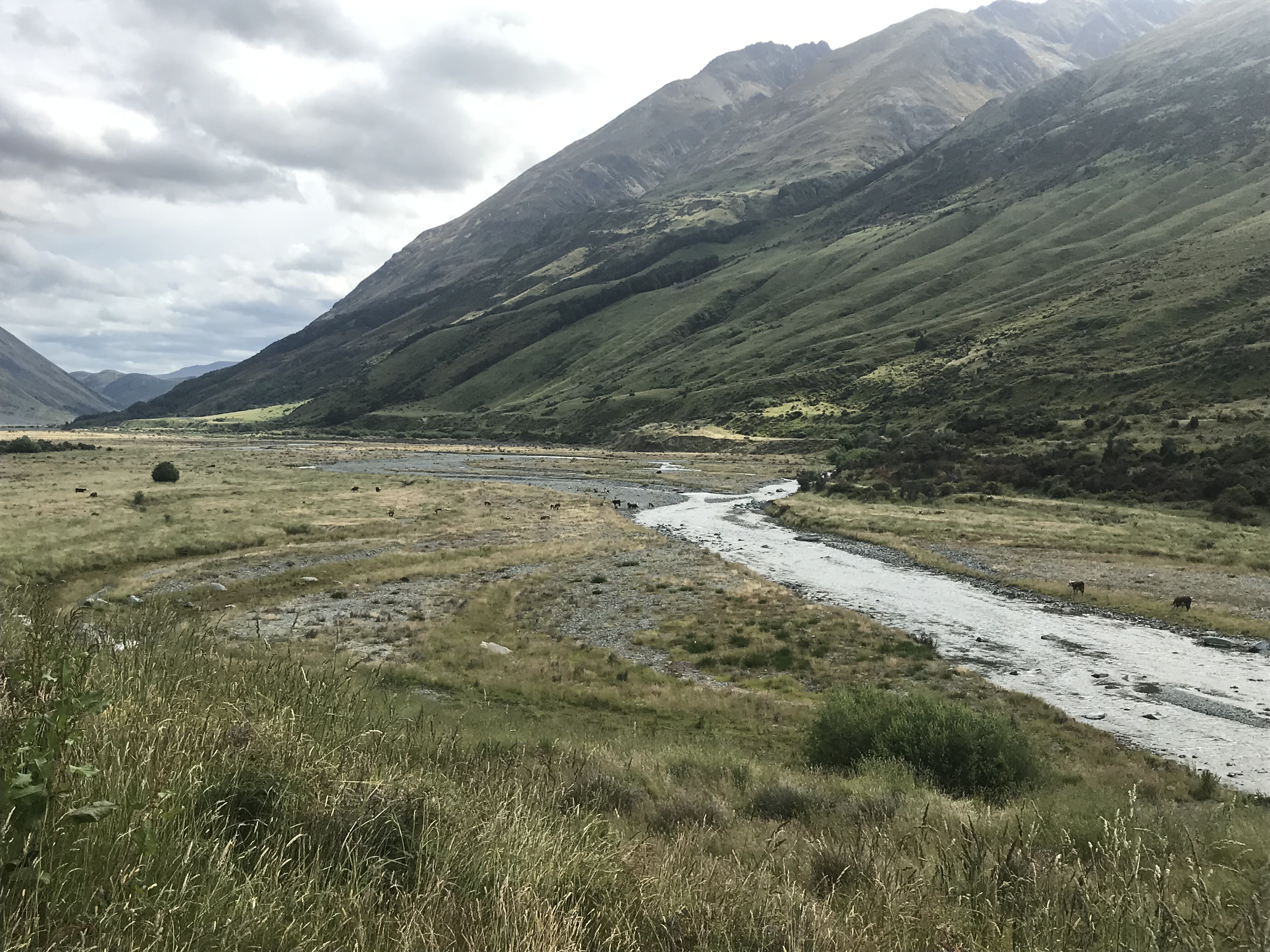
Von Valley, only known locality of I. lyfordi

This species is endemic to New Zealand and is only known from the Von Valley in the Queenstown-Lakes District of the South Island.

== Behaviour ==
Adults of this species are on the wing in February and are attracted to light.

== Life history and host species ==
The life history of this species is unknown as are the host species of its larvae.
