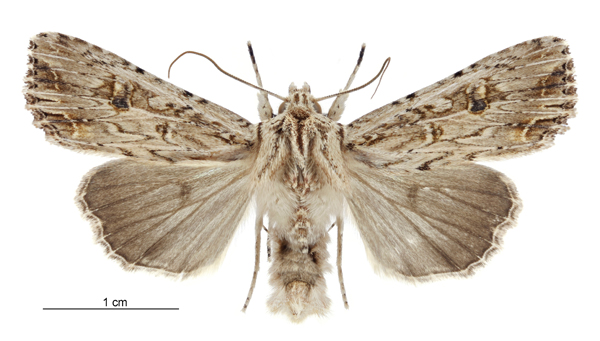
- Male
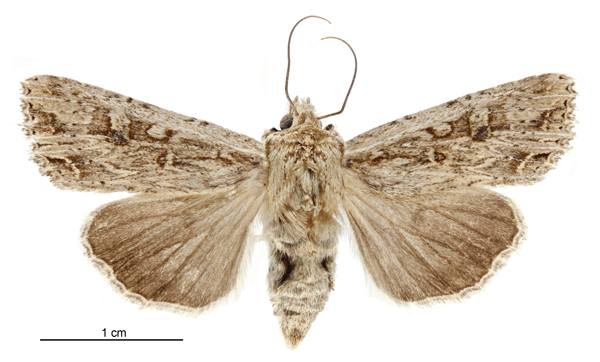
- Female

Scientific classification
- Kingdom: Animalia
- Phylum: Arthropoda
- Clade: Pancrustacea
- Class: Insecta
- Order: Lepidoptera
- Superfamily: Noctuoidea
- Family: Noctuidae
- Genus: Ichneutica
- Species: I. lignana

Binomial name
- Ichneutica lignana (Walker, 1857)

Synonyms
- Hadena lignana Walker, 1857; Melanchra lignana (Walker, 1857); Mamestra lignana (Walker, 1857); Graphania lignana (Walker, 1857)

= Ichneutica lignana =

Species of moth

Ichneutica lignana is a moth of the family Noctuidae. It is endemic to New Zealand. This species is found on the Three Kings Islands as well as the North, South and Stewart Islands. This species lives in a variety of habitats including coastal areas, tussock grasslands, shrublands, and native forest, at a range of altitudes from sea level to over 1300 m. I. lignana is quite distinctive in appearance with its dark markings on the abdomen and forewings although it is possible to confuse Ichneutica morosa, Meterana pansicolor and Meterana pascoi with this species. Adults are on the wing throughout the year in the northern parts of the New Zealand but are restricted to the months of October to April in the more southern parts of the country.

== Taxonomy ==
This species was first described by Francis Walker in 1857 using a male specimen collected by Percy Earl in Waikouaiti. The male holotype specimen is held at the Natural History Museum, London. In 1988 J. S. Dugdale placed this species within the Graphania genus. In 2019 Robert Hoare undertook a major review of New Zealand Noctuidae. During this review the genus Ichneutica was greatly expanded and the genus Graphania was subsumed into that genus as a synonym. As a result of this review, this species is now known as Ichneutica lignana.

== Description ==
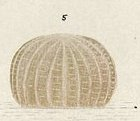
Egg of I. liganana as drawn by George Hudson.

Morris Watt describes the egg of this species as follows:

Hemispherical; top and bottom flattened, and of equal area. Pearly white. In about a week a narrow band of light brown surrounds the egg just above the equator, and a small irregular area of light brown covers the micropyle. Four days later the light brown intensifies to a much darker shade, and the rest of the egg turns a light grey. At this stage the larva can be seen within the egg. Just before hatching the reticulations become white and very distinct.

Hoare described the larva as follows:

Head green, longitudinally striped darker green, paler green below stemmata. Body tapering posteriorly, no hump on A8, bright green; indistinct dorsal line whitishgreen, bordered dark green on each side; conspicuous broader cream subdorsal line bordered dark green above only; area between dorsal and subdorsal stripes with pale marbling arranged into indistinct longitudinal stripes; clear white lateral stripe (on level of spiracles) narrowly bordered darker above, broad whitish green subventral area contiguous with lateral stripe and with some darker green mottling; green below this including bases of prolegs. Pinacula very indistinct, greyish. Thoracic legs translucent greenish. Setae brownish. Spiracles pale ochre brown with black peritremes.

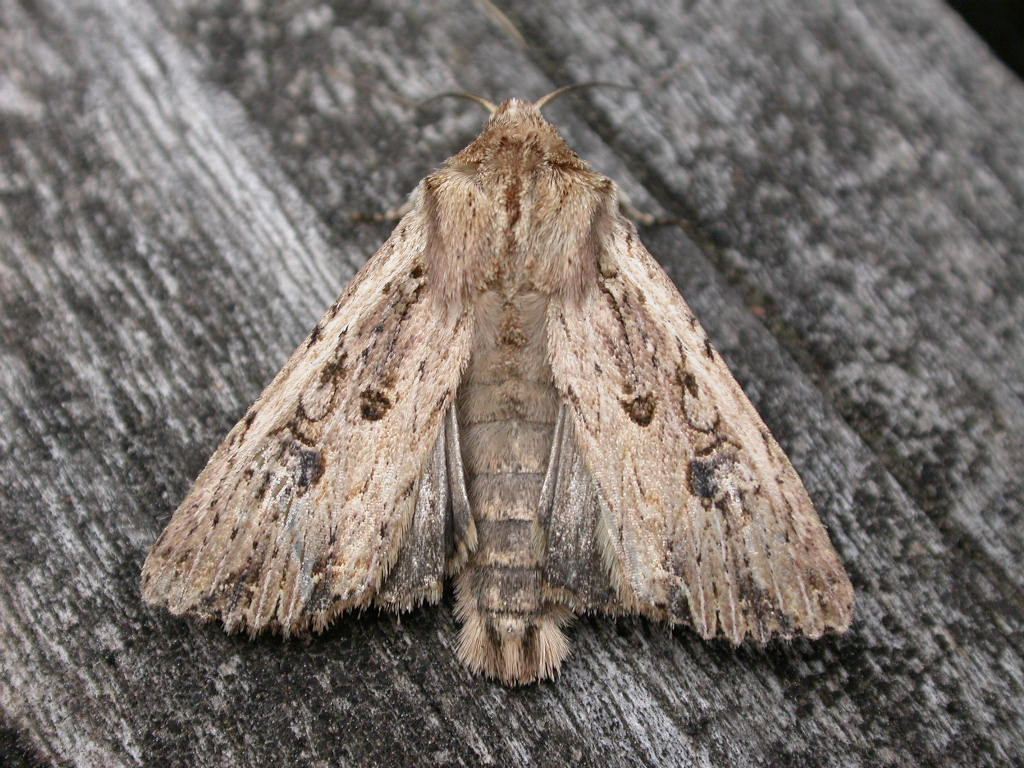
Observation of live Ichneutica lignana

Walker described the adult of this species as follows:

Male. Very pale fawn-colour. Third joint of the palpi not more than one-fourth of the length of the second. Antennae very minutely ciliated. Thorax and abdomen crested. Thorax with slight oblique black stripes, and with two broader humeral stripes. Fore wings slightly streaked with brown towards the base, with three diffuse brown spots on the exterior border, with black marks along the costa, and with black marginal lunules; the three discal spots distinct, with brown borders; orbicular oblong, subfusiform, with a brown streak at its base; reniform not excavated, with a blackish disk; submarginal line pale, irregular, traversing the marginal spots. Hind wings brownish cinereous, with pale cilia. Length of the body 7 lines; of the wings 16 lines.

The wingspan of the adult males are between 32 and 40 mm and the wingspan of the females are between 33 and 39 mm. This species is quite distinctive with its dark markings on the abdomen and forewings. It might possibly be confused with Ichneutica morosa, Meterana pansicolor and Meterana pascoi but I. lignana can be distinguished from these three species as they lack the distinct claviform present on I. lignana forewings.

== Distribution ==
It is endemic to New Zealand. This species is found on the Three Kings Islands as well as the North, South and Stewart Islands.

== Habitat ==
This species lives in a variety of habitats including coastal areas, tussock grasslands, shrublands, and native forest, at a range of altitudes from sea level to over 1300 m.

== Behaviour ==
Adults of this species are on the wing throughout the year in the northern parts of the New Zealand but are restricted to the months of October to April in the more southern parts of the country. They are attracted to light and have been collected via a mercury vapour light trap.

== Life history and host species ==
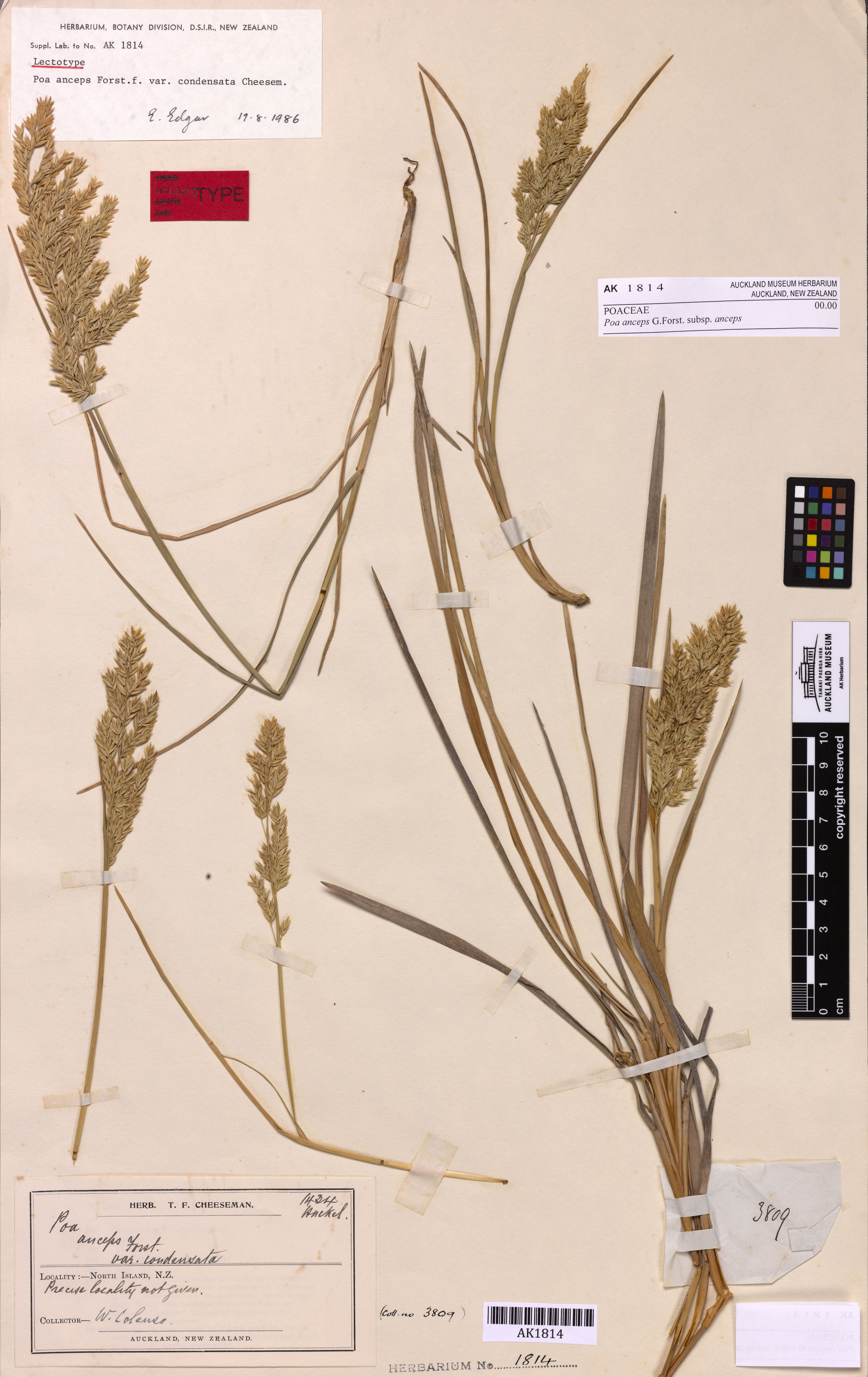
Poa anceps, a larval host of I. lignana

Eggs are laid in November and December and take around eleven days to incubate. A larva of this species was found on Poa anceps and collected in December was successfully reared with the moth emerging in March. This larva pupated in moss. Other larval hosts are the native grasses Poa cita and Festuca novae-zelandiae.
