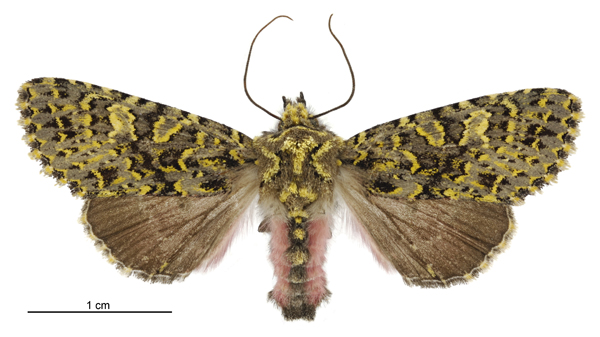
- Female
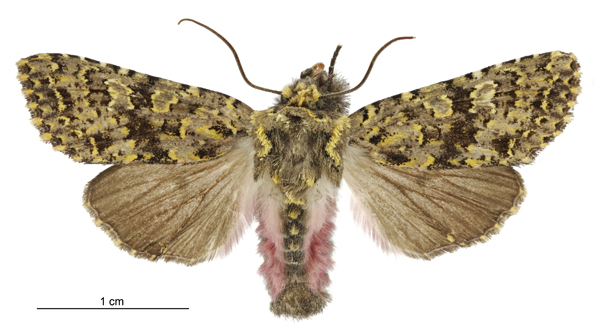
- Male

Scientific classification
- Kingdom: Animalia
- Phylum: Arthropoda
- Clade: Pancrustacea
- Class: Insecta
- Order: Lepidoptera
- Superfamily: Noctuoidea
- Family: Noctuidae
- Genus: Meterana
- Species: M. pictula

Binomial name
- Meterana pictula (White, 1855)

Synonyms
- Dianthaecia pictula White, 1855; Mamestra rhodopleura Meyrick, 1887; Melanchra rhodopleura (Meyrick, 1887)

= Meterana pictula =

Species of moth

Meterana pictula is a moth of the family Noctuidae. It is endemic to New Zealand. This species has been classified as "At Risk, Declining" by the Department of Conservation.

== Taxonomy ==
This species was first described in Richard Taylor's book Te Ika a Maui: or, New Zealand and its inhabitants in 1855. The species name, Dianthoecia pictula, was listed as a caption on the plate that illustrated the moth. Adam White has been regarded as the artist of that plate and, as a result, the species authorship has been attributed to him. However Taylor does not mention White. It has therefore been argued that under the International Code of Zoological Nomenclature Article 50.1.1 Taylor should be attributed as the author of the species. In 1887 Edward Meyrick, thinking he was describing a new species, named this moth Mamestra rhodopleura. In 1898 and in 1928 George Vernon Hudson discussed and illustrated this moth under the name Melanchra rhodopleura. As at 1988 the holotype specimen of this species has not been located.

== Description ==
The larvae of this species measure approximately 38mm long and are bright coloured with a green base colour and red, yellow and white lines. Hudson described the adult moths of this species as follows:

The expansion of the wings is about 1 1/2 inches. The forewings are dark greyish-green with very numerous yellow and black markings, the stigmata and transverse lines being clearly marked by chains of bright yellow and black spots. The hind wings are dark grey, the cilia are also grey with a series of minute yellow dots. The sides of the abdomen are bright crimson.

The adult moths lack the prominent white reniform markings of the South Island species M. meyricci.

== Distribution ==
This species is endemic to New Zealand. It has occurred in Bay of Plenty, Hawkes Bay, Taupō, Wellington, Nelson and Fiordland.

== Live cycle and behaviour ==
The pupa of this species exists in a cocoon that resides underneath the ground. This moth is a summer emerging species. The adult are on the wing in January but can be seen as late as June. Adults of the species are attracted to sugar.

== Host species and habitat ==
The host species for this nocturnal moth are the New Zealand native mat forming and shrubby Pimelea species. M. pictula prefers coastal and alpine open habitats. It can be found in the North Island in coastal, montane, and alpine shrub-land habitat but only in coastal shrub-lands in the South Island.

== Conservation status ==
M. pictula is classified as being "At Risk" and "Declining" by the Department of Conservation threat classification system.
