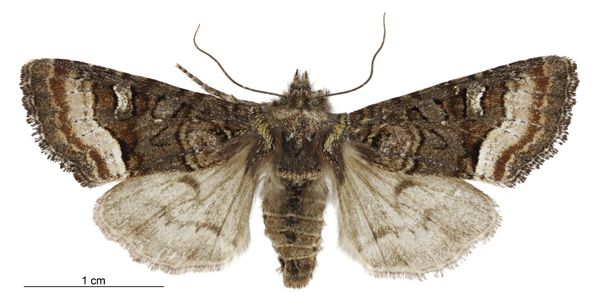
- Female
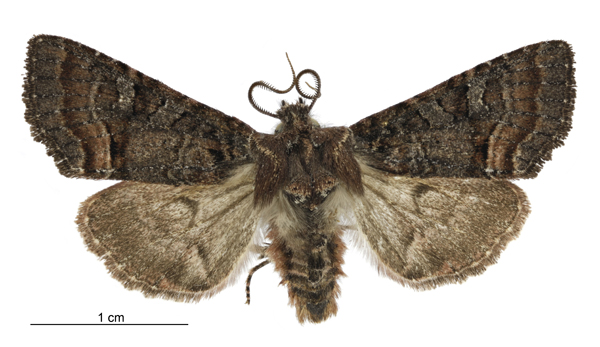
- Male

Scientific classification
- Kingdom: Animalia
- Phylum: Arthropoda
- Class: Insecta
- Order: Lepidoptera
- Superfamily: Noctuoidea
- Family: Noctuidae
- Genus: Meterana
- Species: M. asterope

Binomial name
- Meterana asterope (Hudson, 1898)

Synonyms
- Melanchra asterope Hudson, 1898

= Meterana asterope =

Species of moth endemic to New Zealand

Meterana asterope is a species of moth in the family Noctuidae. This species is endemic to New Zealand and is found in the North and South Islands. It inhabits both native forest and open habitat and adults emerge during the New Zealand summer. Adults are on the wing in December and January. This species is attracted to light and has also been collected via sugar traps.

== Taxonomy ==
This species was first described by George Hudson in 1898 using a female specimen collected in January at the tableland of Mount Arthur at 3600 ft and named Melanchra asterope. In 1928 Hudson discussed and illustrated this species under that name. In 1971 J. S. Dugdale discussed this species suggesting that it might belong within the Erana group. In 1988 J. S. Dugdale placed this species in the genus Meterana. The female holotype is held at Te Papa.

== Description ==
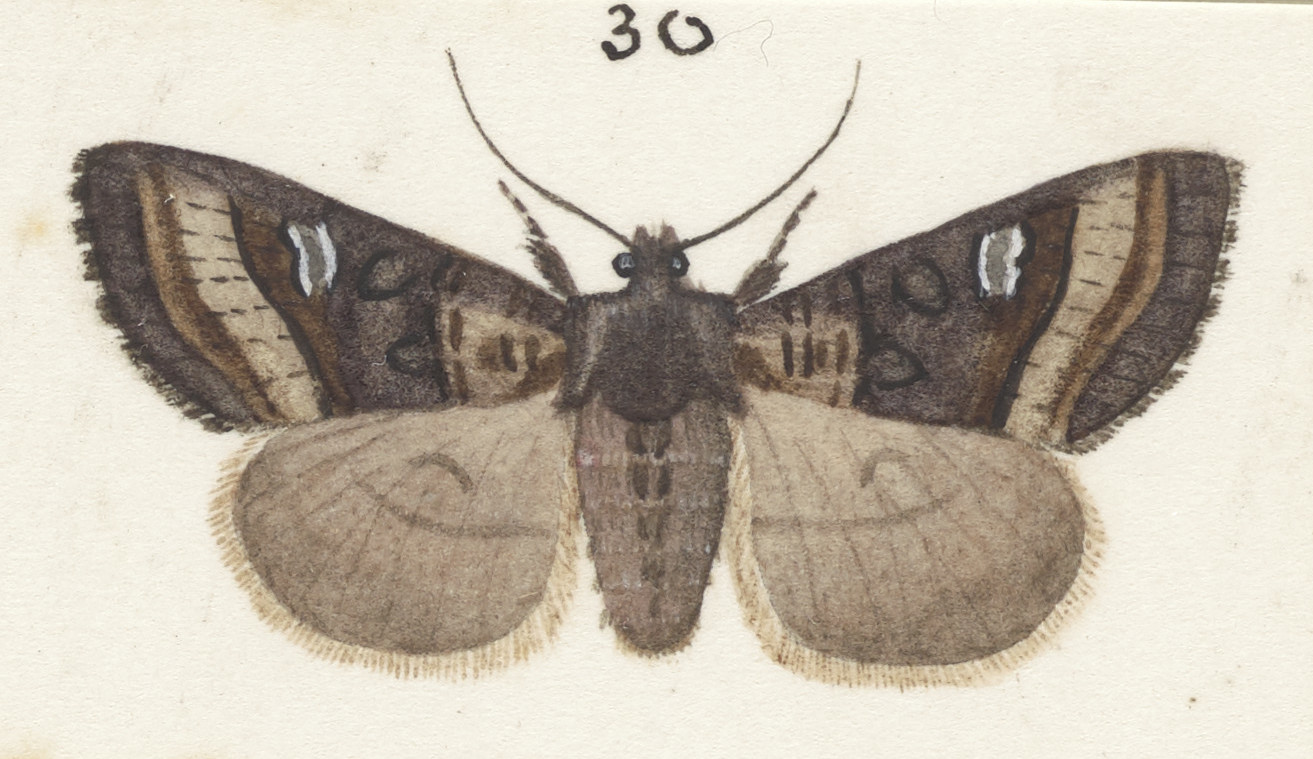
Illustration of a female M. asterope by George Hudson.

Hudson described this species as follows:

The expansion of the wines is 1 5/8 inches. The fore-wings are dull brown with a pale area on the dorsum near the base, and a very broad pale band just before the termen; there is a bmken black-edged transverse line near the base, and a fainter transverse line at about one-third; the orbicular is oblong, the claviform crescentic, and the reniform oblong, white, and very conspicuous, all are strongly outlined in black; there is a shaded transverse line on each side of the broad pale terminal band; the termen is dark brown; the cilia are brown, and the veins are marked in black. The hind-wings are pale grey; there is a rather conspicuous dark crescent in the middle, and two shaded transverse lines; the cilia are grey.

This species is similar in appearance to Meterana dotata.

== Distribution ==
This species is endemic to New Zealand and can be found in both the North and South Islands. It has been collected at locations such as its type locality of Mount Arthur, at Mount Richmond, Bold Peak in Otago, and at the Routeburn Valley.

== Habitat ==
This species inhabits native forest as well as more open habitat at altitudes of between 2500 and 4000 ft.

== Behaviour ==
This species emerges in the New Zealand summer. Adults are on the wing between December and January and are attracted to light. They have also been collected via sugar traps.
