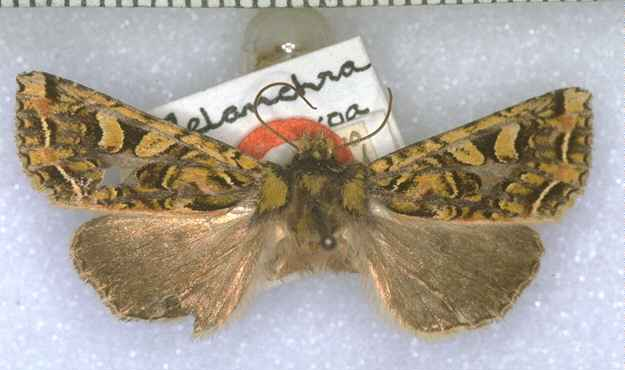
- Female holotype

Conservation status
- Data Deficit (NZ TCS)

Scientific classification
- Kingdom: Animalia
- Phylum: Arthropoda
- Clade: Pancrustacea
- Class: Insecta
- Order: Lepidoptera
- Superfamily: Noctuoidea
- Family: Noctuidae
- Subfamily: Noctuinae
- Genus: Meterana
- Species: M. tetrachroa

Binomial name
- Meterana tetrachroa (Meyrick, 1931)

Synonyms
- Melanchra tetrachroa Meyrick, 1931; Graphania tetrachroa (Meyrick, 1931)

= Meterana tetrachroa =

Species of moth

Meterana tetrachroa is a species of moth of the family Noctuidae. This species is endemic to New Zealand. In 2025 this species was classified as "Data Deficient" by the Department of Conservation.

== Taxonomy ==
It was described by Edward Meyrick in 1931 from a female specimen collected by George Hudson at Tongariro National Park on 6 January 1930 and named Melanchra tetrachroa. Hudson discussed and illustrated this species under that name in his 1939 Supplement to the Butterflies and Moths of New Zealand. In 1971 John S. Dugdale transferred species in the genus Melanchra to Graphania. The holotype specimen is held at the Natural History Museum, London.

In 2017 it was explained that Graphania tetrachroa (Meyrick, 1931) may possibly be composed of two separate species. These spearate species were the described species then named as G. tetrachora, known only from the type specimen mentioned above, and a species, currently undescribed but then known as "Graphania" cf. tetrachroa, classified at that time as Nationally Vulnerable by the 2015 New Zealand Threat Classification System. The reasoning given for this separation were the differences in wing pattern between the two entitles as well as the lack of variability in the known series of "Graphania" cf. tetrachroa. It was also argued that both entities belong in the genus Meterana. It is possible that further taxonomic work may show that these two entities belong to the same species.

In 2019 a paper published by Robert J. B. Hoare specifically addressed the genus placement of Graphania tetrachroa, known only from the type specimen. Hoare, having dissected the holotype specimen and studying the female genitalia, placed that species within the genus Meterana. The challenge of resolving the possible undescribed species, now known as "Meterana" cf. tetrachroa, was left for a future date.

== Description ==
Meyrick originally described the adult female of the species as follows:

♀ 37 mm. Head dark grey, mixed light greenish. Palpi, pale greyish-ochreous, with three blackish bars, projecting scales of second joint grey. Thorax, dark grey mixed black, crests and tegulae except margins moss-green. Forewings rather elongate-triangular, termen rather obliquely curved, crenate; ashy-grey, ground colour largely obscured by moss-green and black markings; a green subcostal streak from base to 5/6 with several black transverse marks, costal edge above this posteriorly blackish with three whitish dots; basal third green except on veins, with two oblique black streaks beneath cell near base, beyond these a small spot of pale brownish edged posteriorly by a blackish mark, just above dorsum a strong black longitudinal streak edged white beneath; dorsal edge pale ochreous-brown throughout, marginal scales whitish; first line curved, green, edged black posteriorly, interrupted on veins; oblique-oval orbicular and curvedtransverse reniform green, very finely whitish-edged, united by a trapezoidal deep black blotch, and externally black-edged with adjacent spaces mixed green and black; claviform represented by a rounded black blotch mixed green resting on first line; second line green and whitish, edged black anteriorly, interrupted on veins, angulated above and bidentate below middle, followed by a green fascia interrupted on veins; subterminal line forming three nearly straight segments united by light ochreous-brown spots, two lower white strongly edged black suffusion, upper represented by thick blackish anterior margin and a pale green blotch extending to apex; a terminal series of black crescentic marks preceded by green spots; cilia pale greenish. Hindwings grey; an interrupted dark grey terminal line; cilia, grey whitish, a grey subbasal line round upper part of termen.

== Distribution ==
The species is endemic to New Zealand and has only been collected at Waimarino National Park.

== Biology and behaviour ==
The adult female of this species was on the wing in January. This species was collected using a sugar trap.

== Conservation status ==
In 2015 this species was classified as having the "Data Deficient" conservation status under the New Zealand Threat Classification System. In that document the species was treated as two separate entitles. The species now known as Meterana tetrachroa was classified as "Data Deficient" and "Meterana" cf. tetrachroa was classified as "Nationally vulnerable".

In 2025 this species was again classified as "data deficient" under the New Zealand Threat Classification System. The taxonomically indeterminate species currently known as "Meterana" cf. tetrachroa was classified as "At Risk - declining".
