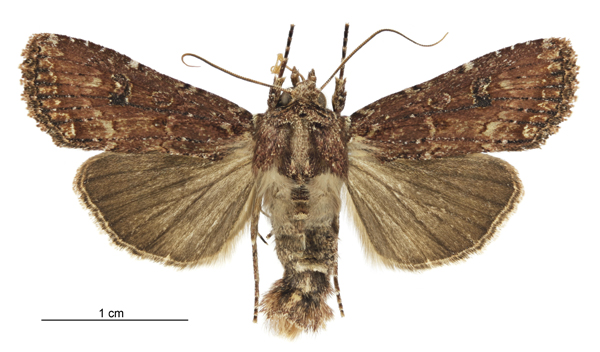
- Male
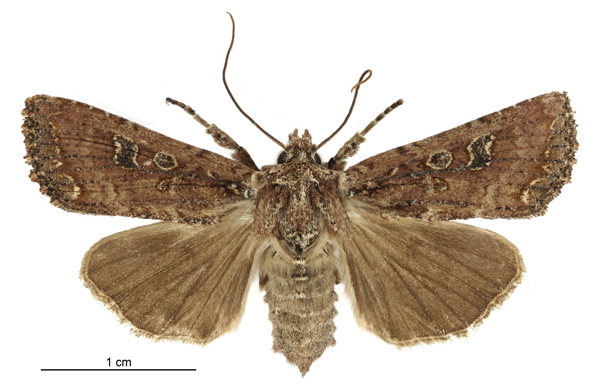
- Female

Scientific classification
- Kingdom: Animalia
- Phylum: Arthropoda
- Clade: Pancrustacea
- Class: Insecta
- Order: Lepidoptera
- Superfamily: Noctuoidea
- Family: Noctuidae
- Genus: Ichneutica
- Species: I. morosa

Binomial name
- Ichneutica morosa (Butler, 1880)

Synonyms
- Xylophasia morosa Butler, 1880; Mamestra pelistis Meyrick, 1887; Graphania morosa (Butler, 1880); Melanchra morosa (Butler, 1880)

= Ichneutica morosa =

Species of moth

Ichneutica morosa is a moth of the family Noctuidae. It is endemic to New Zealand and is found in the southern parts of the North Island and throughout the South Island. I. morosa is common in the eastern parts of both those islands and also in Fiordland. I. morosa can be found from altitudes ranging from lowlands to the alpine zone. I. morosa is absent from the range of its closely related species I. mustulenta, that is from the northern North Island. The larvae of I. morosa are known to feed on Poa astonii and also on other Poa species including introduced species. As well as its standard form the adult moths have a grey colour morph with the head and thorax being a grey and mottled brown, and the forewing being a pale greyish ochreous to a deep brown, suffused with grey. I. morosa can be confused with I. mustulenta and I. lignana. Adults are on the wing from November to April.

== Taxonomy ==
This species was described by Arthur Butler in 1880. The male holotype was collected in Marlborough by Mr Skellon and is held at the Natural History Museum, London. In 1988 J. S. Dugdale placed this species within the Graphania genus. In 2019 Robert Hoare undertook a major review of New Zealand Noctuidae. During this review the genus Ichneutica was greatly expanded and the genus Graphania was subsumed into that genus as a synonym. As a result of this review, this species is now known as Ichneutica morosa.

== Description ==
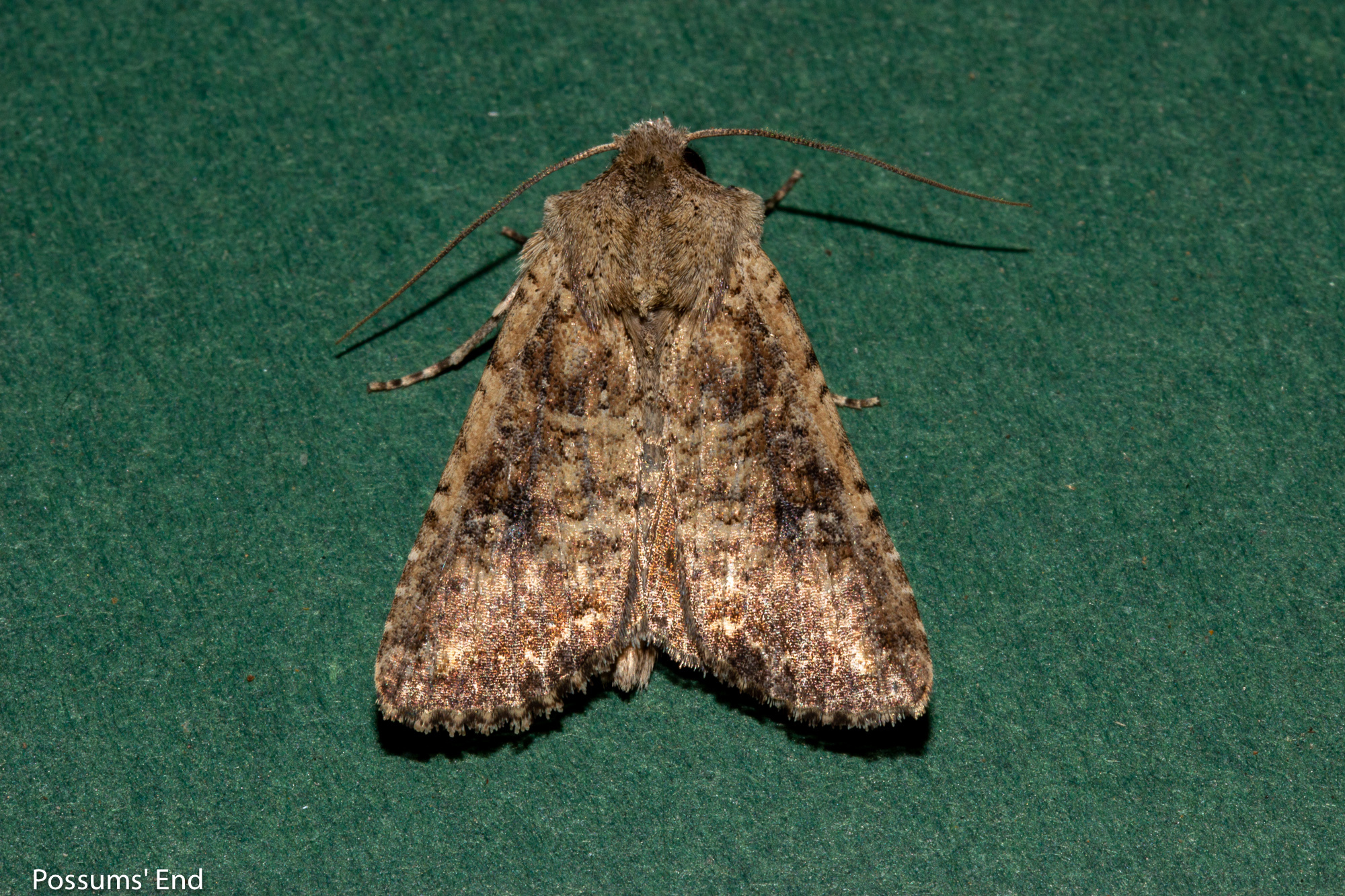
Observation of Ichneutica morosa

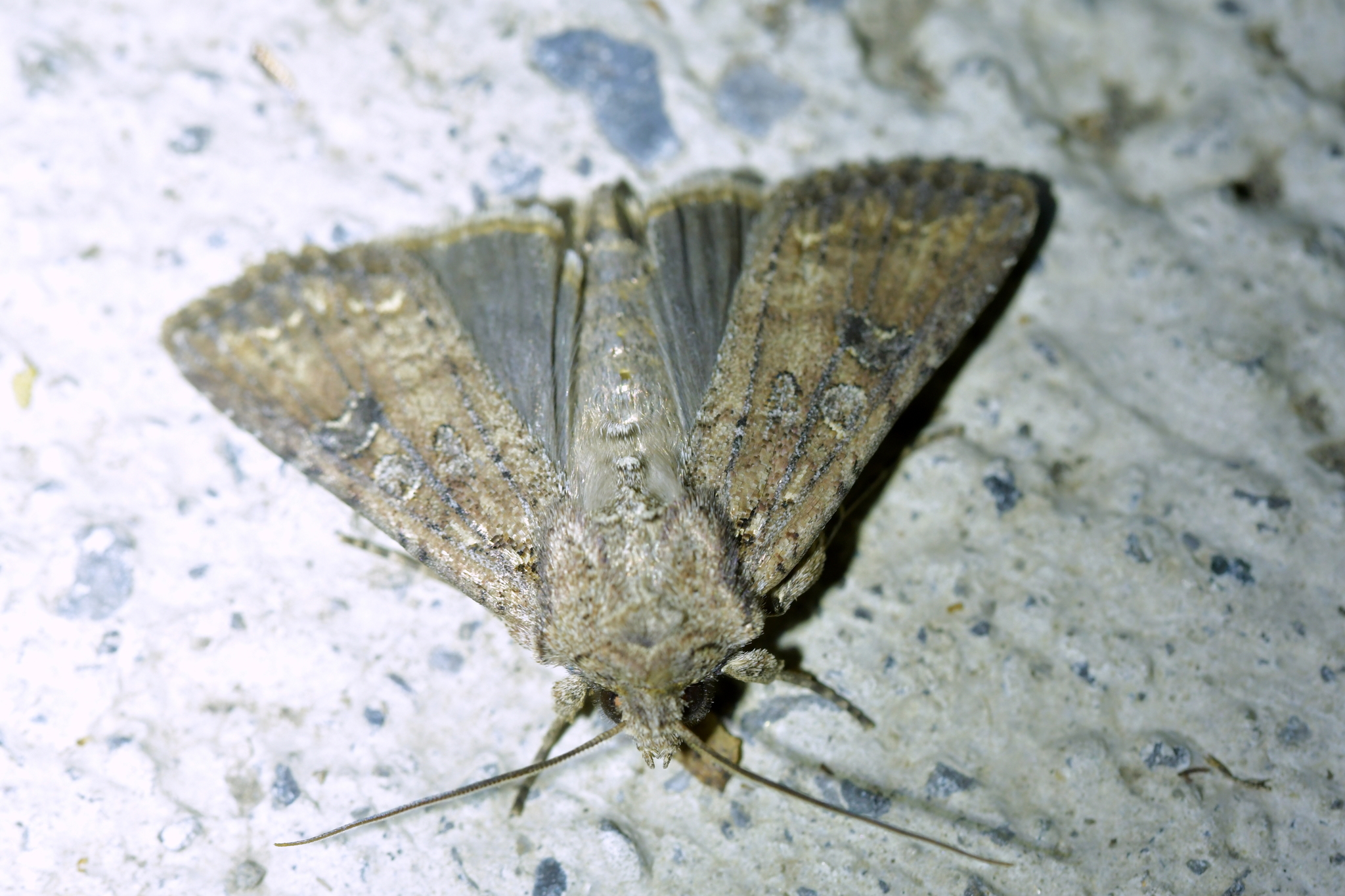
Grey form of Ichneutica morosa

Butler described the adults of the species as follows:

Allied to X. lignana, and referable to the X. rurea group, smoky-brown, primaries with the internal area and disc paler; ordinary spots greyish with black-edged white borders, the reniform extending over the base of the second median interspace and streaked with blackish, a line of which colour runs backwards from it along the median vein; a black-edged white spot close to the base of the interno-median area and three at equal distances on the costal margin; three white costal dots beyond the cell; ordinary lines obsolete; a discal series of black and white dots on the veins followed by a series of externally yellowish-edged ferruginous lunules between the veins; two dusky, somewhat triangular, patches on outer border, with black spots upon them at the extremities of the veins; fringe black spotted and traversed by a central black line; secondaries shining smoky-brown; fringe with a grey-edged yellow basal line; externally silvery-white; head and thorax brown, traversed by bisinuated darker lines; abdomen shining greyish-brown; anal segment blackish at the base, with lateral reddish-brown fringe; body below pinky-whitish, front of pectus pale purplish-brown; knees black, posterior tibiae striped at the end with black; venter with lateral black spots; primaries below shining grey, with cupreous reflections, border whitish; costal borders crossed towards the apex by grey lines; a marginal series of black dots; fringe rather paler than above; secondaries whitish, with cupreous reflections; a grey discocellular dot; a brown discal line; a marginal series of black dots. Expanse of wings 1 inch 6 lines.

The male adult of this species has a wingspan of between 32 and 40 mm and the female has a wingspan of between 34 and 38 mm. This species also has a grey colour morph with the head and thorax being a grey and mottled brown, and the forewing being a pale greyish ochreous to a deep brown, suffused with grey. I. morosa can be confused with I. mustulenta and I. lignana.

== Distribution ==
It is endemic to New Zealand. This species is found in the southern parts of the North Island and throughout the South Island.

== Habitat ==
I. morosa is common in the eastern drier parts of both the South and North Island and at a range of altitudes lowlands to the alpine zone above 900 m. It also occurs in Fiordland where the rainfall is higher. I. morosa is absent from the range of its closely related species I. mustulenta, that is from the northern North Island.

== Behaviour ==
The adults of this species is on the wing from November to April. They are attracted to light and have been collected via a mercury vapour light trap.

== Life history and host species ==
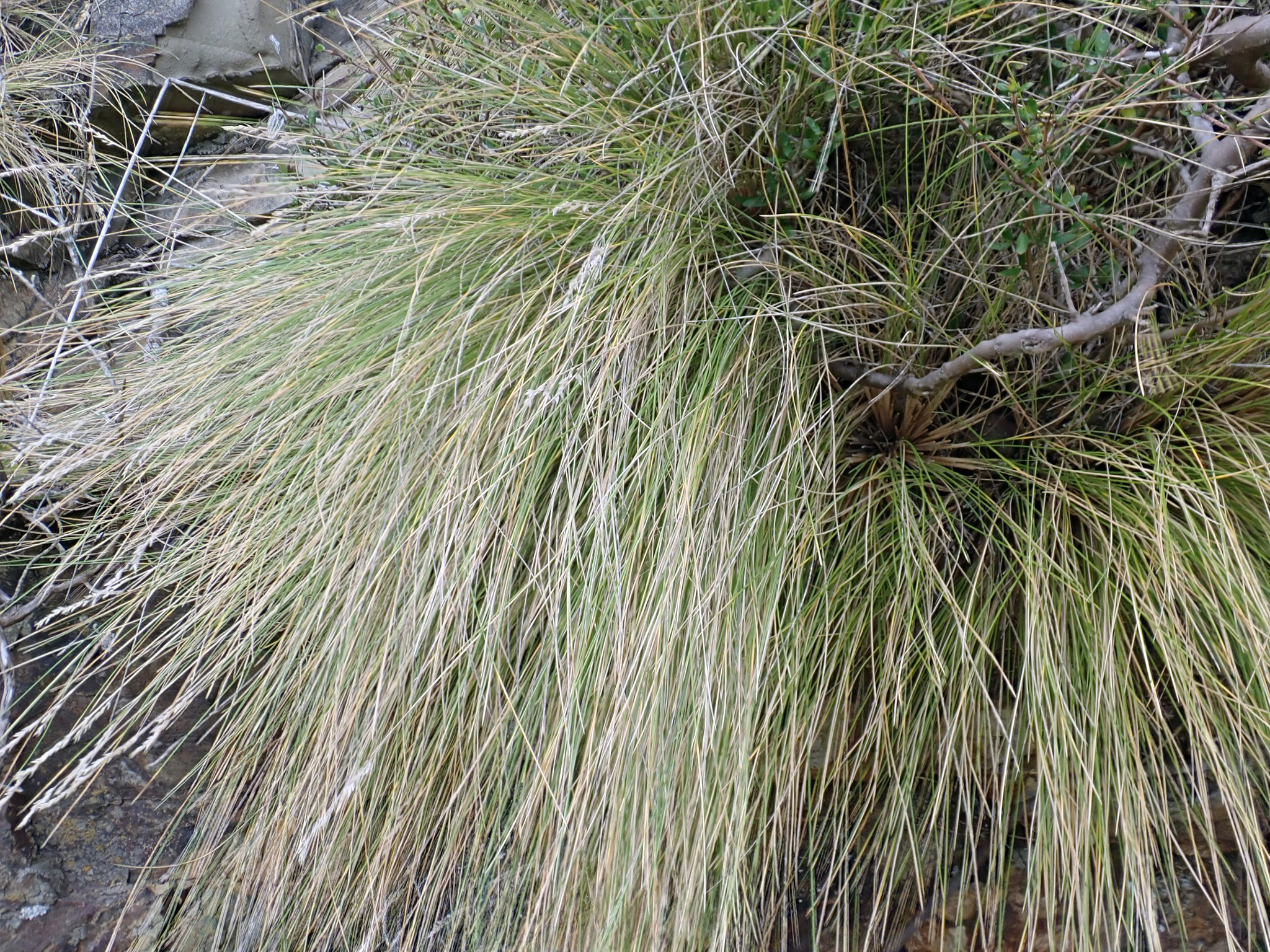
Poa astonii, larval host species of I. morosa

The life history of this species is poorly documented as are the host species of its larvae. As at 2019 the larvae are undescribed but are known to feed on Poa astonii and also on other Poa species including introduced species. The adults are known to feed on blossoms at night and Hudson witnessed adults of this species feeding on white rata flowers.
