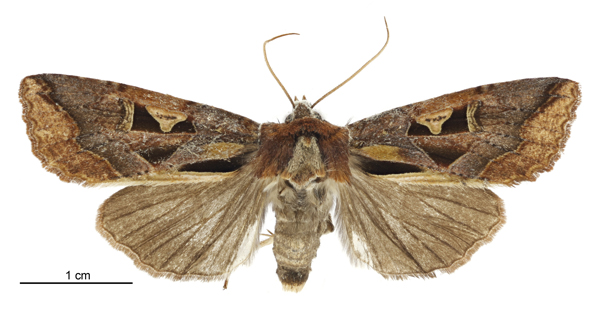
- Female
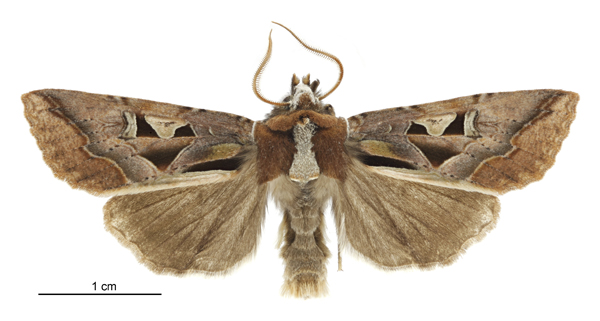
- Male

Conservation status
- Relict (NZ TCS)

Scientific classification
- Kingdom: Animalia
- Phylum: Arthropoda
- Clade: Pancrustacea
- Class: Insecta
- Order: Lepidoptera
- Superfamily: Noctuoidea
- Family: Noctuidae
- Genus: Meterana
- Species: M. grandiosa

Binomial name
- Meterana grandiosa (Philpott, 1903)

Synonyms
- Melanchra grandiosa Philpott, 1903

= Meterana grandiosa =

Species of moth

Meterana grandiosa is a species of moth in the family Noctuidae. This species is endemic to New Zealand. It is classified as "At Risk, Relict'" by the Department of Conservation.

== Taxonomy ==
This species was first described and illustrated by Alfred Philpott in 1903 and was given the name Melanchra grandiosa. Philpott used a female specimen he collected at West Plains in Southland in May. George Hudson discussed and illustrated this species in his 1928 book The Butterflies and Moths of New Zealand. In 1988 John S. Dugdale placed this species within the genus Meterana. The holotype specimen is held at the New Zealand Arthropod Collection.

== Description ==
Larvae are green in appearance with a broad white lateral stripe. As they mature larvae turn a pinkish colour and can grow to be 3.3 cm in length.

Philpott originally described the adult female of the species as follows:

♀︎, 44 mm. Antennae and legs brownish-ochreous. Palpi brown, terminal joint ochreous. Face greyish. Thorax bright orange-brown, between patagia brownish-yellow; slight anterior and strong double posterior crest. Abdomen dull-brownish, anal segment tipped with pale-yellow. Fore wings slightly sinuate on costa, apex subacute, termen crenulate, purplish-brown, base suffused with ochreous. An indistinct pale irregular line near base; a small elongate yellow spot above middle at about 1/5; an ochreous patch below middle from base to 1/5; below this a broad elbowed black line to 1/4; dorsum broadly suffused with pale-ochreous; an irregular V-sbaped pale purplish-brown line from near costa at about 1/4;, shortly bent towards base, thence obliquely to near dorsum at 1/2, again slanting upwards to reniform; space within V-shaped line much darker. Near centre of wing, above middle, a large bell-shaped ochreous blotch, the base towards costa. Eeniform faintly outlined in pale purplish-grey. A sharply defined oblique line from costa near apex to dorsum at 2/3, dentate near apex and broadly projecting below middle; beyond this line the colour is ochreous-brownish densely irrorated with dark- brown. A waved subterminal line. Cilia brownish-ochreous on termen, pale-ochreous on dorsum. Hind wings dull brownish; cilia brown, greyish towards tornus.

== Distribution ==
This species is endemic to New Zealand. M. grandiosa has occurred in Wairarapa, Central Otago, Otago Lakes, Dunedin and Southland zones. However this species is now locally extinct in its type locality of West Plains and has not been collected in Dunedin since the 1960s.

== Life cycle and behaviour ==
Larvae hide underneath the bark of their host plants during the day which makes them difficult to detect. Larvae pupate between November and December and the adult moth emerges during the autumn months of mid April to early June.

== Host species and habitat ==
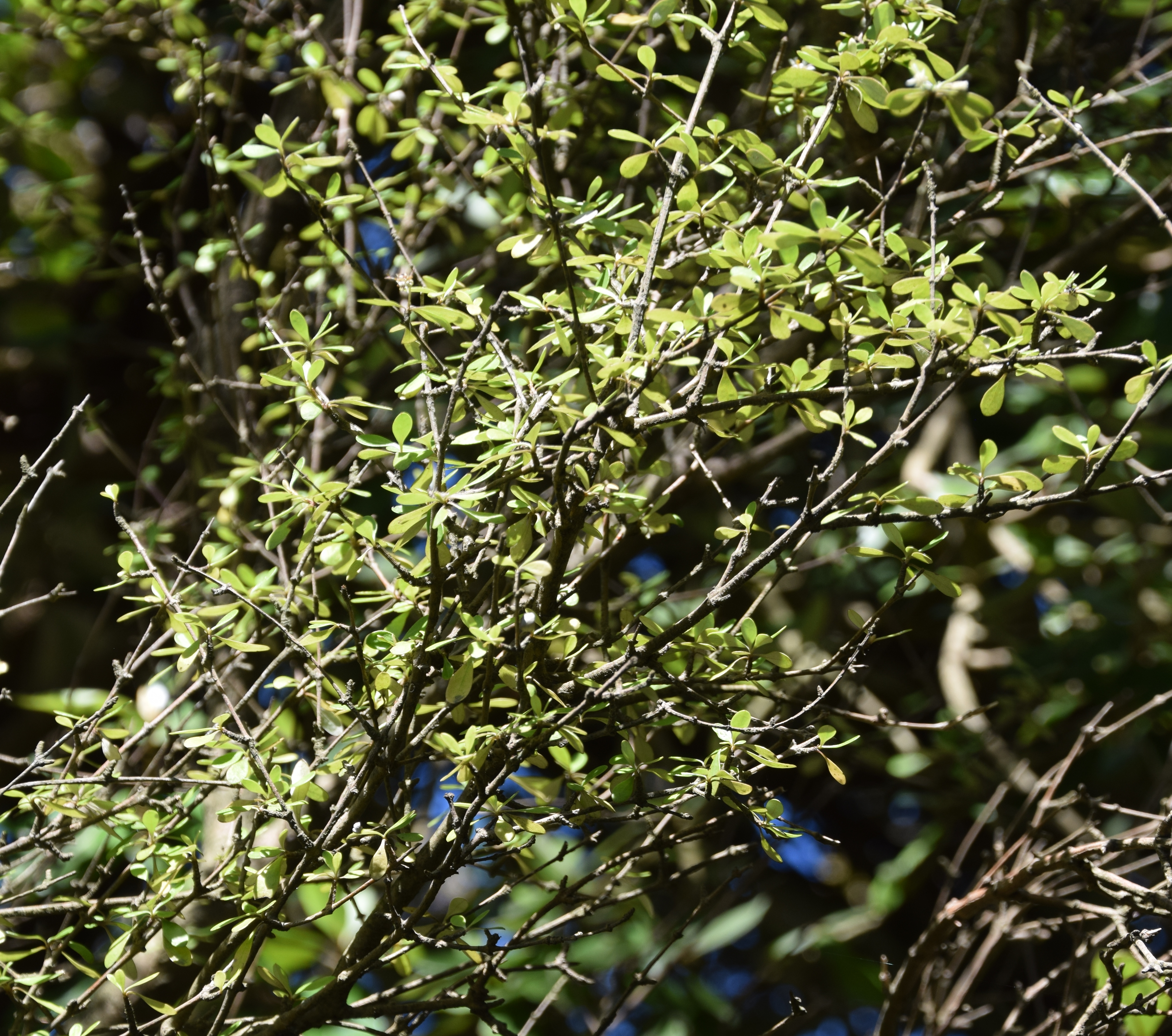
Host Olearia odorata

The plant host species for the larvae of M. grandiosa are small-leaved Olearia species. These include O. hectorii and O. odorata.

== Conservation status ==
This moth is classified under the New Zealand Threat Classification system as being "At Risk, Relict". One of the reasons for this classification is that the habitat of this species is under threat from land development. The elimination of the host plants of this species has resulted in their extinction from sites in New Zealand.
