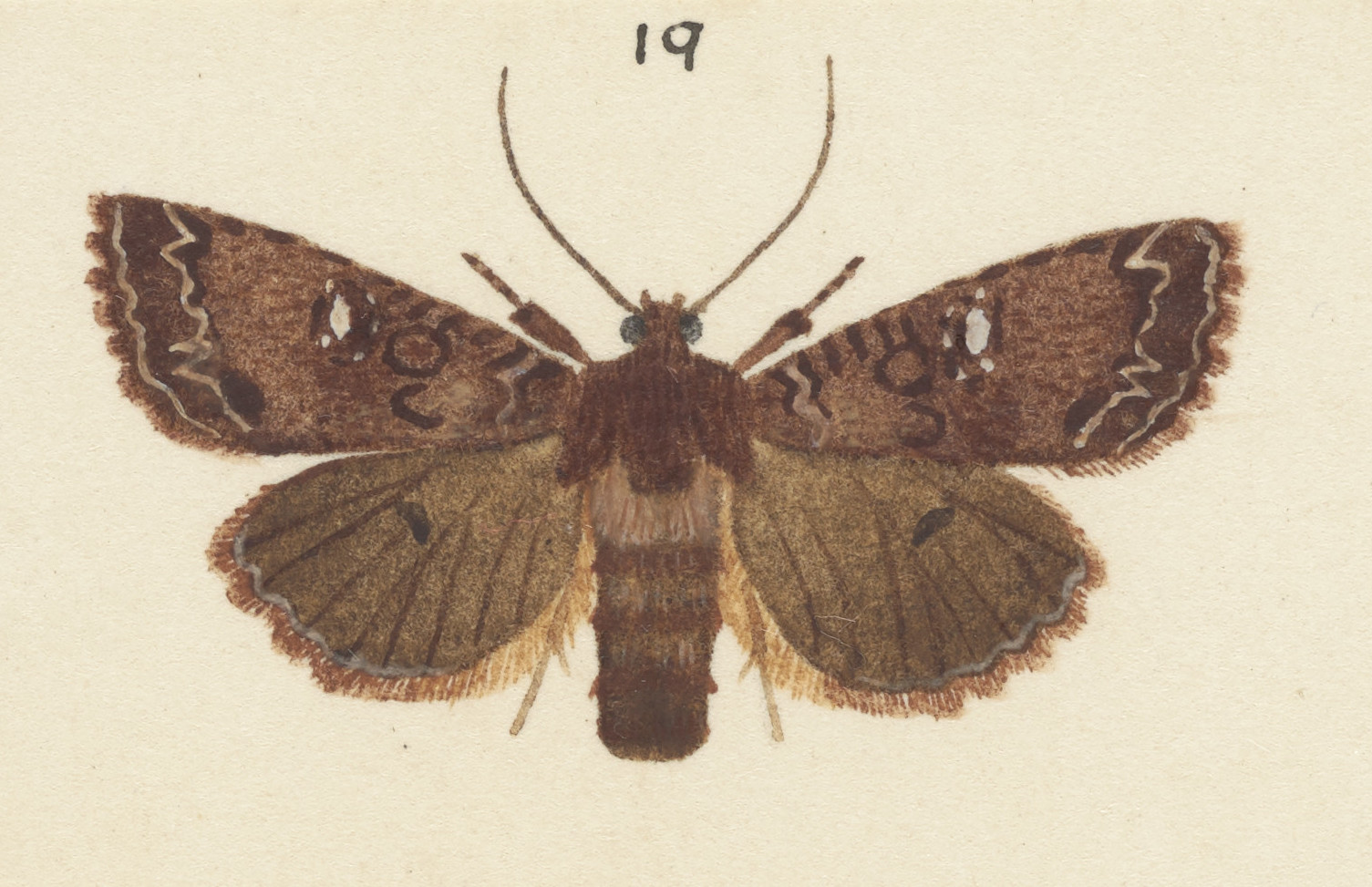
- Illustration of male

Scientific classification
- Domain: Eukaryota
- Kingdom: Animalia
- Phylum: Arthropoda
- Class: Insecta
- Order: Lepidoptera
- Superfamily: Noctuoidea
- Family: Noctuidae
- Genus: Meterana
- Species: M. coctilis

Binomial name
- Meterana coctilis (Meyrick, 1931)

Synonyms
- Melanchra coctilis Meyric, 1931

= Meterana coctilis =

Species of moth endemic to New Zealand

Meterana coctilis is a species of moth in the family Noctuidae. This species is endemic to New Zealand.
