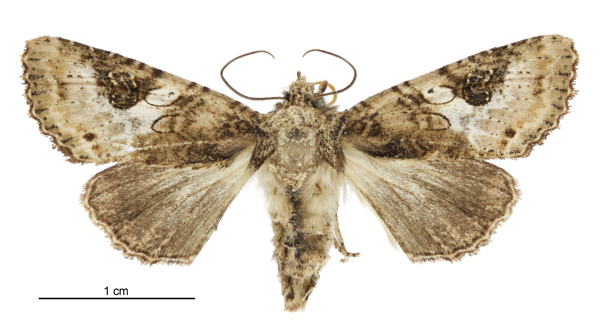
- Female
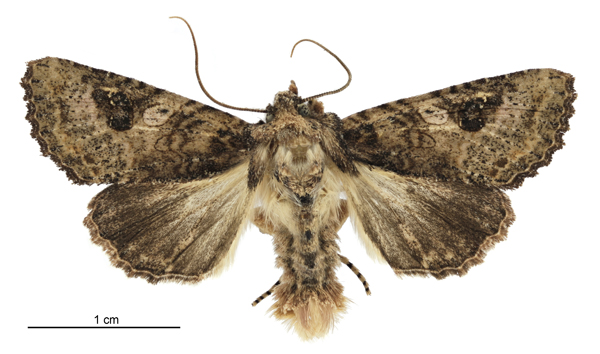
- Male

Scientific classification
- Kingdom: Animalia
- Phylum: Arthropoda
- Clade: Pancrustacea
- Class: Insecta
- Order: Lepidoptera
- Superfamily: Noctuoidea
- Family: Noctuidae
- Genus: Meterana
- Species: M. octans

Binomial name
- Meterana octans (Hudson, 1898)

Synonyms
- Melanchra octans Hudson, 1898

= Meterana octans =

Species of moth

Meterana octans is a species of moth in the family Noctuidae. It was described by George Hudson in 1898 from specimens discovered by Alfred Philpott at Mount Linton, near Invercargill. It is endemic to New Zealand.
