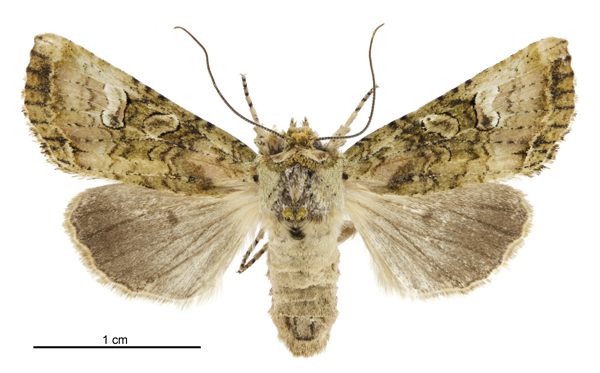
- Female
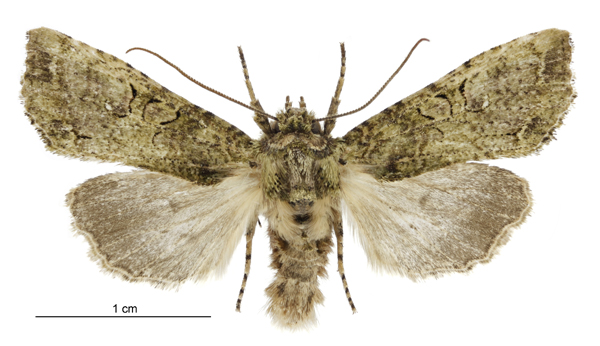
- Male

Scientific classification
- Kingdom: Animalia
- Phylum: Arthropoda
- Clade: Pancrustacea
- Class: Insecta
- Order: Lepidoptera
- Superfamily: Noctuoidea
- Family: Noctuidae
- Genus: Meterana
- Species: M. levis

Binomial name
- Meterana levis (Philpott, 1905)

Synonyms
- Melanchra levis Philpott, 1905

= Meterana levis =

Species of moth endemic to New Zealand

Meterana levis is a species of moth in the family Noctuidae. This species is endemic to New Zealand.

== Description ==
M. levis was described as Melanchra levis in 1905 by New Zealand entomologist Alfred Philpott. He described the males and female of the species as both being 35mm, and having a greenish-brown head, thorax, abdomen, and upper wings. The hind wings he described as gray with dark cilia. The fore wings also have faint blackish markings.

== Hosts ==
The larvae consume members of the Plagianthus genus, especially Plagianthus divaricatus.

== Life history ==
M. levis emerges from its cocoon in the early spring.

== Behaviour ==
Adults are attracted to light and have been collected via a mercury vapour light trap.
