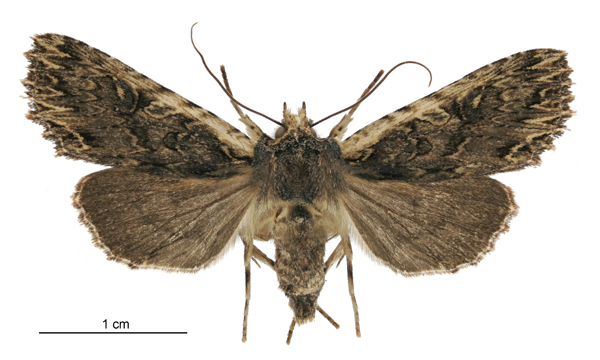
- Female
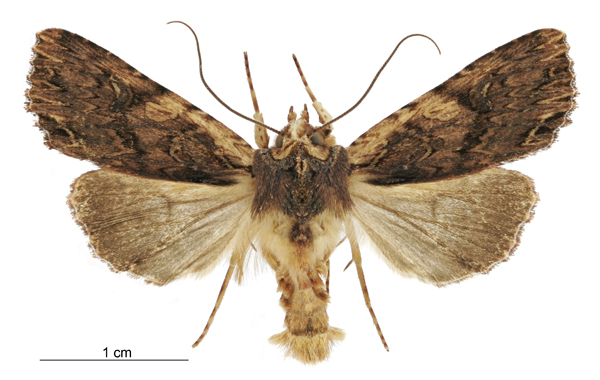
- Male

Scientific classification
- Kingdom: Animalia
- Phylum: Arthropoda
- Class: Insecta
- Order: Lepidoptera
- Superfamily: Noctuoidea
- Family: Noctuidae
- Genus: Meterana
- Species: M. alcyone

Binomial name
- Meterana alcyone (Hudson, 1898)

Synonyms
- Melanchra alcyone Hudson, 1898

= Meterana alcyone =

Species of moth endemic to New Zealand

Meterana alcyone is a species of moth in the family Noctuidae, the owlet moths. This species is endemic to New Zealand and is found in the North and South Islands. The larvae of this species feed on the leaves of Muehlenbeckia complexa and Corynocarpus laevigatus. Adults are on the wing every month of the year except January. They are attracted to light and have also been recorded as bycatch in the New Zealand National Fruit Fly Surveillance fly traps.

== Taxonomy ==
This species was first described by George Hudson in 1898 using specimens collected by A. Norris at the Wellington Botanic Garden and named Melanchra alcyone. In 1928 Hudson discussed and illustrated this species under that name. In 1971 J. S. Dugdale discussed this species suggesting that it might belong within the Erana group. In 1988 J. S. Dugdale placed this species in the genus Meterana. As at 1988 the syntype series of this species has not been located.

== Description ==
Hudson described this species as follows:

The expansion of the wings of the ♂ is 1 5/8 inches, of the ♀ 1 1/2 inches. The fore-wings of the male are warm brown, darker towards the base; there is a wavy, white-edged, black, transverse line at about one-fifth, followed by a round black spot; the casta is yellowish, with four pairs of short oblique black marks; the orbicular is large, oval, oblique, pale yellowish-brown slightly darker in the middle; the claviform is small, obscure, and brownish-black; the reniform is black, outlined with dull white; there is a series of very acute, dull white, tooth-like terminal markings, and the termen itself is slightly scalloped; the cilia are dark brown. The hind-wings are grey with a series of small dark marks on the termen; the cilia are reddish-ochreous. The head and anterior portion of the thorax are reddish-ochreous; the rest of the thorax is rich brown, and there is a conspicuous black transverse line between the pale and dark colouring; the abdomen is reddish-ochreous with the crests reddish-brown. The female is much darker and duller than the male, the markings are much less distinct, there are several additional jagged transverse lines, and the white markings of the male are indistinctly indicated in drab.

== Distribution ==
This species is endemic to New Zealand and can be found in the North and South Islands.

== Habitat ==
The preferred habitat of this species is native forest, shrubland, and coastal dunes.

== Host species ==
The larvae of this species feed on the leaves of Muehlenbeckia complexa and Corynocarpus laevigatus. Caterpillars feed on leaves at night, and rest during the daytime, where their strong resemblance to a broken twig camouflages them.

== Behaviour ==
The adults of this species are on the wing every month of the year except January, but are especially common in winter and early spring. They are attracted to light. Adults have also been caught as bycatch in the New Zealand National Fruit Fly Surveillance fly traps.

== Gallery ==
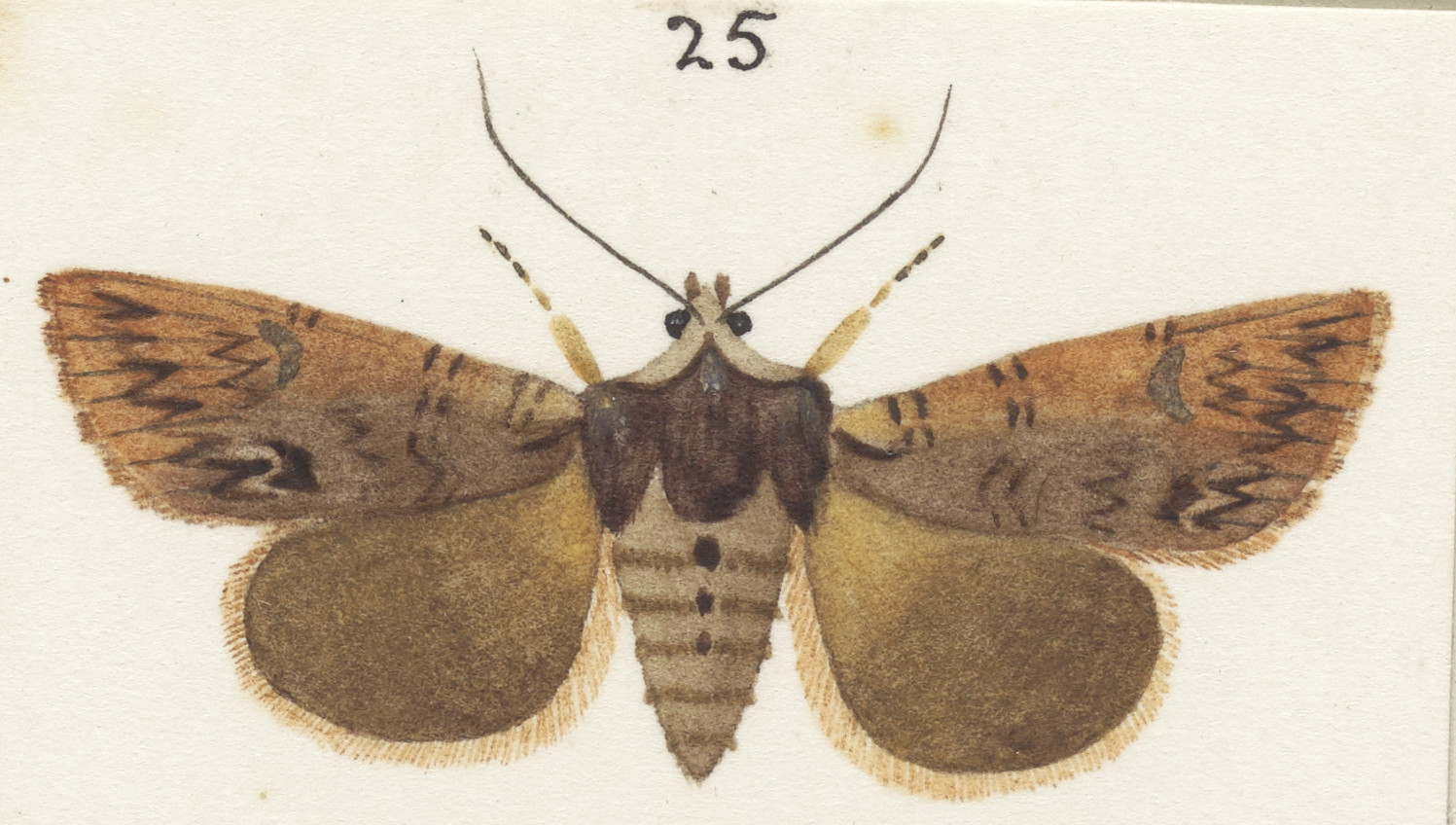
Illustration of female M. alcyone by George Hudson.

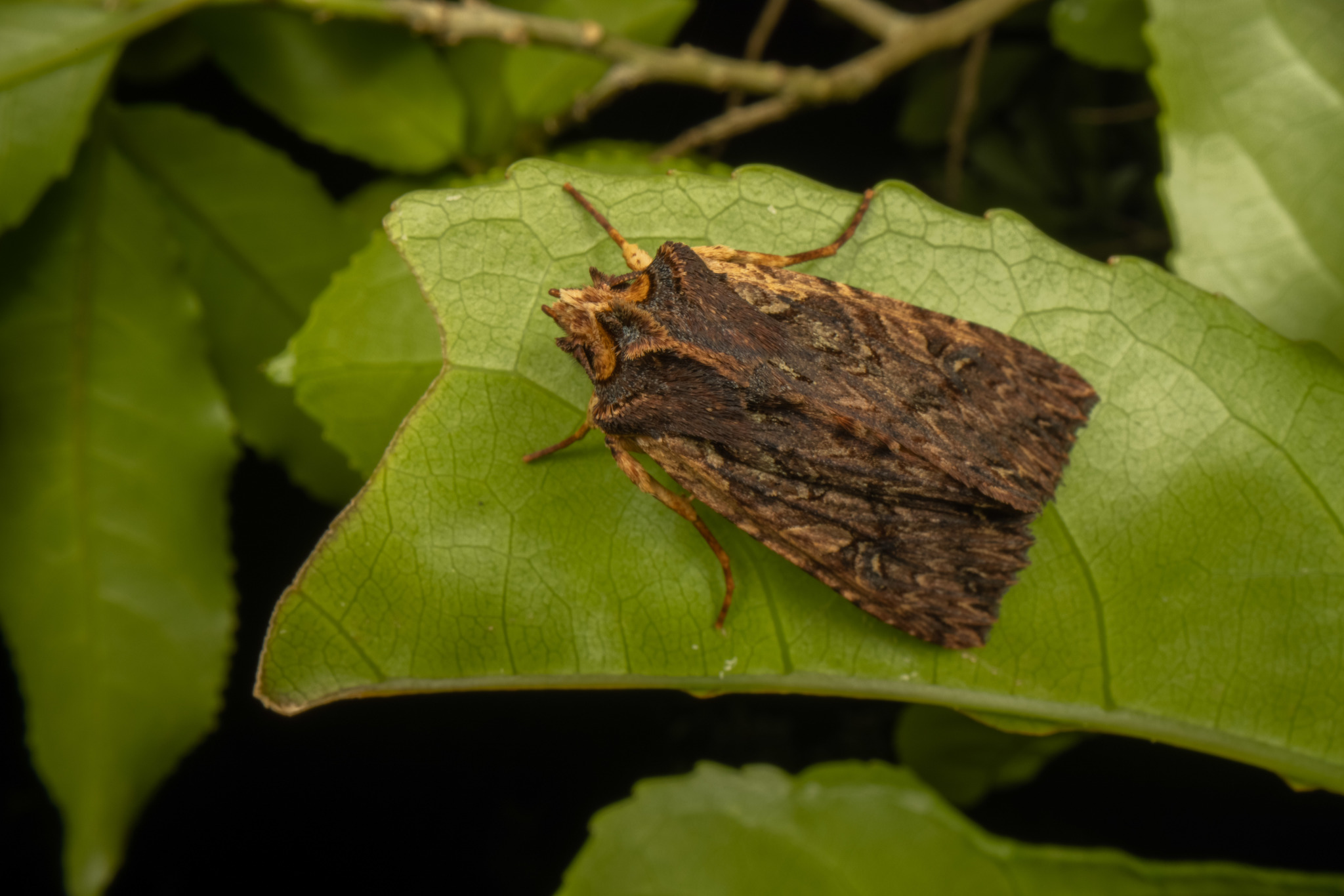
Live M. alcyone.

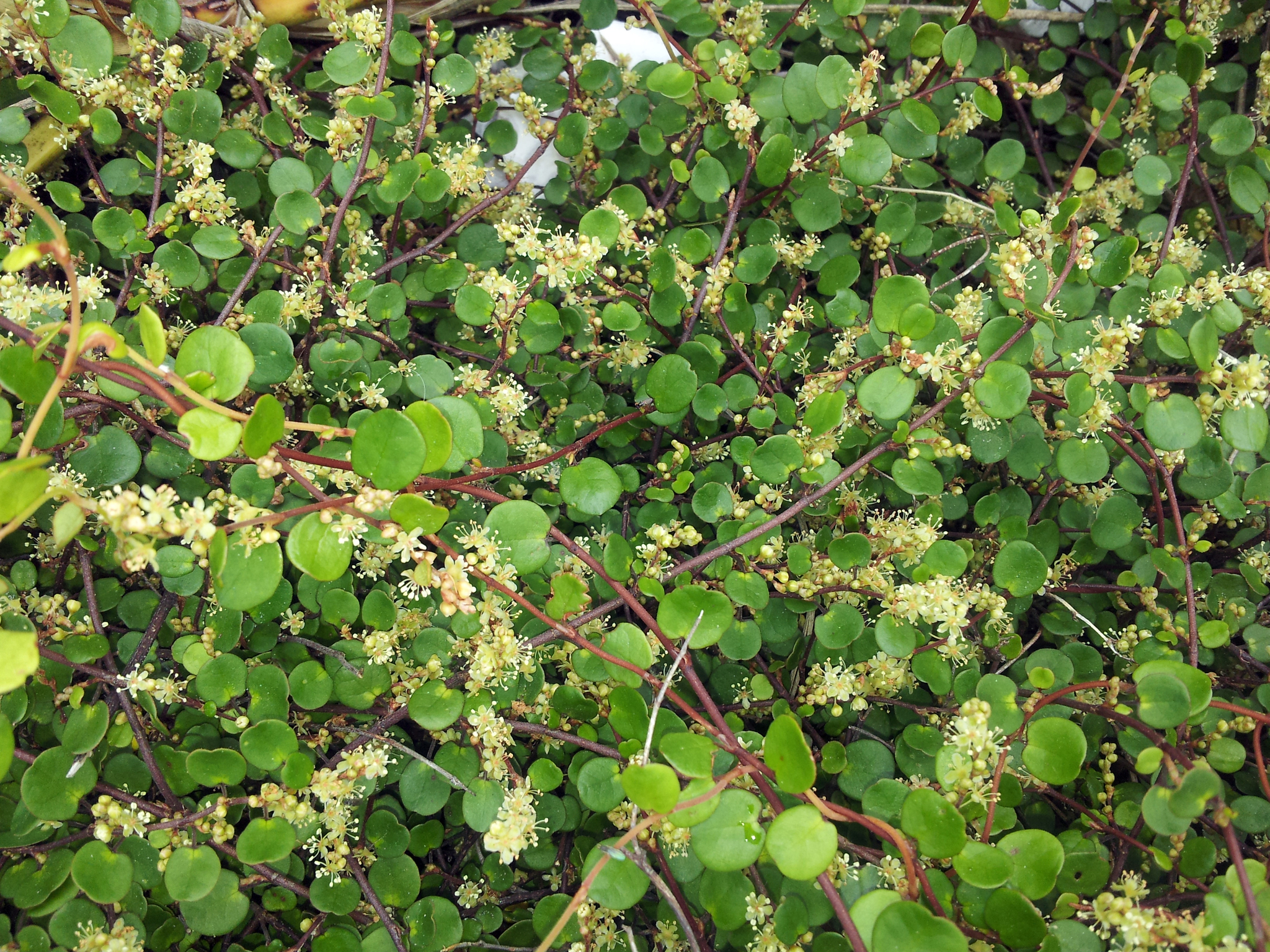
Muehlenbeckia complexa, larval host of M. alcyone.
