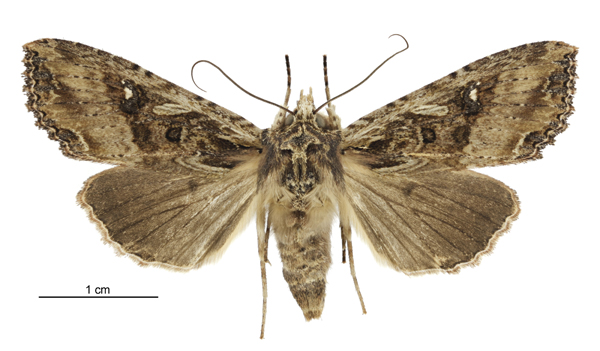
- Female
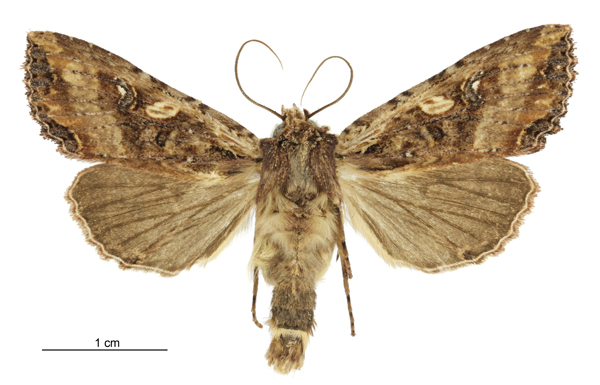
- Male

Scientific classification
- Kingdom: Animalia
- Phylum: Arthropoda
- Clade: Pancrustacea
- Class: Insecta
- Order: Lepidoptera
- Superfamily: Noctuoidea
- Family: Noctuidae
- Genus: Meterana
- Species: M. stipata

Binomial name
- Meterana stipata (Walker, 1865)

Synonyms
- Xylina stipata Walker, 1865; Melanchra stipata (Walker, 1865)

= Meterana stipata =

Species of moth

Meterana stipata is a moth of the family Noctuidae. It was described by Francis Walker in 1865 from specimens collected in Auckland. It is endemic to New Zealand.

Adults are attracted to light and have been collected via a mercury vapour light trap.
