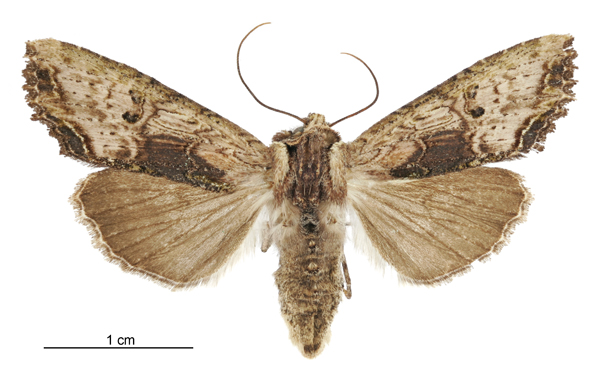
- Female
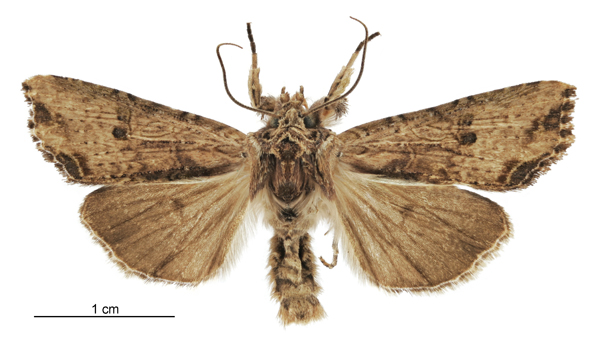
- Male

Scientific classification
- Kingdom: Animalia
- Phylum: Arthropoda
- Class: Insecta
- Order: Lepidoptera
- Superfamily: Noctuoidea
- Family: Noctuidae
- Genus: Meterana
- Species: M. coeleno

Binomial name
- Meterana coeleno (Hudson, 1898)

Synonyms
- Melanchra coeleno Hudson, 1898

= Meterana coeleno =

Species of moth endemic to New Zealand

Meterana coeleno is a species of moth in the family Noctuidae. This species is endemic to New Zealand.
