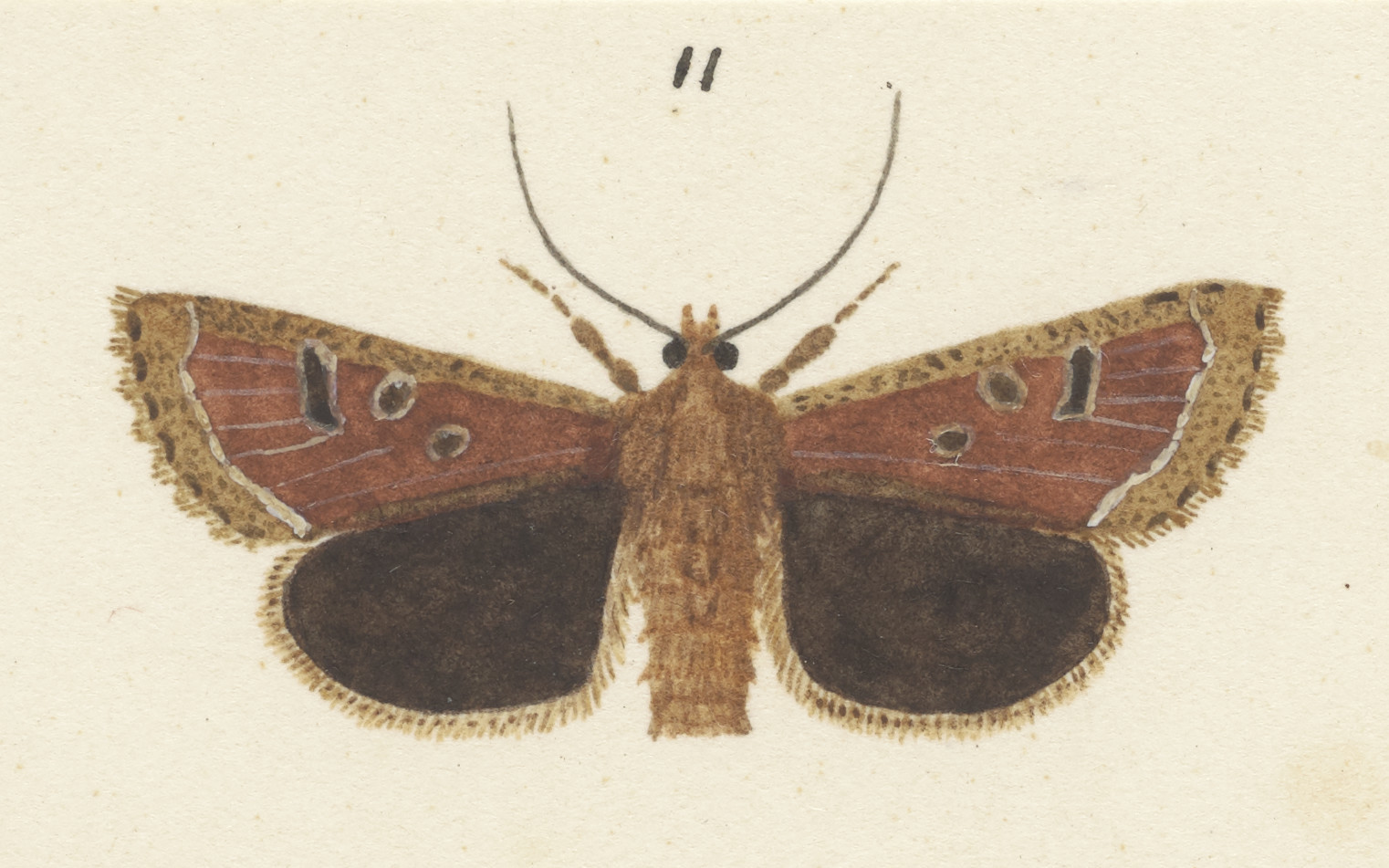
- Illustration of male

Scientific classification
- Domain: Eukaryota
- Kingdom: Animalia
- Phylum: Arthropoda
- Class: Insecta
- Order: Lepidoptera
- Superfamily: Noctuoidea
- Family: Noctuidae
- Genus: Meterana
- Species: M. badia

Binomial name
- Meterana badia (Philpott, 1927)

Synonyms
- Melanchra badia Philpott, 1927; Melanchra meridiana Salmon, 1956

= Meterana badia =

Species of moth endemic to New Zealand

Meterana badia is a species of moth in the family Noctuidae. This species is endemic to New Zealand.

== Taxonomy ==
This species was first described by Alfred Philpott in 1927 using a male specimen collected by himself at Leslie Valley, Mount Arthur in November and named Melanchra badia. In 1988 J. S. Dugdale placed this species in the genus Meterana. In the same publication Dugdale synonymises Melanchra meridiana with this species. The male holotype specimen is held in the New Zealand Arthropod Collection.

== Description ==
Philpott described this species as follows:

♂. 38 mm. Head greyish-brown. Palpi greyish-brown, terminal segment and apex of second segment mixed with ochreous. Antennae minutely ciliated; ferruginous, basal third ochreous-grey. Thorax with slight anterior crest, greyish-brown. Abdomen grey mixed with fuscous, anterior segments prominently crested, each crest with apical blackish bar. Legs ochreous, middle and anterior pair mixed with brown, anterior tarsi more or less infuscated. Forewings moderate, costa almost straight, apex rectangular, termen rounded, rather oblique, crenulate; chestnut-brown; costa narrowly, and termen more widely, greenish-olive; an indistinct, paired angled fuscous fascia near base; a pair of blackish dots on costa at ⅓ and three others before and above reniform; costa between these dots greyish-ochreous; orbicular ovate, dark fuscous ringed with ochreous-white; reniform narrow, inner basal angle somewhat produced, blackish, margined with ochreous-white; claviform obscure, fuscous, margined anteriorly with ochreous-white; second line indicated by dull serrate paired fasciae, excurved to middle, thence incurved to dorsum; subterminal line prominent, margining olive terminal band, ochreouswhite; an indistinct waved blackish terminal line; fringes brown with pale basal and dark median crenulate lines. Hindwings dark fuscous; fringes ochreous-whitish with broad fuscous basal line.

== Distribution ==
This species is endemic to New Zealand.
