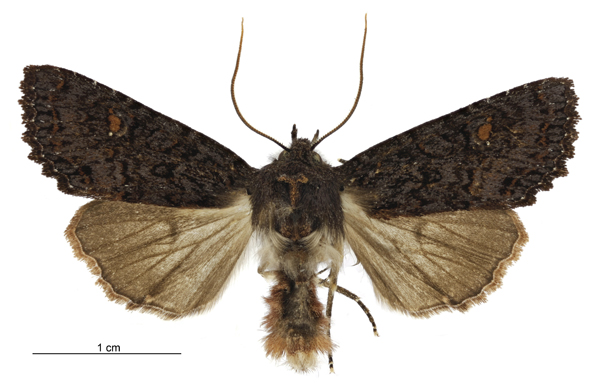
- Male
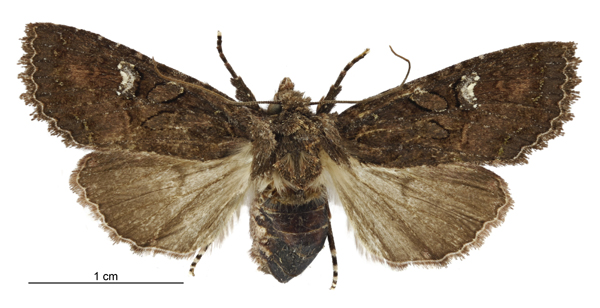
- Female

Scientific classification
- Kingdom: Animalia
- Phylum: Arthropoda
- Clade: Pancrustacea
- Class: Insecta
- Order: Lepidoptera
- Superfamily: Noctuoidea
- Family: Noctuidae
- Genus: Meterana
- Species: M. vitiosa

Binomial name
- Meterana vitiosa (Butler, 1877)

Synonyms
- Apamea vitiosa Butler, 1877; Mamestra proteastis Meyrick, 1888; Melanchra vitiosa (Butler, 1877)

= Meterana vitiosa =

Species of moth

Meterana vitiosa is a moth of the family Noctuidae. It was described by Arthur Gardiner Butler in 1877 from specimens collected by Dr Hector and Mr J. D. Enys in the South Island. It is endemic to New Zealand. The habitat this species prefers consists of forests and shrub-land areas. Adults are on the wing throughout the year.

Adults are attracted to light and have been collected via a mercury vapour light trap.
