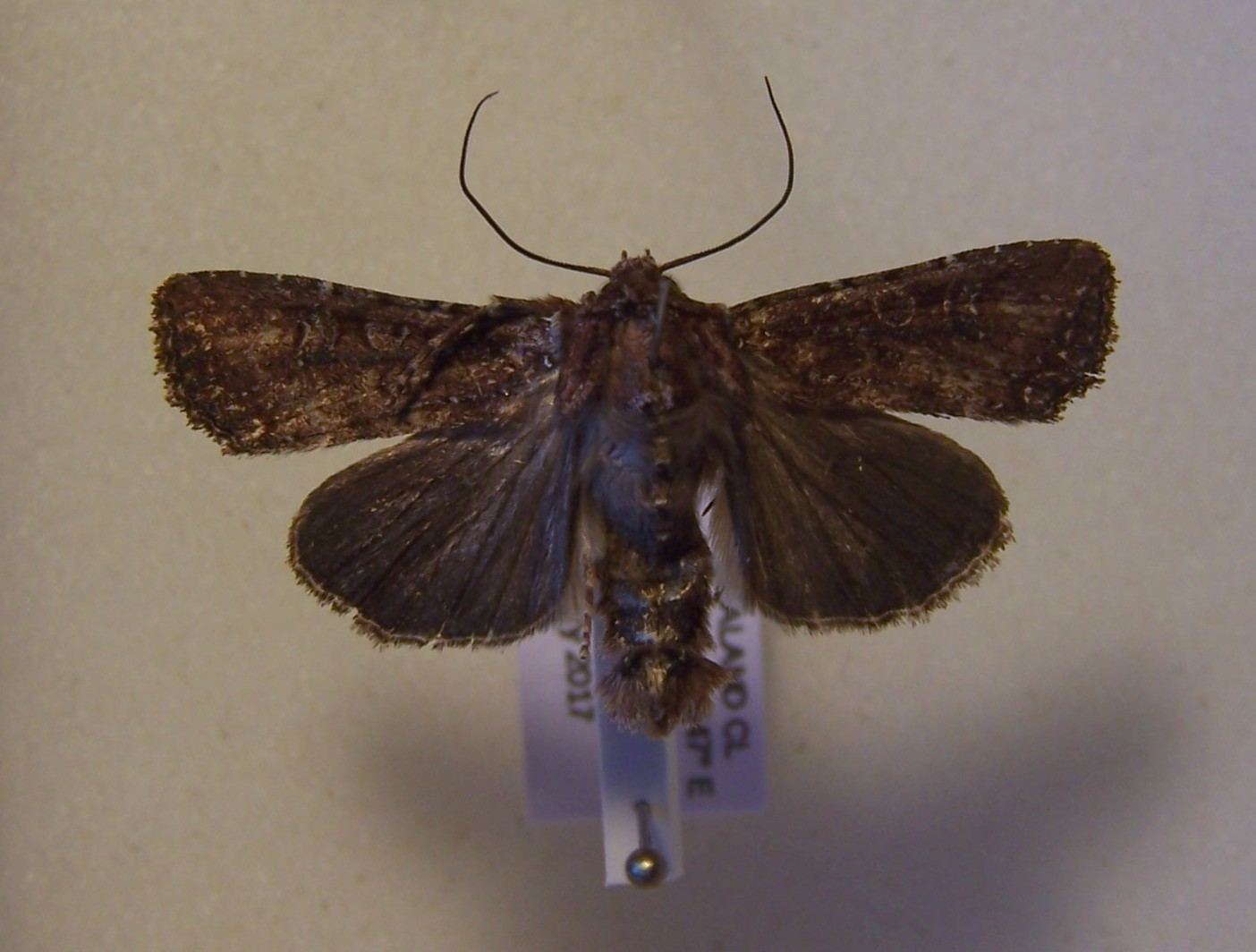

Scientific classification
- Kingdom: Animalia
- Phylum: Arthropoda
- Clade: Pancrustacea
- Class: Insecta
- Order: Lepidoptera
- Superfamily: Noctuoidea
- Family: Noctuidae
- Genus: Ichneutica
- Species: I. mustulenta

Binomial name
- Ichneutica mustulenta Hoare, 2019

= Ichneutica mustulenta =

Species of moth

Ichneutica mustulenta is a moth of the family Noctuidae. This species is endemic to New Zealand is widespread throughout the North, South and Stewart Islands. I. mustulenta prefers damp native forest in the west of the North and South Islands. Its range only overlaps with its close relative I. morosa in a few places such as Taranaki. The life history of this species is unknown as are the host species of its larvae. However it is assumed that the larval hosts of this species will be grasses similar to its close relatives in the same genus. Adults of this species are on the wing from January to March.

== Taxonomy ==
This species was first described by Robert Hoare in 2019. The male holotype specimen, collected at Titirangi by C. R. Thomas, is held at the New Zealand Arthropod Collection.

== Description ==
The adult male of this species has a wingspan of between 33 and 36 mm and the female has a wingspan of 38 mm. The adults of I. mustulenta are a deep red wine colour and it is this feature that distinguishes it from its close relative I. morosa. The underside of the hindwings of I. mustulenta are also a much deeper colour than those of I. morosa and this can also be used to distinguish the two species.

== Distribution ==
This species is endemic to New Zealand. This species is widespread throughout the North, South and Stewart Islands.

== Habitat ==
I. mustulenta prefers damp native forest in the west of the North and South Islands. Its range only overlaps with its close relative I. morosa in a few places such as Taranaki.

== Behaviour ==
Adults of this species are on the wing from January to March.

== Life history and host species ==
The life history of this species is unknown as are the host species of its larvae. However it is assumed that the larval hosts of this species will be grasses similar to its close relatives in the same genus.
