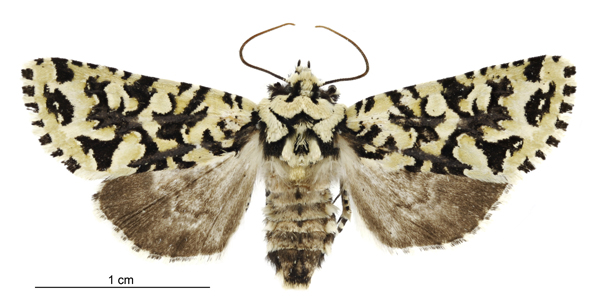
- Female
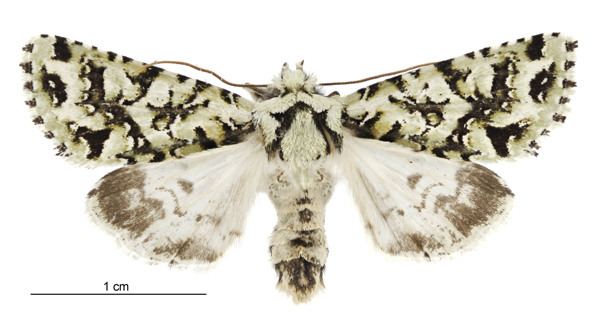
- Male

Conservation status
- Relict (NZ TCS)

Scientific classification
- Kingdom: Animalia
- Phylum: Arthropoda
- Clade: Pancrustacea
- Class: Insecta
- Order: Lepidoptera
- Superfamily: Noctuoidea
- Family: Noctuidae
- Genus: Meterana
- Species: M. exquisita

Binomial name
- Meterana exquisita (Philpott, 1903)

Synonyms
- Melanchra exquisita Philpott, 1903

= Meterana exquisita =

Species of moth endemic to New Zealand

Meterana exquisita (also known as the exquisite owlet moth) is a species of moth in the family Noctuidae. This species is endemic to New Zealand. It is classified as "At Risk, Relict'" by the Department of Conservation.

== Taxonomy ==
This species was first described and illustrated by Alfred Philpott in 1903 and was given the name Melanchra exquisita. Philpott used a male specimen he collected at West Plains in Southland in December. George Hudson discussed and illustrated this species in his 1928 book The Butterflies and Moths of New Zealand. In 1988 John S. Dugdale placed this species within the genus Meterana. The holotype specimen is held at the New Zealand Arthropod Collection.

== Description ==
The larvae of this species are large, angular and green coloured with thin red and white lines.

Philpott originally described the male of the species as follows:

♂︎. 32 mm. Head and palpi greenish; tips of palpi and outward surfaces blackish; two linear black marks on crown of head. Antennae brownish, shortly bipectinated. Legs greenish, annulated with black. Thorax with moderate bifid anterior and posterior crest; green, with black irregular V-shaped mark, the apex towards head. Abdomen dull-yellowish, anal segments black; also blackish on sides of segments, and dorsal series of black spots. Fore wings : Costa almost straight, apex rounded; termen not crenulate, obliquely rounded, bright-green, black suffusion from base obliquely towards dorsum, terminating in oblique black white-margined upwardly bent projection at 1/4; distinct white irregularly black-margined line from costa near base to black suffusion, irregular interrupted white -margined black line from about 1/4 of costa to before 1/2 of dorsum, several irregular projections at middle of wing, and upper half of line forked; irregular black outwardly white-margined band at 1/2, outwardly oblique to middle of wing, thence inwardly oblique to dorsum, on which broadly and irregularly clavate; costa with alternate black and white dots; reniform spot obscurely outlined in black, edged with white; dentate black line beyond reniform, indentations filled with white; strong subterminal black line, interrupted above and below middle, broadly and suffusedly white-margined. Cilia green, barred with black, and with an indistinct darker line. Hind wings pale greenish-yellow, with brownish suffusion on apical portion; an irregular line at 2/3, and discal spot of same colour. Cilia pale-green.

== Distribution ==
This species is endemic to New Zealand. M. exquisita has occurred in Auckland, Waikato, Taupō, Whanganui, Wairarapa, Nelson, South Canterbury, Mackenzie country, Central Otago, Otago Lakes and Southland. However this species is now locally extinct in its type locality of West Plains and is almost wiped out in Auckland.

== Life cycle and behaviour ==
This species has only one generation a year. The larvae are bright green coloured and as a result are well camouflaged when feeding on their host species. Larvae feed for one month before they pupate. M. exquisita are on the wing from August to December but are most common from September to October. The species can fly for at least 800m from their nearest host plant. This species has been collected at sugar traps.

== Host species and habitat ==
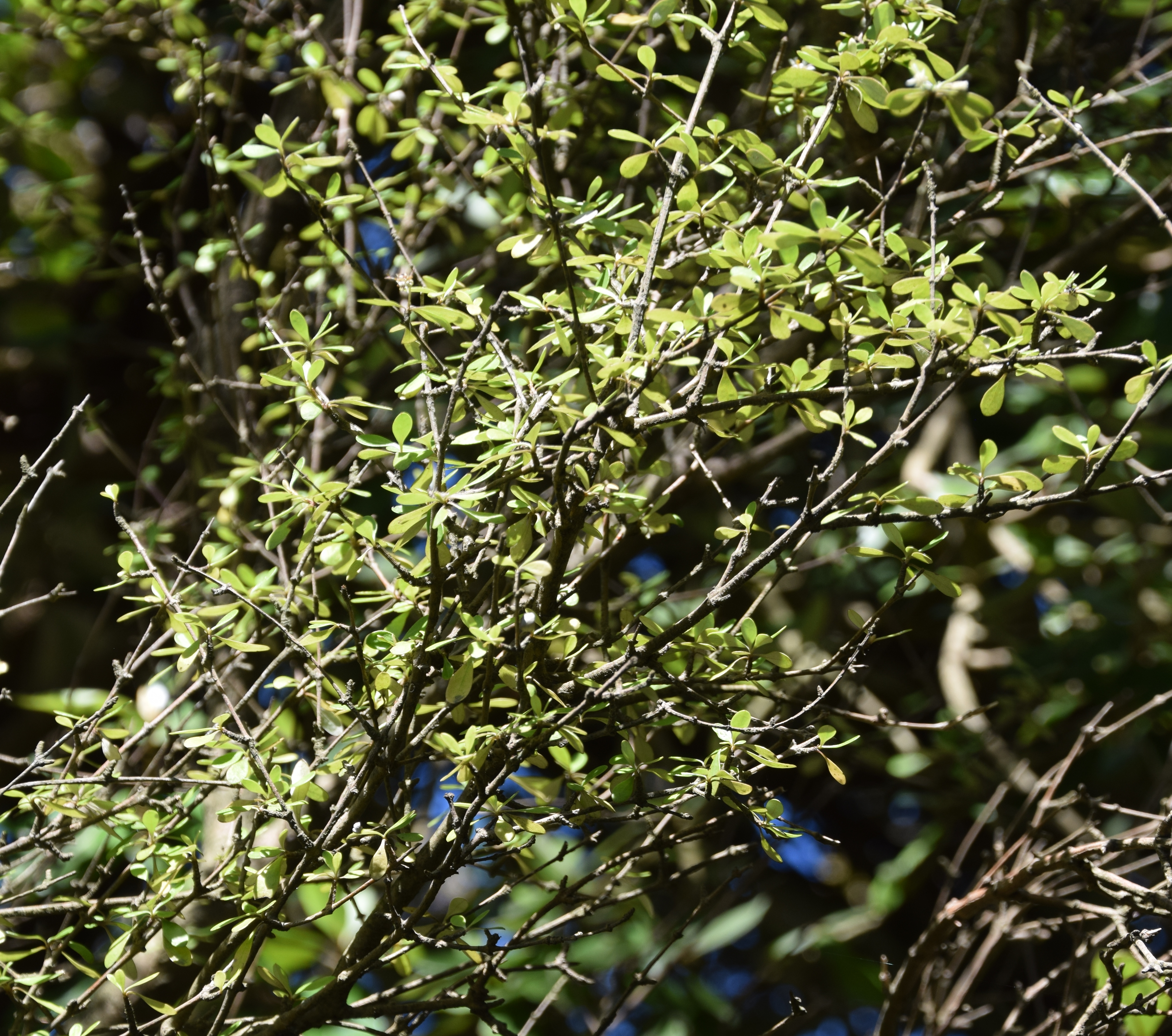
Host Olearia odorata

The plant host species for the larvae of M. exquisita are small-leaved Olearia species. These include O. hectorii, O. odorata, and O. bullata.

== Conservation status ==
This moth is classified under the New Zealand Threat Classification system as being "At Risk, Relict". One of the reasons for this classification is that the habitat of this species is under threat from land development. The elimination of the host plants of this species has resulted in their extinction from sites in New Zealand.
