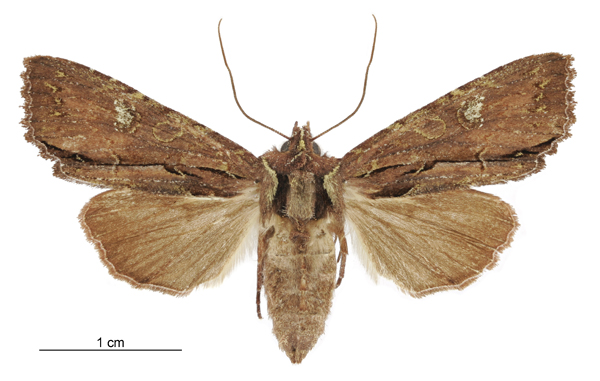
- Female
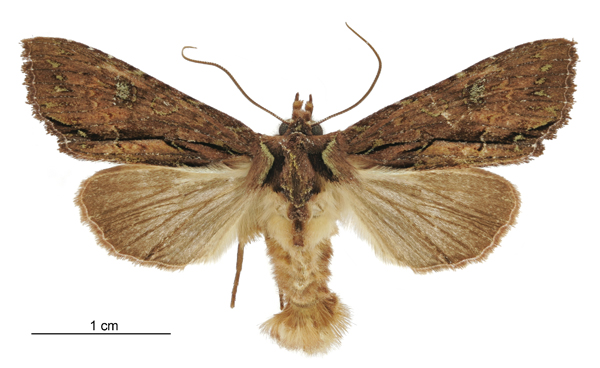
- Male

Scientific classification
- Kingdom: Animalia
- Phylum: Arthropoda
- Clade: Pancrustacea
- Class: Insecta
- Order: Lepidoptera
- Superfamily: Noctuoidea
- Family: Noctuidae
- Genus: Meterana
- Species: M. diatmeta

Binomial name
- Meterana diatmeta (Hudson, 1898)

Synonyms
- Melanchra diatmeta Hudson, 1898

= Meterana diatmeta =

Species of moth endemic to New Zealand

Meterana diatmeta is a species of moth in the family Noctuidae. This species is endemic to New Zealand.

Adults are attracted to light and have been collected via a mercury vapour light trap.
