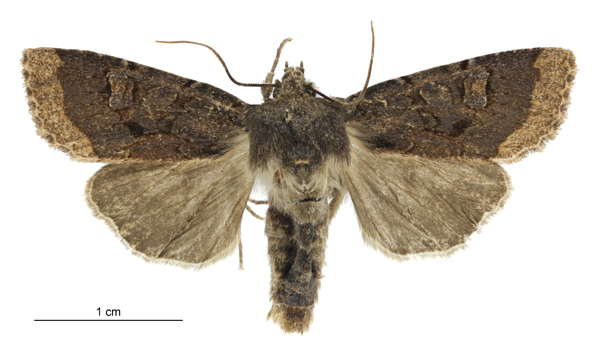
- Male
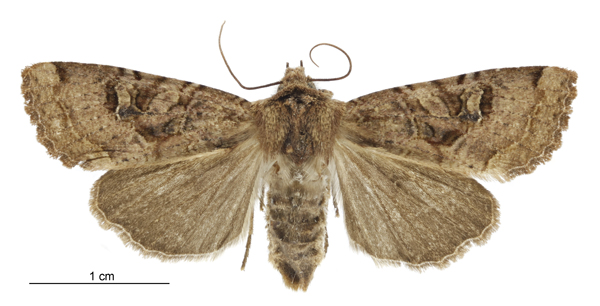
- Female

Scientific classification
- Kingdom: Animalia
- Phylum: Arthropoda
- Clade: Pancrustacea
- Class: Insecta
- Order: Lepidoptera
- Superfamily: Noctuoidea
- Family: Noctuidae
- Genus: Meterana
- Species: M. tartarea

Binomial name
- Meterana tartarea (Butler, 1877)

Synonyms
- Graphiphora tartarea Butler, 1877; Melanchra tartarea (Butler, 1877)

= Meterana tartarea =

Species of moth

Meterana tartarea is a moth of the family Noctuidae. It was described by Arthur Gardiner Butler in 1877. It is endemic to New Zealand.

They are attracted to light and have been collected via a mercury vapour light trap.
