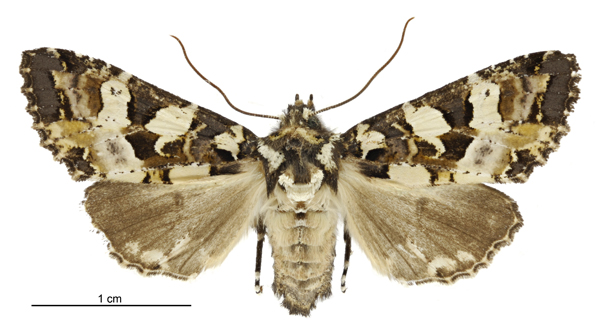
- Female
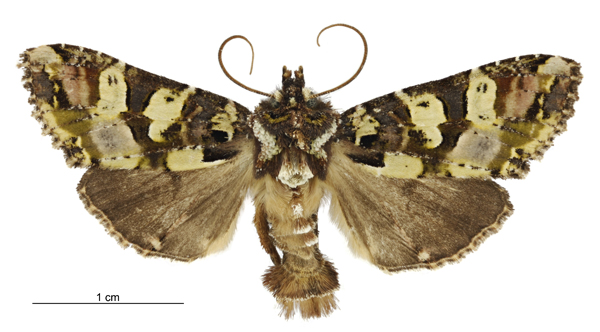
- Male

Scientific classification
- Kingdom: Animalia
- Phylum: Arthropoda
- Class: Insecta
- Order: Lepidoptera
- Superfamily: Noctuoidea
- Family: Noctuidae
- Genus: Meterana
- Species: M. pauca

Binomial name
- Meterana pauca (Philpott, 1910)

Synonyms
- Melanchra pauca Philpott, 1910

= Meterana pauca =

Species of moth

Meterana pauca is a moth of the family Noctuidae. It is endemic to New Zealand. It was described by Philpott in 1910 from two specimens held at the Otago Museum collected in the Wairarapa and a specimen he had collected in Wallacetown.
