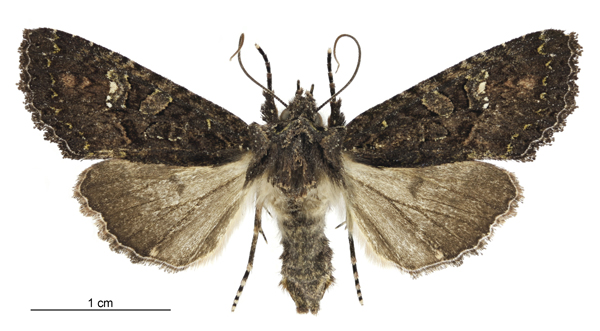
- Female
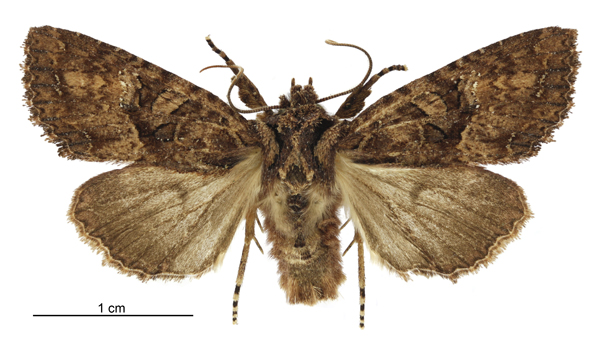
- Male

Scientific classification
- Kingdom: Animalia
- Phylum: Arthropoda
- Clade: Pancrustacea
- Class: Insecta
- Order: Lepidoptera
- Superfamily: Noctuoidea
- Family: Noctuidae
- Genus: Meterana
- Species: M. ochthistis

Binomial name
- Meterana ochthistis (Meyrick, 1887)

Synonyms
- Mamestra ochthistis Meyrick, 1887; Melanchra ochthistis (Meyrick, 1887)

= Meterana ochthistis =

Species of moth

Meterana ochthistis is a species of moth in the family Noctuidae. It was described by Edward Meyrick in 1887 from specimens obtained in Christchurch. It is endemic to New Zealand.

They are attracted to light and have been collected via a mercury vapour light trap.
