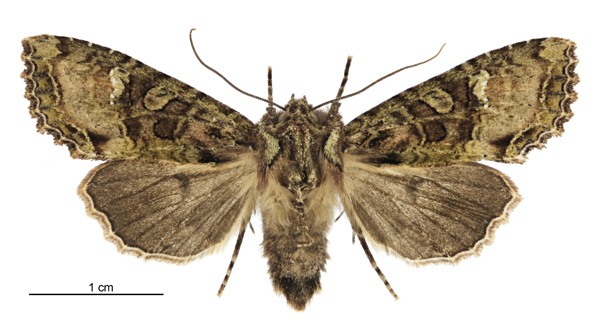
- Female
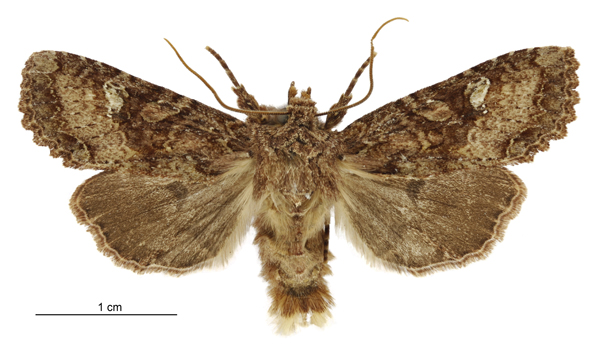
- Male

Scientific classification
- Kingdom: Animalia
- Phylum: Arthropoda
- Clade: Pancrustacea
- Class: Insecta
- Order: Lepidoptera
- Superfamily: Noctuoidea
- Family: Noctuidae
- Genus: Meterana
- Species: M. praesignis

Binomial name
- Meterana praesignis (Howes, 1911)

Synonyms
- Morrisonia praesignis Howes, 1911

= Meterana praesignis =

Species of moth

Meterana praesignis is a species of moth in the family Noctuidae. It was described by George Howes in 1911 from specimens collected in Orepuki in September and November. It is endemic to New Zealand.

Adults are attracted to light and have been collected via a mercury vapour light trap.
