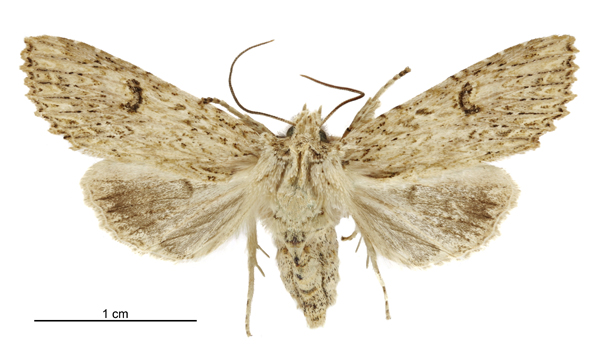
- Female
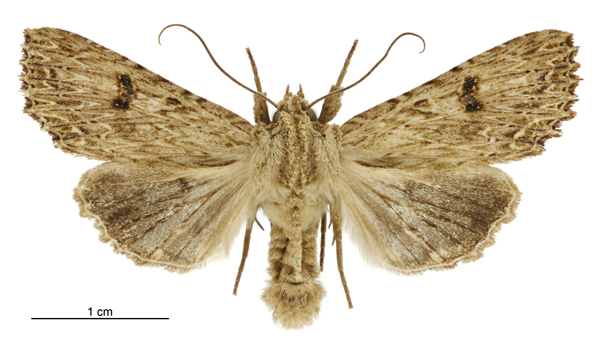
- Male

Scientific classification
- Kingdom: Animalia
- Phylum: Arthropoda
- Clade: Pancrustacea
- Class: Insecta
- Order: Lepidoptera
- Superfamily: Noctuoidea
- Family: Noctuidae
- Genus: Meterana
- Species: M. pansicolor

Binomial name
- Meterana pansicolor (Howes, 1912)

Synonyms
- Morrisonia pansicolor Howes, 1912

= Meterana pansicolor =

Species of moth

Meterana pansicolor is a species of moth in the family Noctuidae. It is endemic to New Zealand. This species is classified as "At Risk, Naturally Uncommon" by the Department of Conservation.

== Taxonomy ==
This species was described by George Howes and named Morrisonia pansicolor in 1912 from specimens collected in Dunedin in November. George Hudson, using the same name, described and illustrated this species in his 1928 book The Butterflies and Moths of New Zealand. In 1988 John S. Dugdale placed this species within the genus Meterana. The lectotype specimen is held at the Museum of New Zealand Te Papa Tongarewa.

== Description ==
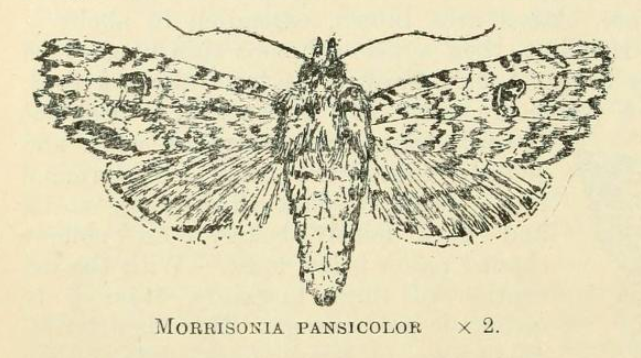
Meterana pansicolor illustrated by Howes

Howes described the species as follows:

29 mm. Head and thorax ochreous, slightly tinged with rufous. Antennae filiform, rufous. Crests well defined, dotted with rufous. Abdomen ochreous, in ♀︎ dotted with minute dark specks, ochreous-rufous in ♂︎, with strong crests, especially the anal. Forewings ochreous, suffused with rufous; all markings rufous. Subbasal line double, much broken, double line at 1/3 bending strongly outwards at centre of wing. A mark on costa at 1/2, followed by two marks over reniform, which continue through reniform as faint jagged lines across wing. An indistinct subterminal line formed by a series of dots. Orbicular obsolete. Reniform filled with dark rufous. Veins faintly marked with rufous. Cilia ochreous. Hindwings ochreous, centre of wing clouded with rufous brown. Discoidal spot well defined. A faint series of subterminal dots. Cilia whitish-ochreous, with a darker line at base. Underside pale ochreous. Curved post-medial line across both wings. Reniform and discoidal lunule well defined.

== Distribution ==
This species is endemic to New Zealand. It is only known from Dunedin and Central Otago.

== Biology and behaviour ==
Very little is known about the biology of this species. Adult moths emerge in spring. The adults are on the wing in October and November. The adult moths are attracted to sugar traps. Adults are attracted to light and have been collected via a mercury vapour light trap.

== Host species and habitat ==
The larvae of this moth feed on lacebark (Hoheria) species.

== Conservation status ==
This species has been classified as having the "At Risk, Naturally Uncommon" conservation status under the New Zealand Threat Classification System.
