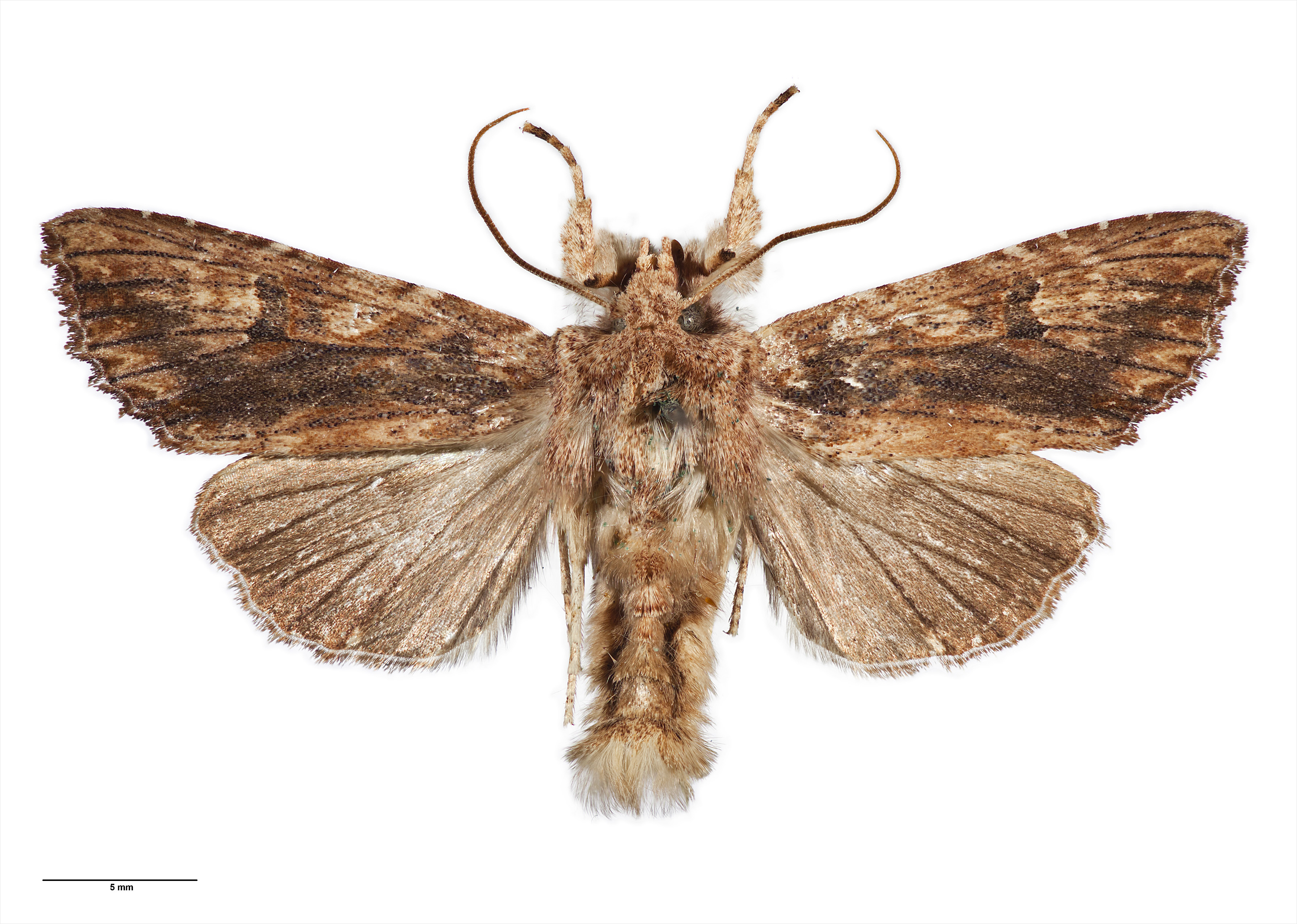
- Dorsal view of male Meterana pascoei specimen held at Auckland War Memorial Museum
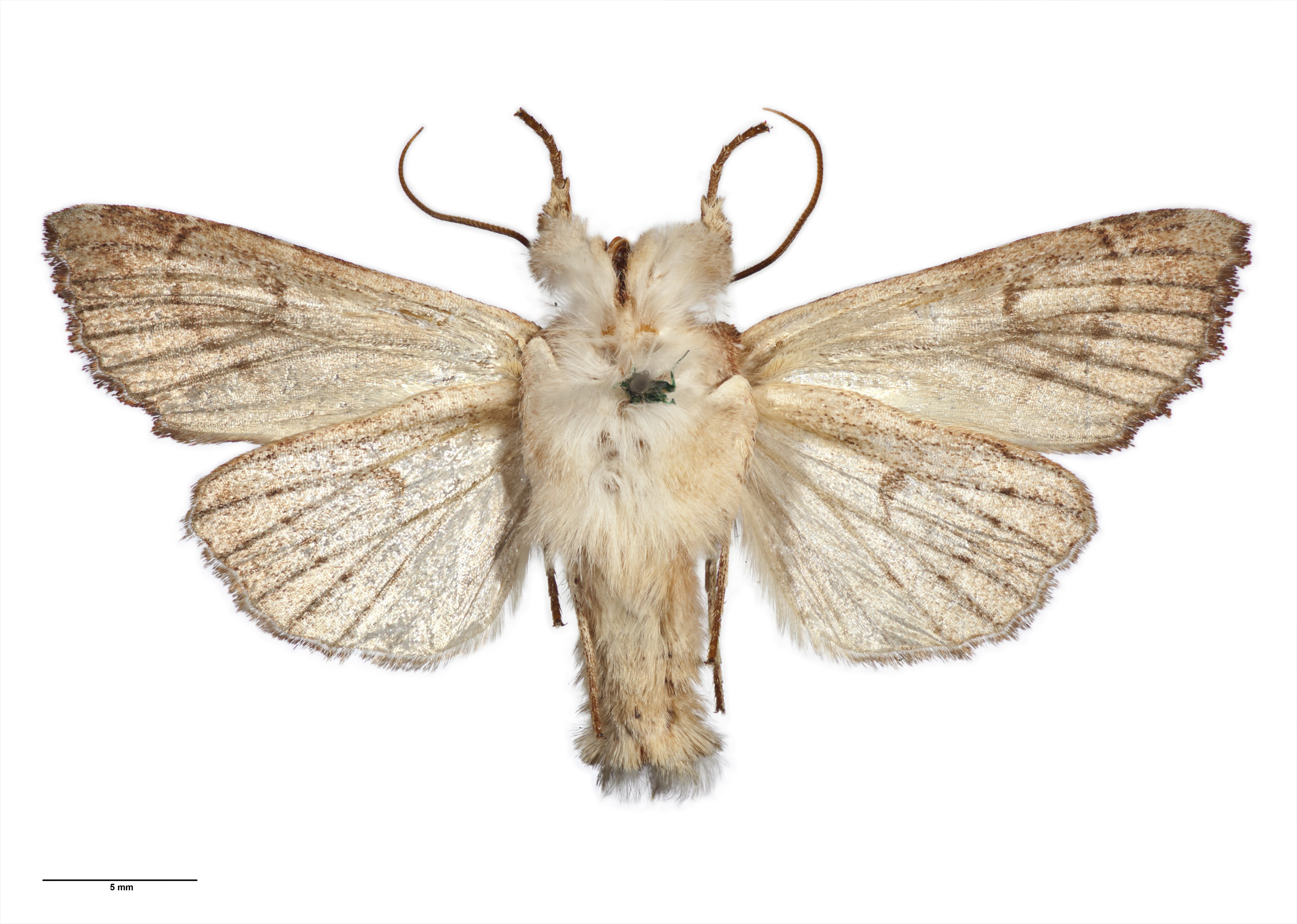
- Ventral view of male Meterana pascoei

Scientific classification
- Kingdom: Animalia
- Phylum: Arthropoda
- Clade: Pancrustacea
- Class: Insecta
- Order: Lepidoptera
- Superfamily: Noctuoidea
- Family: Noctuidae
- Genus: Meterana
- Species: M. pascoei

Binomial name
- Meterana pascoei (Howes, 1912)

Synonyms
- Morrisonia pascoei Howes, 1912

= Meterana pascoei =

Species of moth

Meterana pascoei is a moth in the family Noctuidae, endemic to New Zealand. The name and description were published as Morrisonia pascoei by William George Howes in 1912. It is about 38 mm long, with reddish-brown forewings marked with faint lines and a pair of kidney-shaped marks, and a reddish-brown abdomen with a pronounced tuft at the end. Howes named the species in honour of Merlin O. Pasco of Queenstown, who had sent him 20 specimens caught at a treacle-baited moth trap – Howes had previously collected just two specimens, in 1910.

== Nomenclature ==
In 1928, in his book The Butterflies and moths of New Zealand, George Vernon Hudson discussed this species, placing it within the genus Melanchra and edited the epithet to "pascoi". John S. Dugdale also used the epithet "pascoi" and proposed several new synonyms for this species in his 1988 publication Lepidoptera - annotated catalogue, and keys to family group taxa. Most institutions and databases such as the New Zealand Arthropod Collection, the New Zealand Threat Classification website, the entomological collections of the Museum of New Zealand Te Papa Tongarewa and the Auckland War Memorial Museum, continue to use the epithet "pascoi". The extra "e" added in Howes's original paper may have arisen from "Pascoe" being a more common form of the surname.

== Behaviour ==
Adults are attracted to light and have been collected via a mercury vapour light trap.
