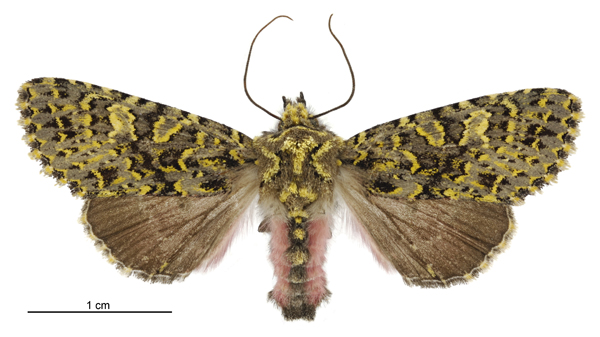
- Meterana pictula, type species

Scientific classification
- Domain: Eukaryota
- Kingdom: Animalia
- Phylum: Arthropoda
- Class: Insecta
- Order: Lepidoptera
- Superfamily: Noctuoidea
- Family: Noctuidae
- Subfamily: Noctuinae
- Genus: Meterana; Butler, 1877

= Meterana =

Genus of moths

Meterana is a genus of moths of the family Noctuidae. This genus is endemic to New Zealand.

== Species ==
The following species are placed within this genus:

- Meterana alcyone (Hudson, 1898)
- Meterana asterope (Hudson, 1898)
- Meterana badia (Philpott, 1927)
- Meterana coctilis (Meyrick, 1931)
- Meterana coeleno (Hudson, 1898)
- Meterana decorata (Philpott, 1905)
- Meterana diatmeta (Hudson, 1898)
- Meterana dotata (Walker, 1857)
- Meterana exquisita (Philpott, 1903)
- Meterana grandiosa (Philpott, 1903)
- Meterana inchoata (Philpott, 1920)
- Meterana levis (Philpott, 1905)
- Meterana merope (Hudson, 1898)
- Meterana meyricci (Hampson, 1911)
- Meterana ochthistis (Meyrick, 1887)
- Meterana octans (Hudson, 1898)
- Meterana pansicolor (Howes, 1912)
- Meterana pascoi (Howes, 1912)
- Meterana pauca (Philpott, 1910)
- Meterana pictula (White, 1855)
- Meterana praesignis (Howes, 1911)
- Meterana stipata (Walker, 1865)
- Meterana tartarea (Butler, 1877)
- Meterana vitiosa (Butler, 1877)
