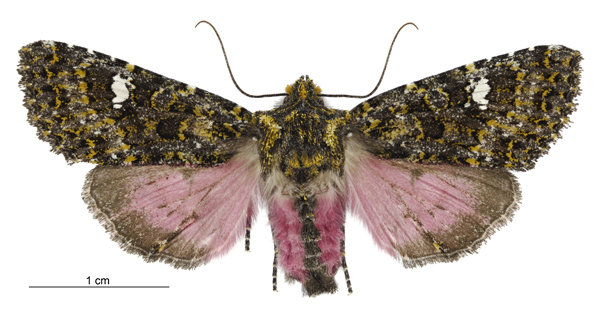
- Female specimen
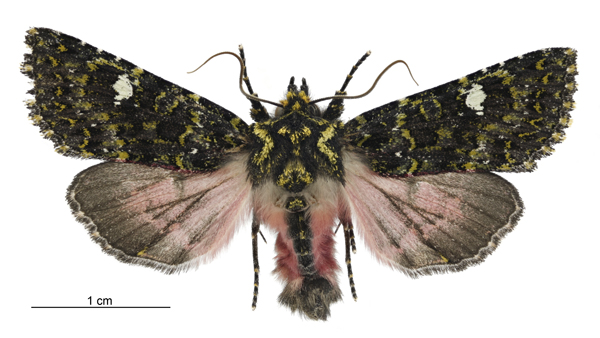
- Male specimen

Scientific classification
- Kingdom: Animalia
- Phylum: Arthropoda
- Class: Insecta
- Order: Lepidoptera
- Superfamily: Noctuoidea
- Family: Noctuidae
- Genus: Meterana
- Species: M. meyricci

Binomial name
- Meterana meyricci (Hampson, 1911)

Synonyms
- Miselia meyricci Hampson, 1911; Melanchra meyricci (Hampson, 1911)

= Meterana meyricci =

Species of moth

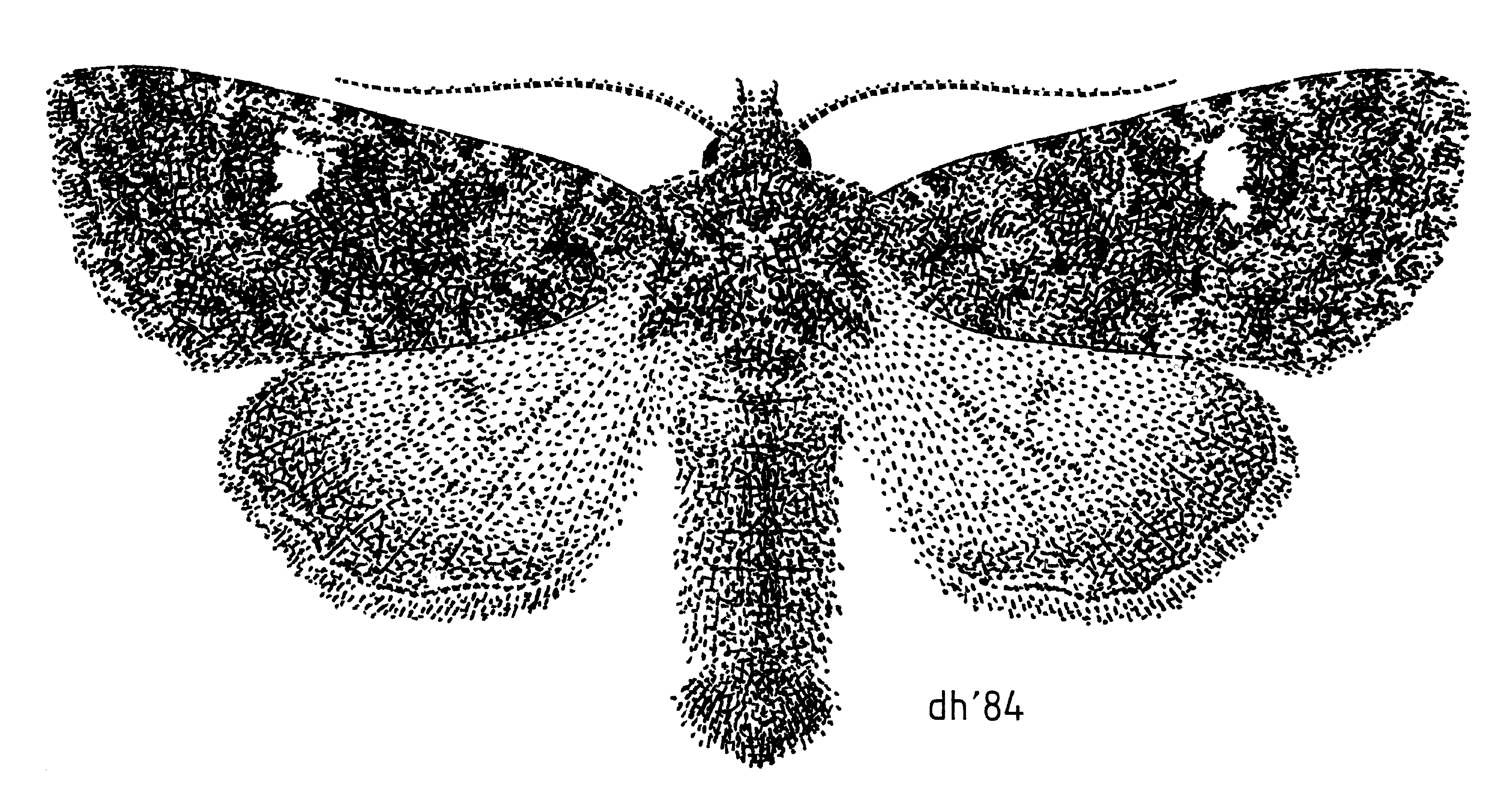
Meterana meyricci illustrated by Des Helmore

Meterana meyricci, also known as the rose underwing owlet, is a species of moth in the family Noctuidae. It was described and named by George Hampson in 1911 as Miselia meyricci. It is endemic to New Zealand and has been collected in and around Otago. The larvae of this species feed on Pimelea species, including Pimelea poppelwellii. Adults tend to found on the wing during the months of January to March.
