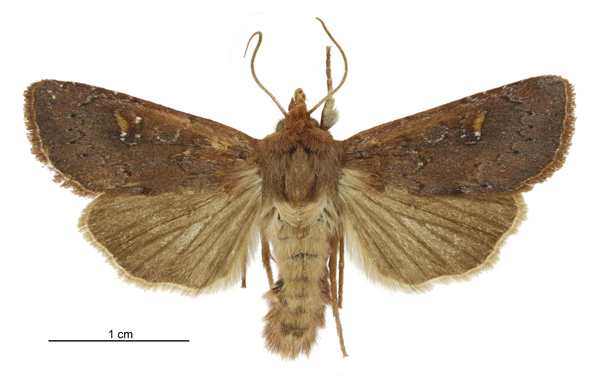
- Male
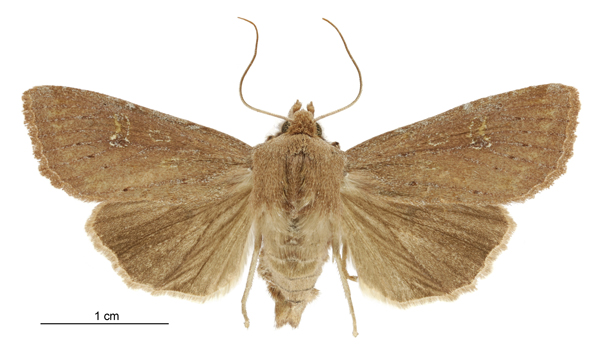
- Female

Scientific classification
- Kingdom: Animalia
- Phylum: Arthropoda
- Clade: Pancrustacea
- Class: Insecta
- Order: Lepidoptera
- Superfamily: Noctuoidea
- Family: Noctuidae
- Genus: Ichneutica
- Species: I. alopa

Binomial name
- Ichneutica alopa (Meyrick, 1887)

Synonyms
- Leucania alopa Meyrick, 1887; Graphania alopa (Meyrick, 1887); Tmetolophota alopa (Meyrick, 1887)

= Ichneutica alopa =

Species of moth

Ichneutica alopa is a moth of the family Noctuidae. It is endemic to New Zealand and is found in the central and southern parts of the North Island as well as in the South Island. It inhabits tussock grasslands and wetlands and can occur at ranges from the alpine zone down to almost sea-level. The life history of this species is unknown as are the host species of its larvae in the wild. Larvae of this species have been raised in captivity on Sphagnum moss as well as on species in the genus Raoulia. Adults of this species are on the wing from late January to April and are attracted to light and to sugar traps. I. alope can be confused with I. agorastis, I. micrastra or I. sapiens but the latter three species can be distinguished externally from I. alope through differences in size, forewing pattern and the antennae of the male of the species.

== Taxonomy ==
It was described by Edward Meyrick in 1887 from specimens collected near Lake Coleridge and Lake Guyon in Canterbury in March. Meyrick originally named the species Leucania alopa. The male lectotype is held at the Canterbury Museum.

J. S. Dugdale discussed this species in his 1988 catalogue and placed it within the Tmetolophota genus. In 2019 Robert Hoare undertook a major review of New Zealand Noctuidae. During this review the genus Ichneutica was greatly expanded and the genus Tmetolophota was subsumed into that genus as a synonym. As a result of this review, this species is now known as Ichneutica alopa.

== Description ==
Meyrick described the species as follows:

Male. — 41 mm. Head, palpi, and thorax reddish-fuscous, mixed with ochreous-whitish; face whitish-ochreous; thorax, posteriorly between patagia, grey- whitish. Antennae ochreous-whitish, flatly subdentate, moderately ciliated. Abdomen light grey, anal tuft whitish-ochreous, mixed with reddish. Legs reddish-ochreous, mixed with grey. Forewings moderately dilated, costa almost straight, apex obtuse, hindmargin waved, somewhat oblique, rounded beneath; reddish-fuscous, slightly ochreous-tinged; costa somewhat irrorated with whitish; a black dot towards inner margin at 1/3; reniform represented by a subcrescentic whitish-ochreous mark, bordered beneath by a cloudy dark-grey spot; a posterior curved series of obscure black dots : cilia reddish-fuscous, tips white. Hindwings dark grey; cilia ochreous-whitish, slightly reddish-tinged.

Both the adult male and female of this species have wingspans of between 39 and 45 mm. I. alope can be confused with I. agorastis, I. micrastra or I. sapiens but the latter species can be distinguished externally from I. alope through differences in size, forewing pattern and the antennae of the male of the species.

== Distribution ==
It is endemic to New Zealand. This species is found in the central and southern parts of the North Island as well as in the South Island.

== Habitat ==
This species inhabits tussock grasslands and wetlands and can occur at ranges from the alpine zone down to almost sea-level.

== Behaviour ==
Adults of this species are on the wing from late January to April. They are attracted to light and have been collected via a mercury vapour light trap and sugar traps.

== Life history and host species ==
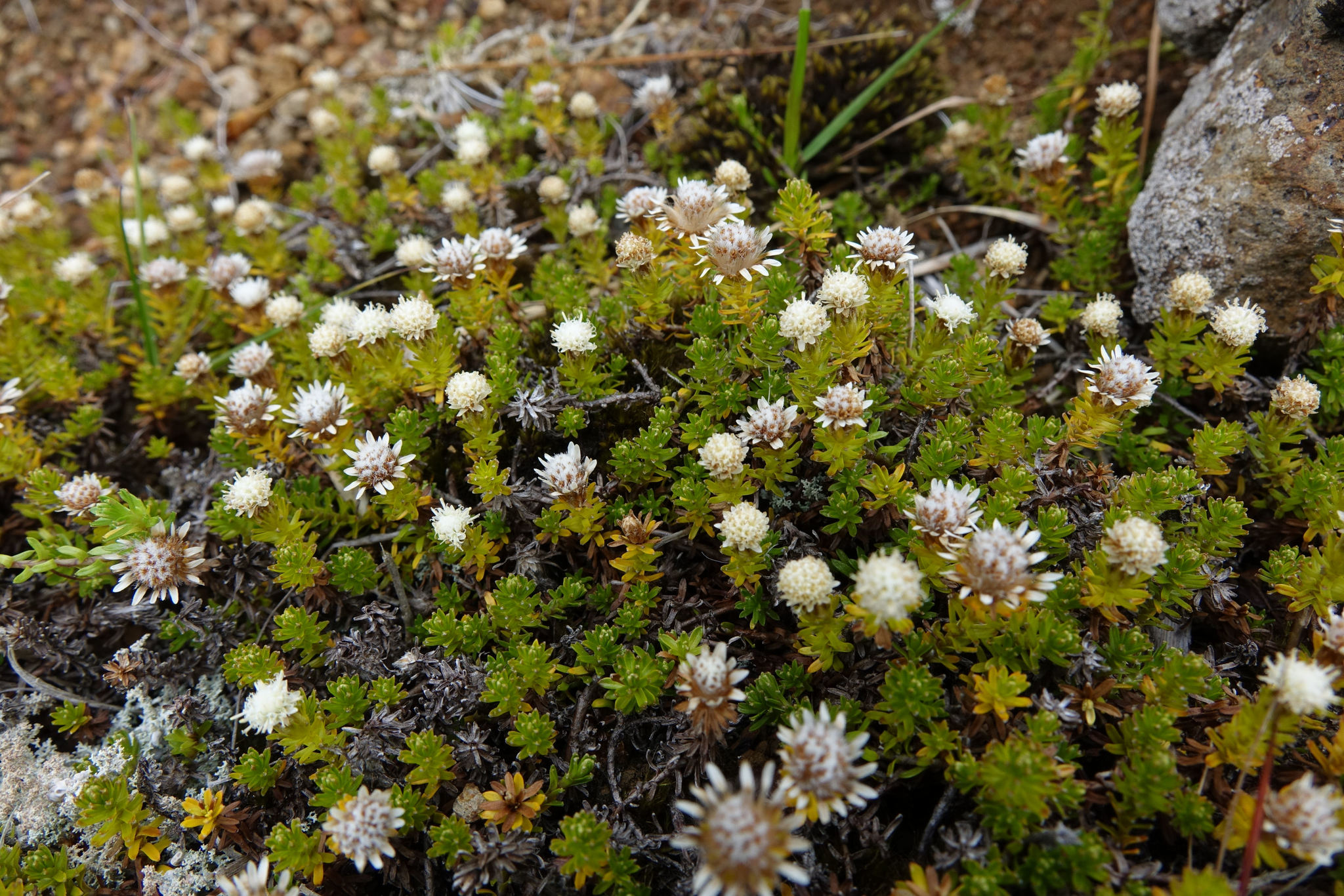
Raoulia species, a possible larval host for I. alopa

The life history of this species is unknown as are the host species of its larvae in the wild. Larvae of this species have been raised in captivity on Sphagnum moss as well as on species in the genus Raoulia.
