= Henry River =

Henry River may refer to:

- Henry River (New South Wales), Australia, a tributary of the Mann River
- Henry River (Western Australia), Australia, a tributary of the Ashburton River
- Henry River (New Zealand), New Zealand, a tributary of the Waiau River

== See also ==
- Henry River Mill Village, North Carolina, U.S.
