= Gloriana Peak =

Mountain in New Zealand

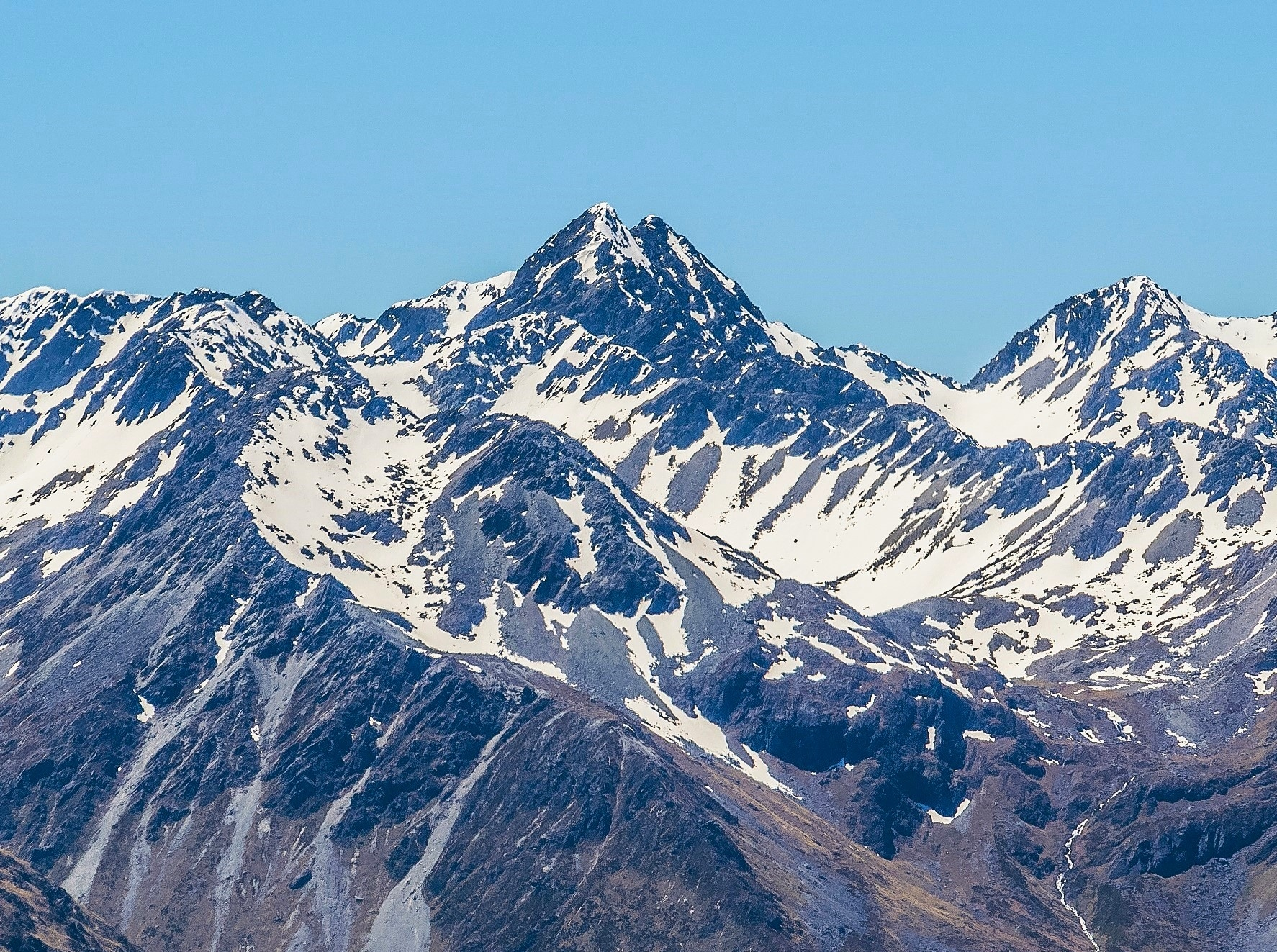
- Southwest aspect, centred

Highest point
- Elevation: 2,218 m (7,277 ft)
- Prominence: 198 m (650 ft)
- Parent peak: Faerie Queene
- Isolation: 2.28 km (1.42 mi)
- Coordinates: 42.26615°S 172.48748°E

Geography
- Location within New Zealand
- Interactive map of Gloriana Peak
- Location: South Island
- Country: New Zealand
- Region: Canterbury / Tasman
- Protected area: Nelson Lakes National Park
- Parent range: Southern Alps; Spenser Mountains
- Topo map: Topo50 BT23

Gloriana Peak is a 2,218-metre-elevation (7,277-foot) mountain in New Zealand.

== Description ==
Gloriana Peak is the fourth-highest peak in the Spenser Mountains, and 10th-highest peak in Nelson Lakes National Park. It is located 150 kilometres (93 mi) north of Christchurch and set on the boundary shared by the Tasman District and Canterbury Region of the South Island. Precipitation runoff from the mountain's north slope drains to the Mātakitaki River, whereas the south slope drains into the Ada River. Topographic relief is significant as the summit rises 1,300 metres (4,265 feet) above the Ada River Valley in three kilometres, and 900 metres (2,953 feet) above Camera Gully in 1.5 kilometre. The nearest higher neighbour is Faerie Queene, 2.28 kilometres to the east.

== Etymology ==
The Spenser Mountains are named after the poet Edmund Spenser. This peak's toponym comes from the character Gloriana who represents Queen Elizabeth I in his epic poem The Faerie Queene. This peak was named by William Travers, who named the Spenser Mountains, and he had an ancestral lineage to the Spenser family. This mountain's toponym has been officially approved by the New Zealand Geographic Board. In keeping with the naming theme in this range associated with the poetry of Edmund Spenser, other names in the Spenser Mountains derived from The Faerie Queene include Duessa Peak, Faerie Queene, and Mount Una.

== Climate ==
Based on the Köppen climate classification, Gloriana Peak is located in a marine west coast (Cfb) climate zone, with a subpolar oceanic climate (Cfc) at the summit. Prevailing westerly winds blow moist air from the Tasman Sea onto the mountains, where the air is forced upward by the mountains (orographic lift), causing moisture to drop in the form of rain or snow. The months of December through February offer the most favourable weather for viewing or climbing this peak.

== Climbing ==
Climbing routes:

- Matakitaki Routes
- Camera Gully Route
- Ada Pass Route

== Gallery ==
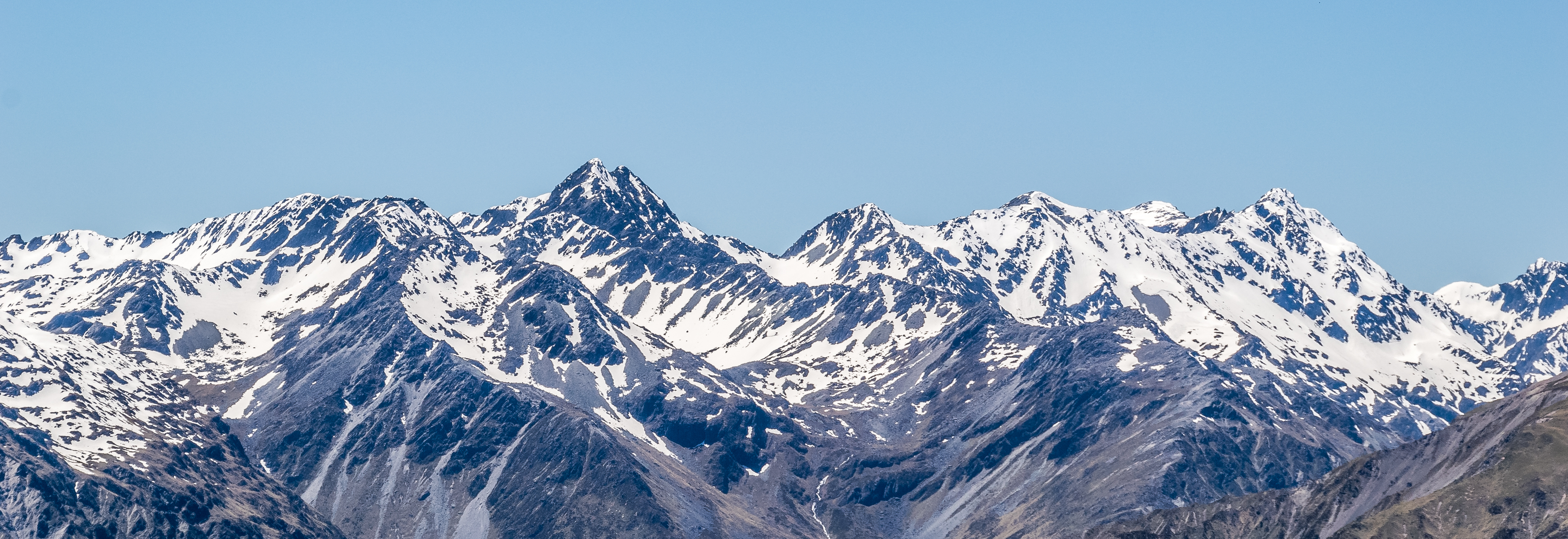
Gloriana Peak left of centre, Faerie Queene to right

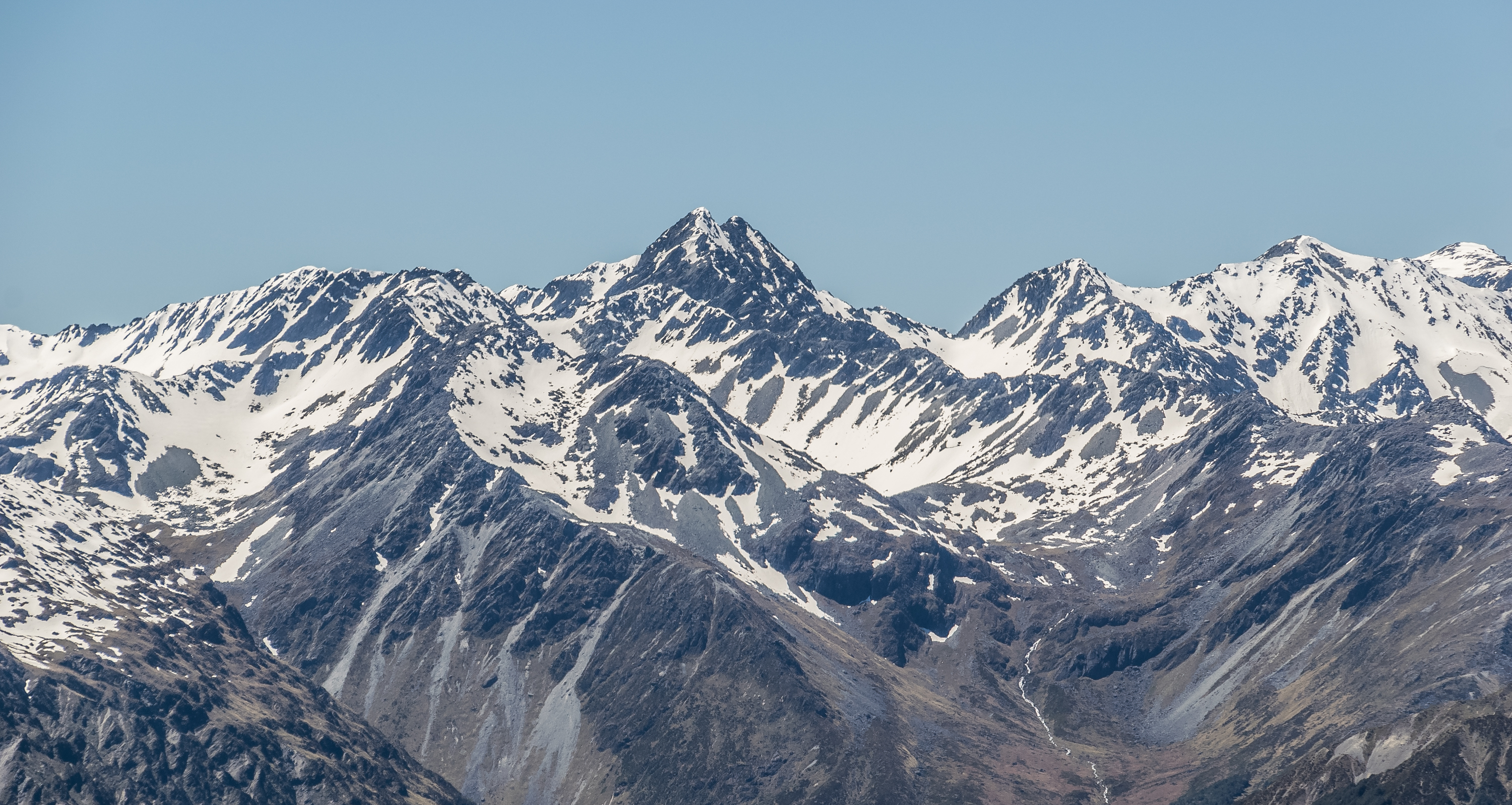
Gloriana Peak centred

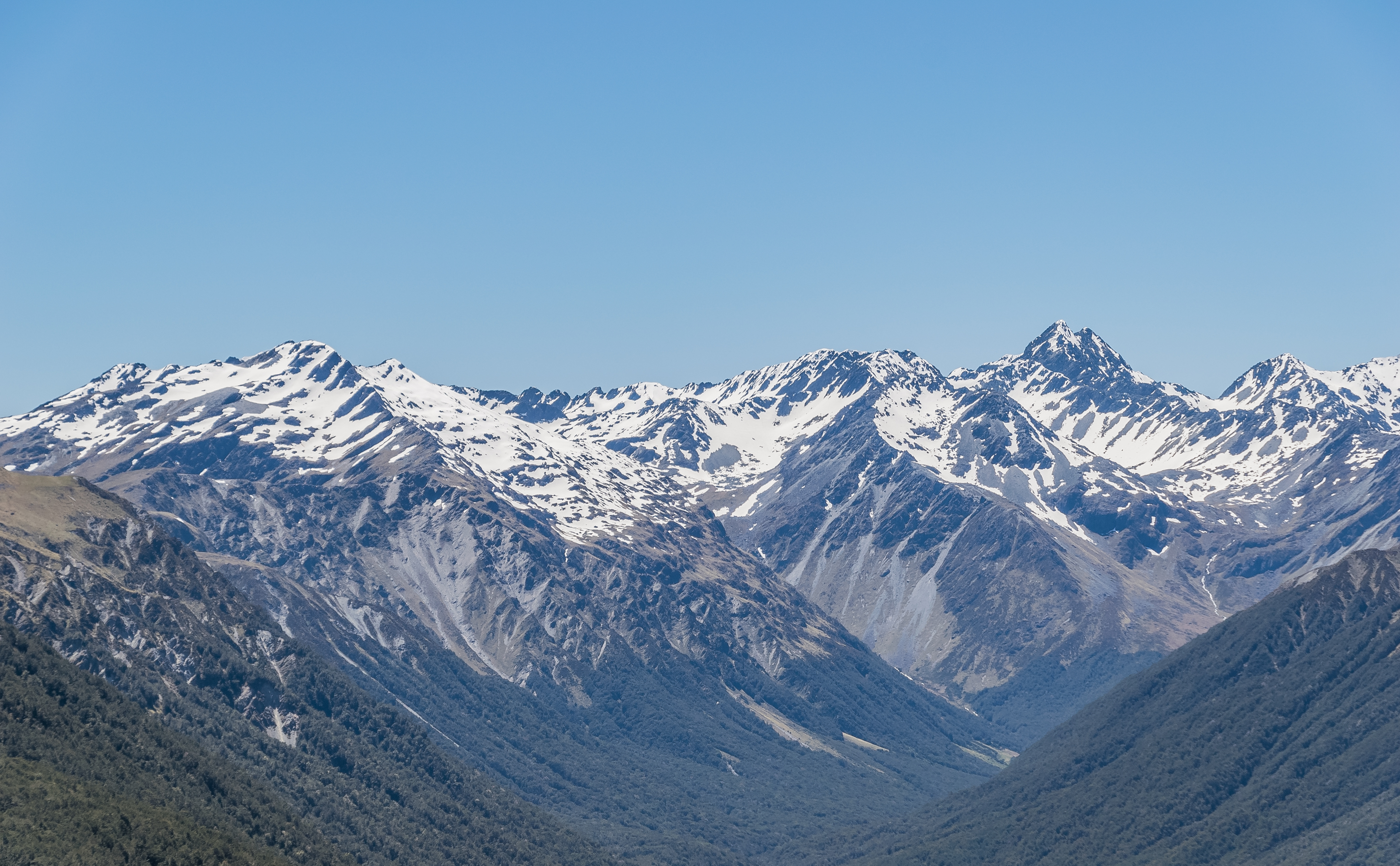
Gloriana Peak to right

== See also ==
- List of mountains of New Zealand by height
