= Mount Dora =

Mount Dora may refer to one of the following geographical locations:

- Mount Dora, Florida, a city in the United States
- Dorasan or Mount Dora, a hill in South Korea
- Mount Dora (New Zealand), a mountain in the Spenser Mountains of New Zealand's South Island
