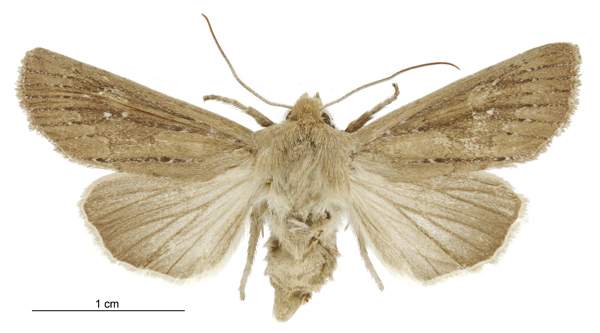
- Female
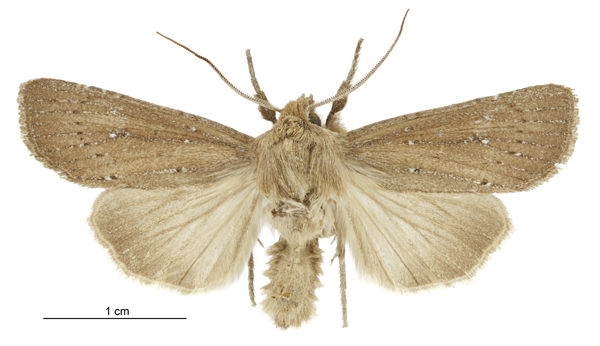
- Male

Scientific classification
- Kingdom: Animalia
- Phylum: Arthropoda
- Clade: Pancrustacea
- Class: Insecta
- Order: Lepidoptera
- Superfamily: Noctuoidea
- Family: Noctuidae
- Genus: Ichneutica
- Species: I. phaula

Binomial name
- Ichneutica phaula (Meyrick, 1887)

Synonyms
- Leucania phaula Meyrick, 1887; Leucania dunedinensis Hampson, 1905; Leucania neurae Philpott, 1905; Tmetolophota phaula (Meyrick, 1887); Graphania phaula (Meyrick, 1887); Graphania dunedinensis (Hampson, 1905); Graphania neurae (Philpott, 1905)

= Ichneutica phaula =

Species of moth

Ichneutica phaula is a moth of the family Noctuidae. It is endemic to New Zealand. It is found only in the South Island in the Nelson district, the eastern side of the South Island and Stewart Island. I. phaula inhabits tussock grasslands and coastal sand dunes. Host species include Ficinia spiralis, Ammophila arenaria, Poa cita and other "tussock grasses". The adults of this species are on the wing from October to December and are attracted to sugar traps. I. phaula is similar in appearance to both I. micastra, with whom it does not share a range, and I. sapiens which differs from I. phaula as I. sapiens is darker and has a more reddish tinge.

== Taxonomy ==
This species was described by Edward Meyrick in 1887 from specimens bred in tussock grass. The lectotype is held at the Canterbury Museum. In 1988 J. S. Dugdale placed this species within the Tmetolophota genus. In 2019 Robert Hoare undertook a major review of New Zealand Noctuidae species. During this review the genus Ichneutica was greatly expanded and the genus Tmetolophota was subsumed into that genus as a synonym. As a result of this review, this species is now known as Ichneutica phaula.

== Description ==
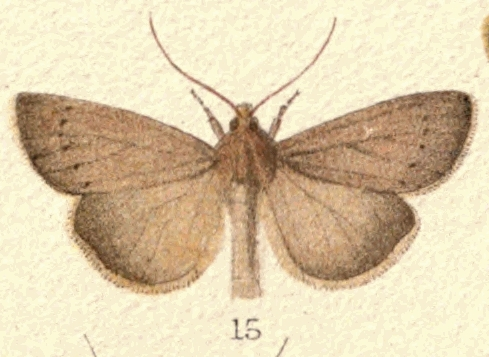
Ichneutica phaula illustrated by George Hudson.

Meyrick described this species as follows:

Male.— 38 mm. Head, palpi, antennae, thorax, abdomen, and legs light brownish-ochreous; antennae with moderate triangular longitudinal dentations, terminating in tufts of cilia. Forewings moderately dilated, costa almost straight, apex obtuse, hindmargin somewhat oblique, rounded beneath; rather light fuscous, ochreous-tinged; veins marked with scattered white and black scales; an obscure white dot at each extremity of transverse vein; a minute black dot towards inner margin at 1/3; a posterior series of obscure minute black dots, bent above middle : ciha fuscous, base more ochreous, tips whitish. Hindwings fuscous-grey, base somewhat lighter; cilia whitish-ochreous, with a faint grey line, tips more whitish.

The adult male has a wingspan of between 32 and 40 mm and the adult female has a wingspan of between 36 and 45 mm. This species is very similar in appearance to I. micastra, although the ranges of the two species appears not to overlap. I. phaula can be distinguished as there is a difference in pectinations on its antennae. Also both male and female I. phaula are lighter and less chunky than I. micastra. I. phaula is also similar to I. sapiens but I. phaula tends to be a paler species with I. sapiens having a more reddish tinge.

== Distribution ==
I. phaula is endemic to New Zealand. This species is found only in the South Island, in the Nelson district, on the eastern side of the South Island and on Stewart Island.

== Habitat ==
This species has been found in tussock grasslands as well as in coastal sand dunes.

== Behaviour ==
Adults of this species are on the wing from October to December. They are attracted to light and have been collected via mercury vapour light traps and sugar traps.

== Life history and host species ==
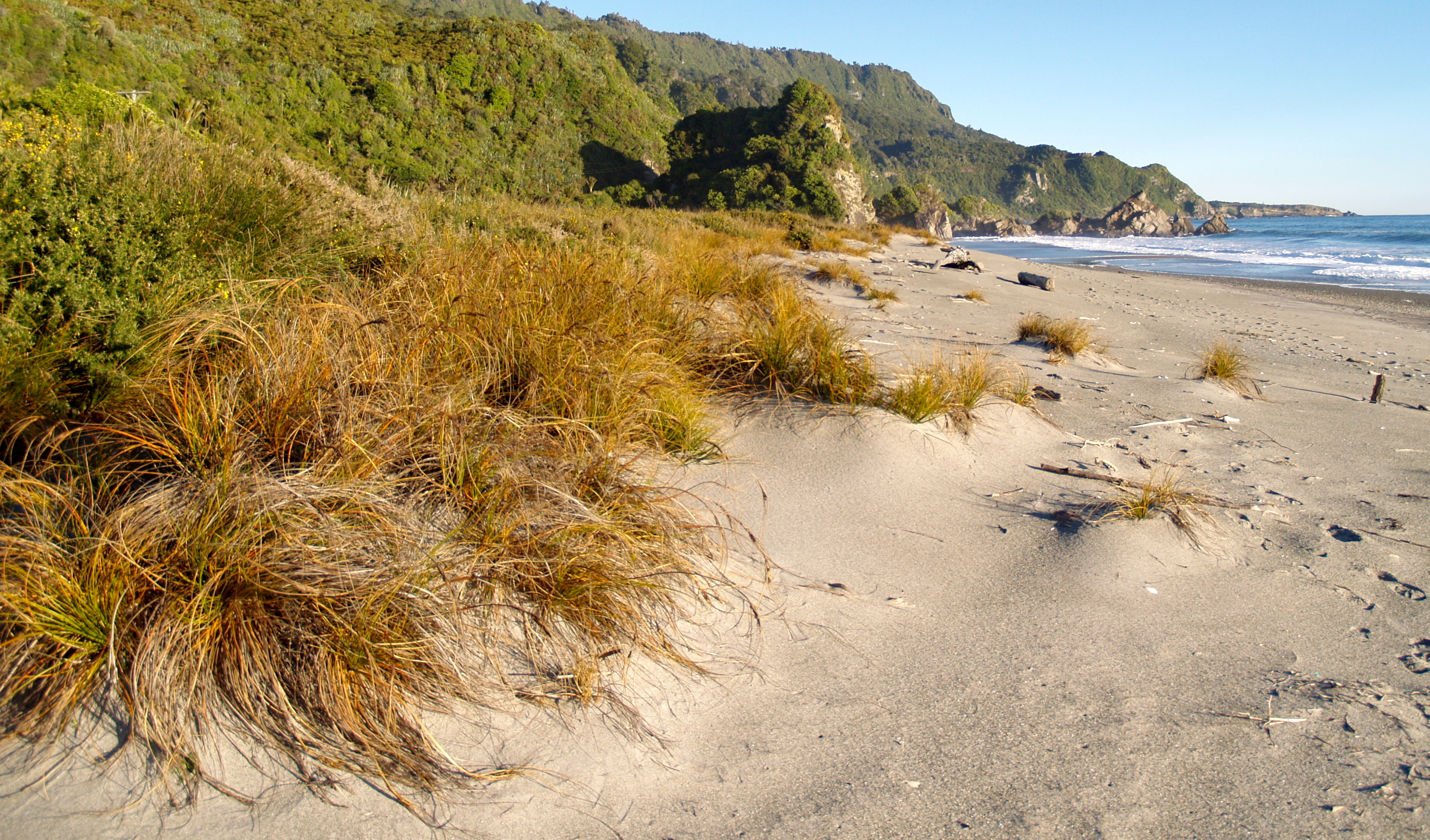
Pingao (Ficinia spiralis), a host species of I. phaula.

Some portions of this species life history is unknown but the larval host species include Ficinia spiralis, Ammophila arenaria, Poa cita and other "tussock grasses".
