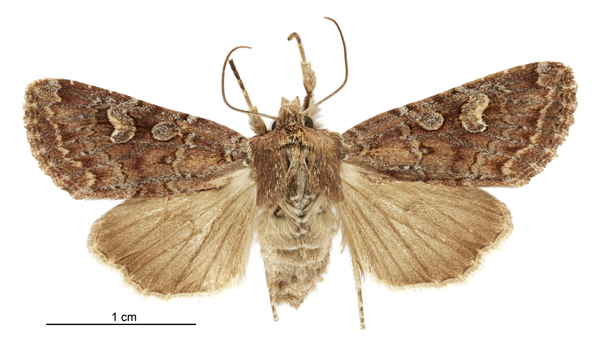
- Female
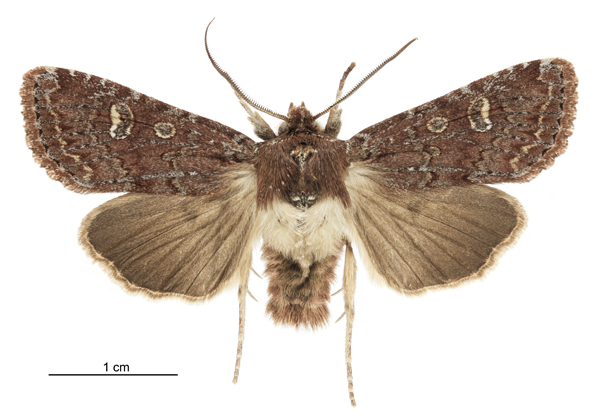
- Male

Scientific classification
- Kingdom: Animalia
- Phylum: Arthropoda
- Clade: Pancrustacea
- Class: Insecta
- Order: Lepidoptera
- Superfamily: Noctuoidea
- Family: Noctuidae
- Genus: Ichneutica
- Species: I. agorastis

Binomial name
- Ichneutica agorastis (Meyrick, 1887)

Synonyms
- Mamestra agorastis Meyrick, 1887; Graphania agorastis (Meyrick, 1887); Melanchra agorastis (Meyrick, 1887)

= Ichneutica agorastis =

Species of moth

Ichneutica agorastis is a moth of the family Noctuidae. This species is endemic to New Zealand. This moth is similar in appearance to two other species in the genus but can be distinguished through the colour and size of its forewings. This species is found in the South Island and Stewart Island in open habitats in the subalpine zone. However, in Southland I. agorastis can be found down to sea-level. Adult moths are on the wing between January and April. The life history and host species are unknown.

== Taxonomy ==
This species was first described by Edward Meyrick in 1887 from specimens collected at Lake Guyon and Akaroa and named Mamestra agorastis. The male lectotype specimen, collected by Richard William Fereday at Lake Guyon, is held at the Natural History Museum, London. In 1988 John S. Dugdale, in his catalogue of New Zealand Lepidoptera, placed this species within the Graphania genus. In 2019 Robert Hoare undertook a major review of New Zealand Noctuidae species. During this review the genus Ichneutica was greatly expanded and Graphania Hampson, 1905 was subsumed into that genus as a synonym. As a result of this review, this species is now known as Ichneutica agrorastis.

== Description ==
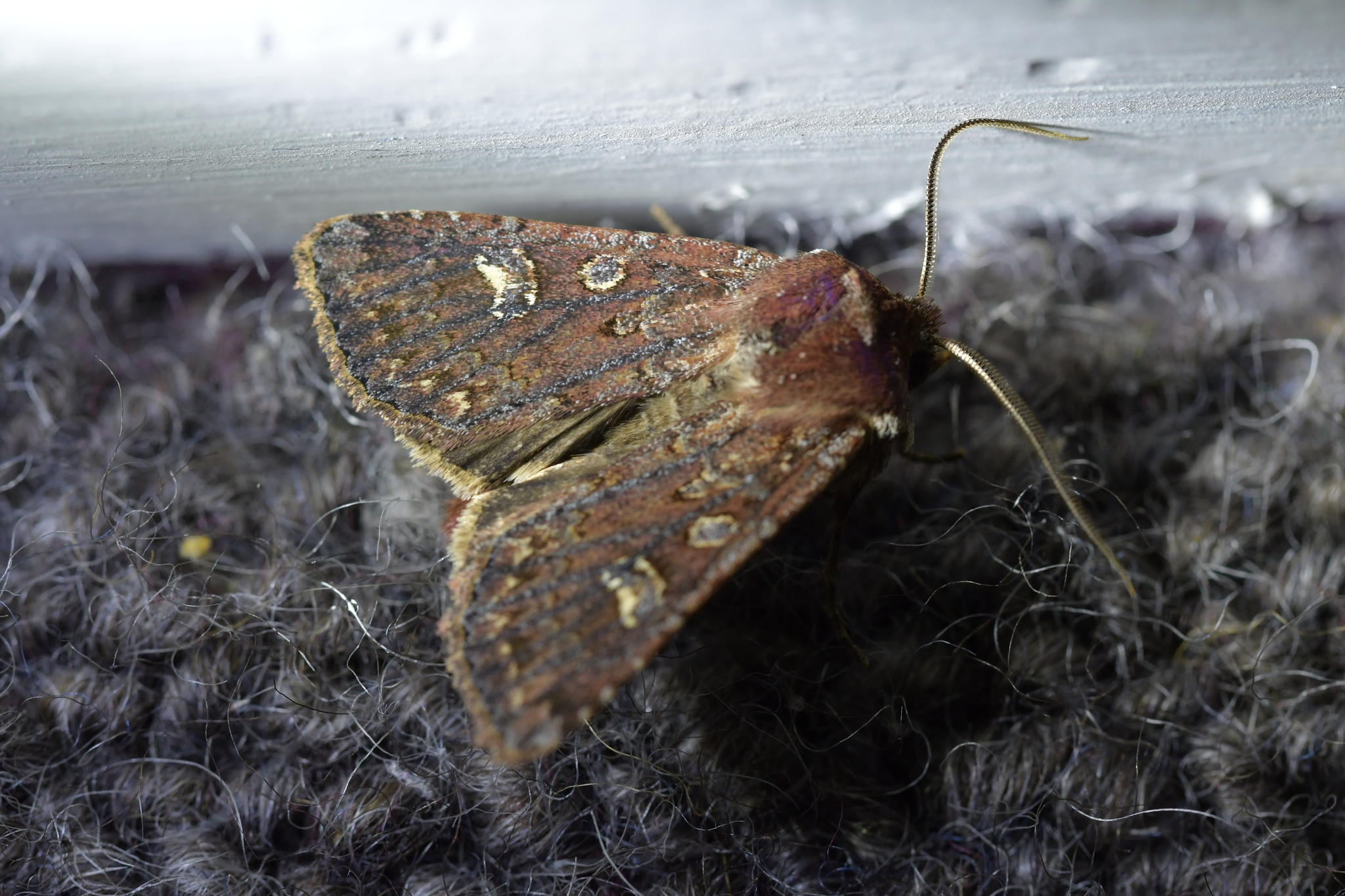
Ichneutica agorastis

Meyrick described this species as follows:

Male, female. — 35 mm. Head, palpi, and thorax reddish-fuscous; thorax with small anterior and median crests. Antennae fuscous, in male with rather short strongly ciliated pectinations. Abdomen grey, anal tuft light reddish. Legs reddish-fuscous, irrorated with ochreous whitish. Forewings moderately dilated, costa almost straight, apex obtuse, hindmargin waved, obliquely rounded; rather dark reddish-fuscous, lines greyish-tinged, edged with dark reddish-fuscous, tolerably defined; claviform small, obscure, greyish; orbicular and reniform dark grey, margined with white and then with dark reddish-fuscous, orbicular round, reniform oblong : a tolerably distinct median shade; subterminal whitish-ochreous, obscure, waved; a hind-marginal series of black lunules : cilia reddish-fuscous. Hindwings fuscous; cilia whitish, with a fuscous line.

I. agorastis is very similar in appearance to I. hartii and has also been confused with I. alopa. I. agorastis can be distinguished from I. hartii as the former species normally has a larger wingspan. I. agorastis also has a more reddish tinge to their forewings in comparison to I. hartii whose forewings tend to have a purplish colouration. I. agorastis can be distinguished from I. alopa as the former has more distinctive and paler crosslines on its forewings. The wingspan of I. agorastis is between 32 and 39 mm.

== Distribution ==
Ichneutica agorastis is endemic to New Zealand. It can be found in the South Island and Stewart Island, however the presence of this species in the North Island has yet to be confirmed.

== Habitat ==
This species can be found in subalpine zones in open habitats such as tussock grasslands but has been found as low as sea level in locations in Southland. Specimens have been collected in string mires.

== Behaviour ==
Adults of this species are on the wing from January to April. They are attracted to light and have been collected via a mercury vapour light trap.

== Life history and host species ==
The life history of this species is unknown as are the host species of its larvae.
