= Anne River =

Anne River may refer to:

- Anne River (New Zealand)
- Anne River (Tasmania)

== See also ==
- Ann Rivers (born 1968), American politician
- Ann River, Minnesota
