= Faerie Queene (mountain) =

Mountain in New Zealand

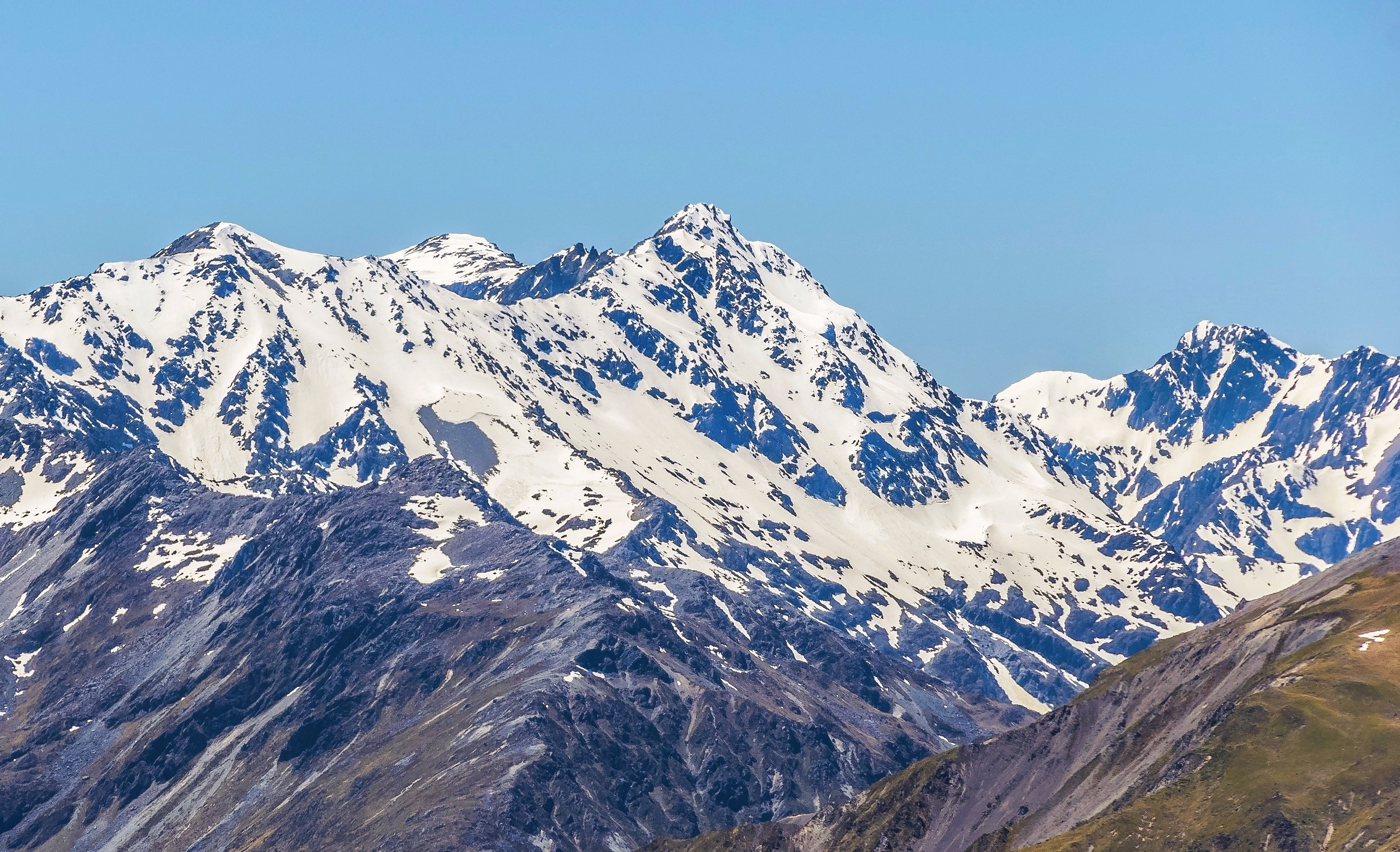
- Southwest aspect, centred

Highest point
- Elevation: 2,236 m (7,336 ft)
- Prominence: 416 m (1,365 ft)
- Isolation: 7.81 km (4.85 mi)
- Coordinates: 42°15′51″S 172°30′54″E

Naming
- Etymology: The Faerie Queene

Geography
- Location within New Zealand
- Interactive map of Faerie Queene
- Location: South Island
- Country: New Zealand
- Region: Canterbury / Tasman
- Protected area: Nelson Lakes National Park
- Parent range: Spenser Mountains
- Topo map: Topo50 BT23

Climbing
- First ascent: 1933

Faerie Queene is a 2,236-metre-elevation (7,336-foot) mountain in New Zealand.

== Description ==
Faerie Queene is the second-highest peak in the Spenser Mountains, and is situated on the boundary shared by the Tasman District and Canterbury Region of the South Island. This peak is located 150 kilometres (93 mi) north of Christchurch and set on the boundary of Nelson Lakes National Park. Precipitation runoff from the mountain's north slope drains to the Mātakitaki River, whereas the south slope drains into the Ada River. Topographic relief is significant as the summit rises 1,400 metres (4,593 feet) above the Ada River Valley in two kilometres. The nearest higher neighbour is Mount Una, 7.8 kilometres to the northeast.

== Etymology ==
The Spenser Mountains are named after the poet Edmund Spenser. This peak's toponym comes from his epic poem The Faerie Queene, in keeping with the naming theme in this range associated with the poetry of Edmund Spenser. Other names in the Spenser Mountains derived from The Faerie Queene include Duessa Peak, Gloriana Peak, and Mount Una. These peaks were probably named by William Travers, who named the Spenser Mountains, and himself had an ancestral lineage to the Spenser family. This mountain's toponym has been officially approved by the New Zealand Geographic Board.

== Climbing ==
Climbing routes:

- South East Face – R.S. Odell – December 1933
- Divide Route
- Matakitaki Routes

== Climate ==
Based on the Köppen climate classification, Faerie Queene is located in a marine west coast (Cfb) climate zone, with a subpolar oceanic climate (Cfc) at the summit. Prevailing westerly winds blow moist air from the Tasman Sea onto the mountains, where the air is forced upward by the mountains (orographic lift), causing moisture to drop in the form of rain or snow. The months of December through February offer the most favourable weather for viewing or climbing this peak.

== See also ==
- List of mountains of New Zealand by height
