= St James Walkway =

Tramping track in New Zealand

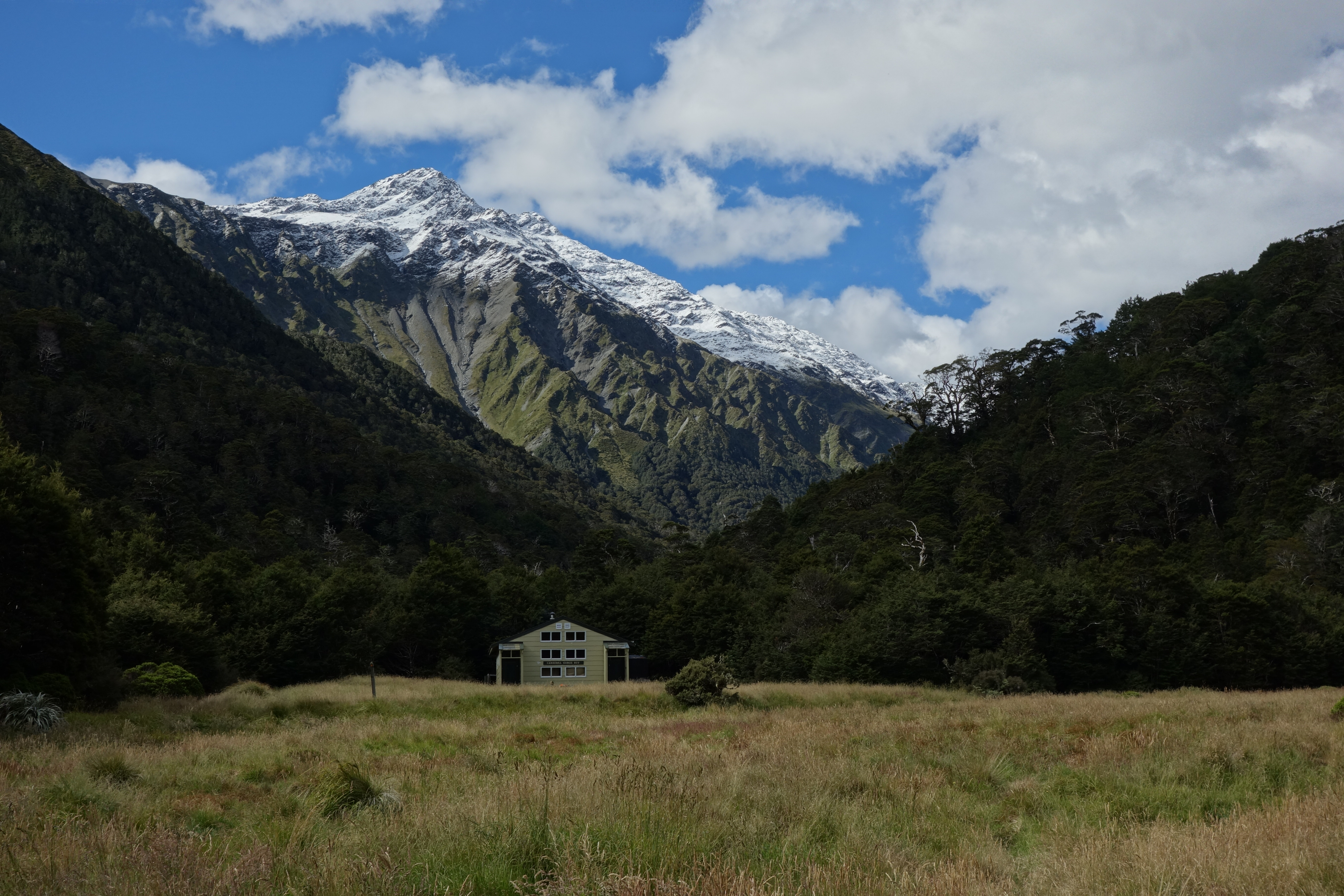
- Cannibal Gorge Hut on the St James Walkway in front of peaks of the Freyberg Range
- Length: 66 km (41 mi)
- Location: Lewis Pass National Reserve, St James Station
- Trailheads: Lewis Pass; 42°22′48″S 172°24′04″E; Boyle Village; 42°31′13″S 172°23′52″E
- Use: Hiking
- Highest point: 1,136 m (3,727 ft)
- Lowest point: 600 m (2,000 ft)
- Surface: natural
- Website: www.doc.govt.nz/parks-and-recreation/tracks-and-walks/canterbury/north-canterbury-and-arthurs-pass/st-james-walkway

The St James Walkway is a 66 kilometres (41 mi)-long subalpine tramping (i.e. the New Zealand term for 'hiking') track located in the Lewis Pass area of the South Island of New Zealand. It is administered by the Department of Conservation.

== History ==
The St James Walkway was the first walking track in New Zealand to be built in a sub-alpine area.

== Track description ==
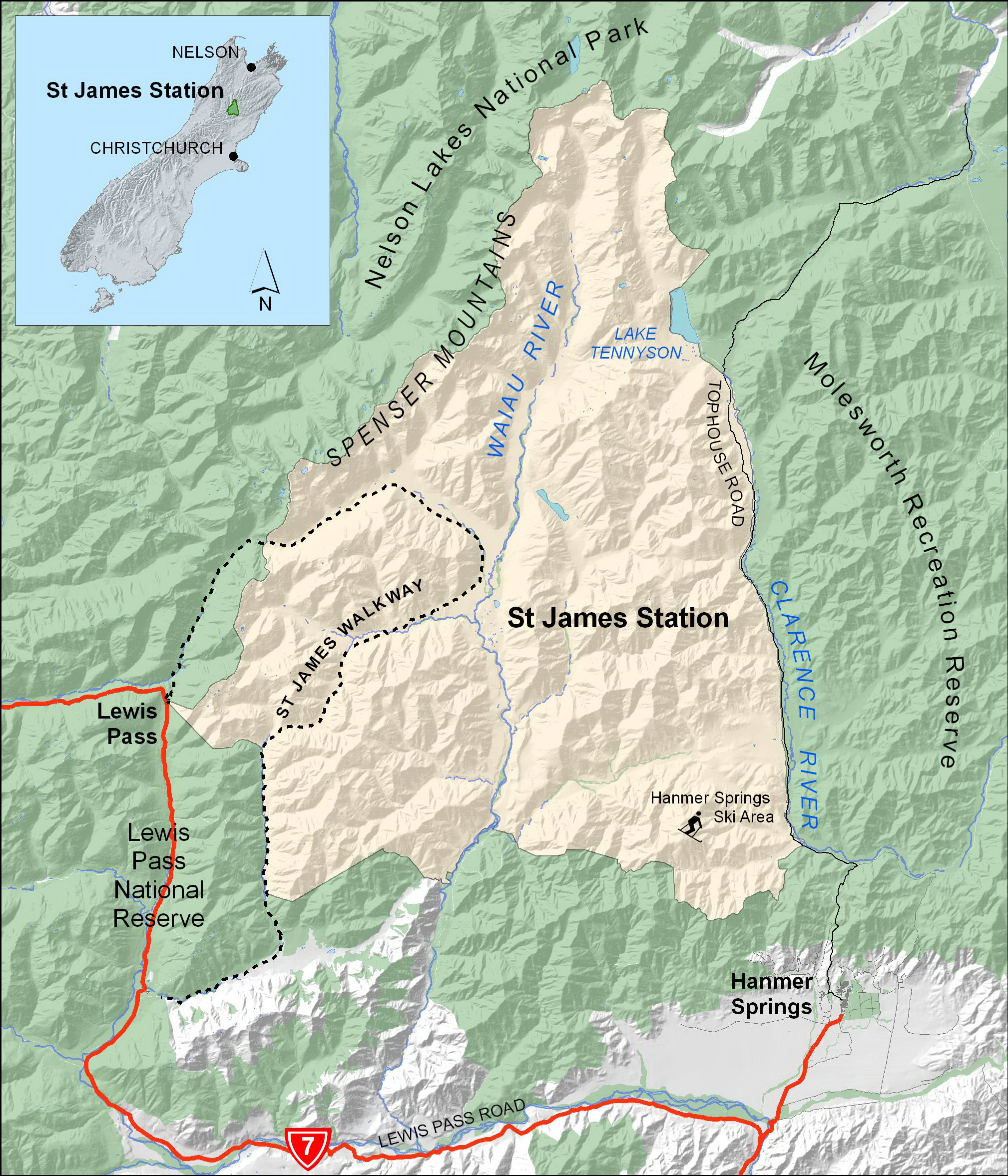
St James Walkway in relation to St James Station

The track starts near Lewis Pass and goes to Boyle Village and the Boyle River Outdoor Education Centre. The track ends are 16 kilometres (9.9 mi) apart via State Highway 7, and the Boyle Village parking area is considered more secure for leaving a vehicle.

At Lewis Pass, the track starts at 863 metres (2,831 ft) above sea level, and descends down to a swing bridge at Cannibal Gorge at 720 metres (2,360 ft). Cannibal Gorge is formed by the right branch of the Maruia River, and the track follows it to Cannibal Gorge Hut and continues to Ada Hut at Ada Pass at 1,008 metres (3,307 ft). From there, the track follows the Ada River to the historic Christopher Cullers Hut, and the Christopher Hut. The Ada River flows into the Waiau Uwha River, where the St James Walkway descends to 740 metres (2,430 ft), passing near the Ada homestead. The track then climbs along the Henry River to Anne Hut and Anne Saddle at 1,136 metres (3,727 ft). From here, the track follows the Boyle River and reaches Rokeby Hut, Boyle Flat Hut, and eventually its terminus at Boyle Village at 600 metres (2,000 ft) above sea level.

Five of the huts are serviced, i.e. firewood or coal is provided, and 14 to 20 bunks are available: Cannibal Gorge, Ada Pass, Christopher, Anne and Boyle Flat huts. Christopher Cullers and Rokeby huts are basic huts with four and three bunks, respectively.

Part of St James Walkway passes through the former St James Station. More than half of the track is part of Te Araroa, which joins between Christopher and Anne Huts at the Waiau River.
