= Anne River (New Zealand) =

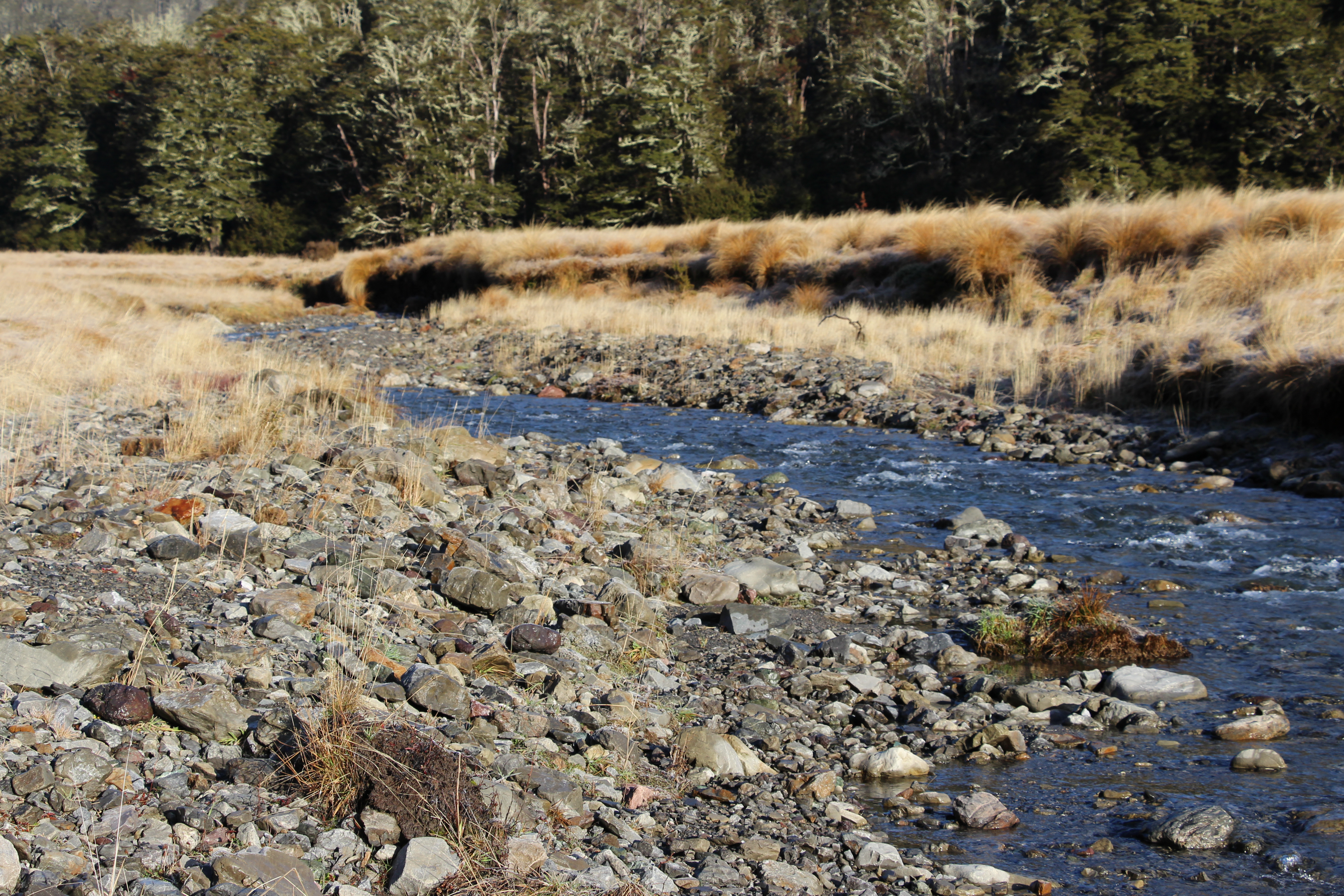
- Anne River

Location
- Country: New Zealand

Physical characteristics
- Mouth
  - location: Henry River
  - elevation: 860 m (2,820 ft)

The Anne River is a small river in Canterbury, New Zealand. It rises near the Anne Saddle and flows east then north for approximately 6 kilometres (4 mi) until it meets the Henry River, itself a tributary of the Waiau Uwha River. The St James Walkway, a popular tramping track, follows the Anne River for its entire length, and the Anne Huts are located near the river's mouth.

== Location ==
- 42°23′51.59″S 172°28′41.93″E — Head
- 42°21′6.78″S 172°31′9.16″E — Mouth

== See also ==
- List of rivers of New Zealand
