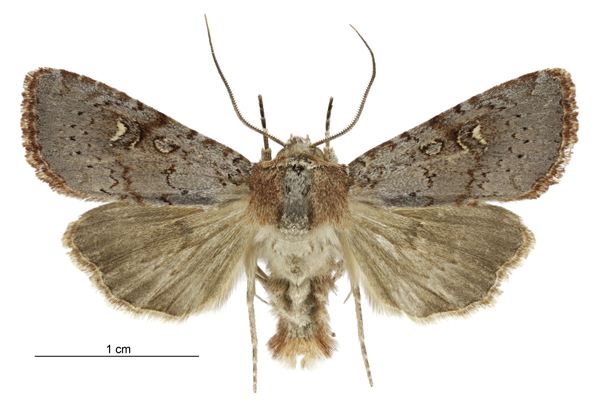
- Male
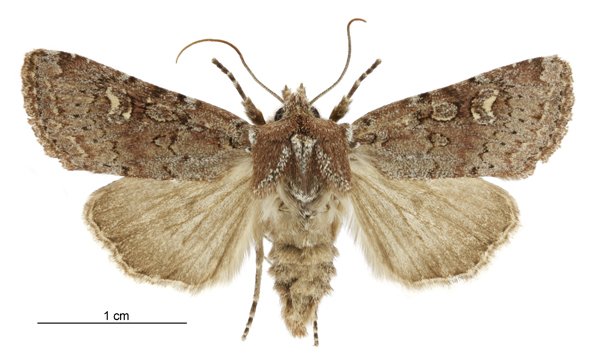
- Female

Scientific classification
- Kingdom: Animalia
- Phylum: Arthropoda
- Clade: Pancrustacea
- Class: Insecta
- Order: Lepidoptera
- Superfamily: Noctuoidea
- Family: Noctuidae
- Genus: Ichneutica
- Species: I. hartii

Binomial name
- Ichneutica hartii (Howes, 1914)

Synonyms
- Leucania hartii Howes, 1914; Leucania harti (Howes, 1914); Tmetolophota hartii (Howes, 1914)

= Ichneutica hartii =

Species of moth

Ichneutica hartii is a moth of the family Noctuidae. This species is endemic to New Zealand and can be found only in the North Island. I. hartii is similar in appearance to Ichneutica agrorastis but can be distinguished as it tends to be smaller in size and have a more purplish shade to its fore wings. I. hartii tends to be found inhabiting lowland native forest or forests found in the hilly ranges of the North Island. It is attracted to light and the adults of this moth are on the wing between January and March. Much of its life history is currently unknown as are the larvae host species.

== Taxonomy ==
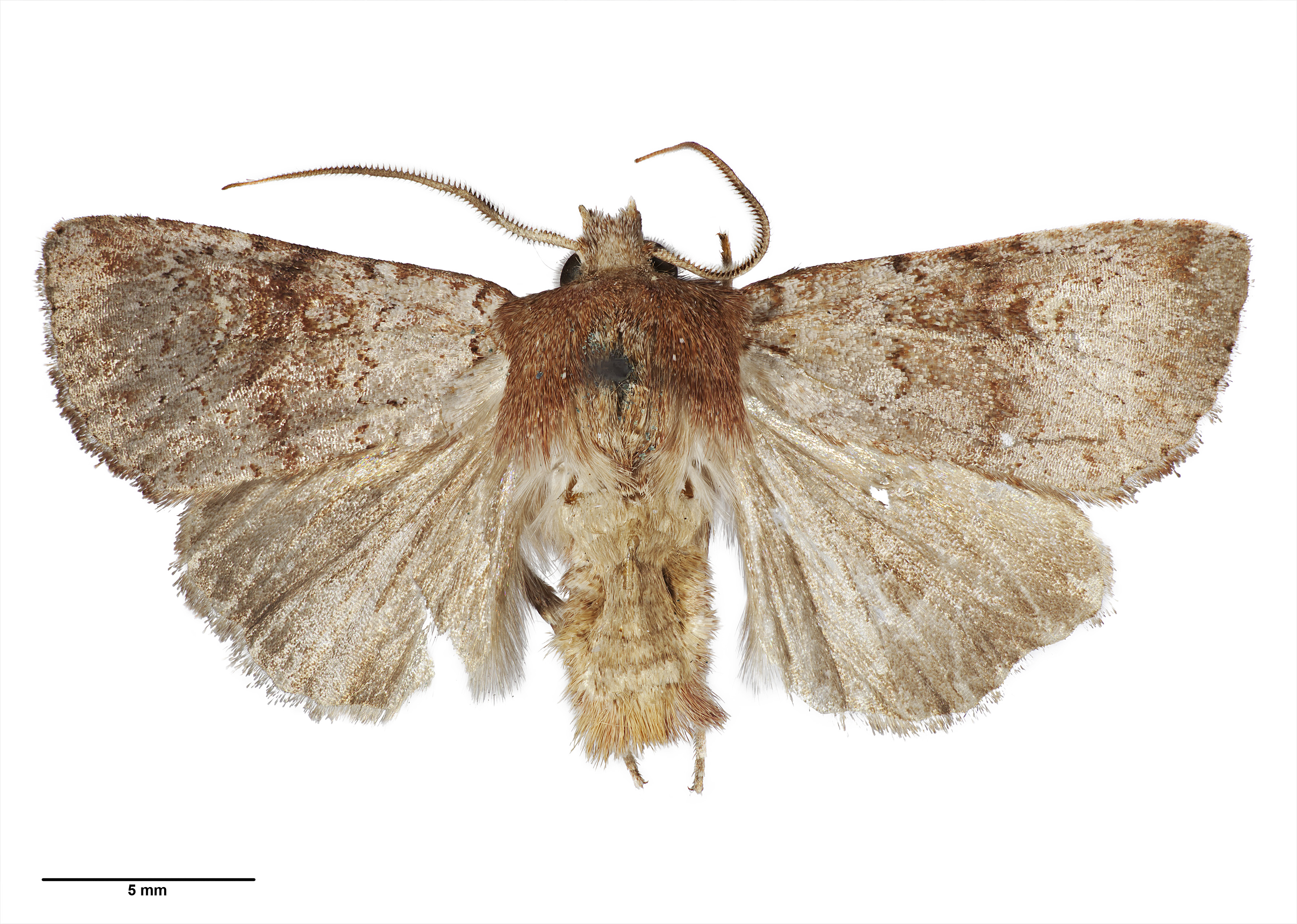
Ichneutica hartii male holotype

This species was first described by W. G. Howes in 1914 from a single male specimen obtained by Mr S. Hart near Cape Egmont Lighthouse. This holotype species is held at the Auckland War Memorial Museum. In 1988 J. S. Dugdale placed this species within the Tmetolophota genus. In 2019 Robert Hoare undertook a major review of New Zealand Noctuidae species. During this review the genus Ichneutica was greatly expanded and the genus Tmetolophota was subsumed into that genus as a synonym. As a result of this review, this species is now known as Ichneutica hartii.

== Description ==
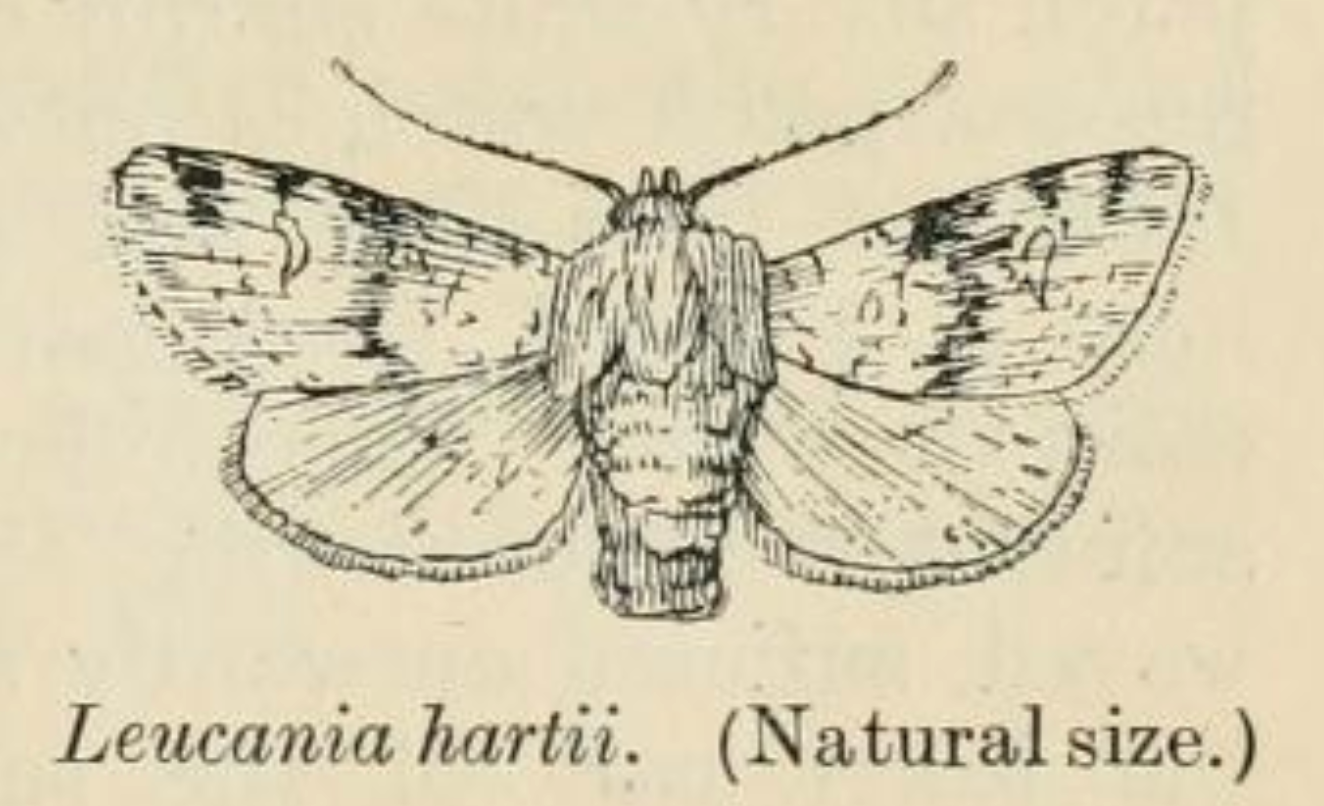
Leucania hartii by George Howes

Howes described this species as follows

♀; 32 mm.; one specimen. Face brown, faintly irrorated with grey. Head grey-brown. Palpi and antennae ochreous brown. Thorax brown, crests absent. Abdomen grey-brown, tufts rufous. Forewings covered with dull silvery (lead-coloured) scales, the rather indistinct lines being bright rufous. Two distinct marks on costa close to base, being portion of a broken indistinct line across wing. At 1/3 there are two other distinct marks on costa, continuing as ill-defined lines across wing. Orbicular and claviform outlined in rufous. Orbicular elongate. A very distinct line crosses between reniform and orbicular, running straight across save for a slight outward bend at wing-centre. Reniform has an ocnreous lunate mark in centre, margined by rufous on basal side, and also outwardly, but outwardly is not distinctly defined. Close to termen there are faint traces of a rufous line; a series of slight rufous dots along termen. Cilia light ochreous, with an ochreous line at base. Hindwings ochreous, slightly rufous towards termen. Cilia dull rufous, with an ochreous line at base.

I. hartii is closely related to I. agorastis and as such is very similar in appearance. I.hartii can be distinguished from I. agorastis as the former has a smaller wingspan with an approximate size of 33 mm. However in the central North Island some specimens are of a larger size than this norm. I. hartii also has a more purplish shade to its forewings in comparison to the reddish shade of I. agorastis.

== Distribution ==
It is endemic to New Zealand and is widespread in the North Island.

== Habitat ==
This species can be found in lowland native forest as well as in hill ranges up to approximately 800m in altitude.

== Behaviour ==
Adults of this species are on the wing from January to March. This species is attracted to light.

== Life history and host species ==
The life history of this species is unknown as are the host species of its larvae.
