= St James Station, New Zealand =

Former high country station – now conservation land

Coordinates: 42.440941°S 172.46303°E

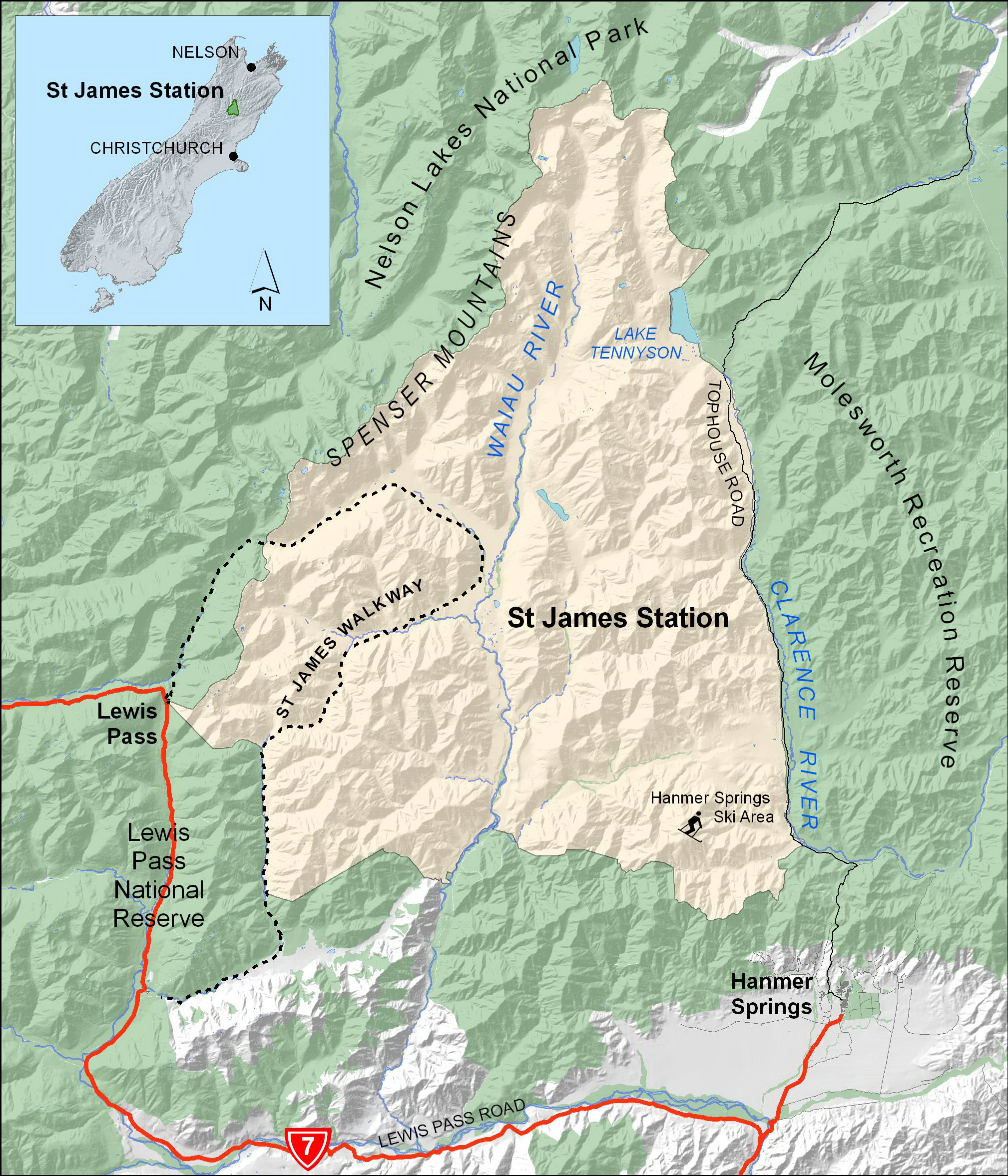
St James Station as purchased in 2008

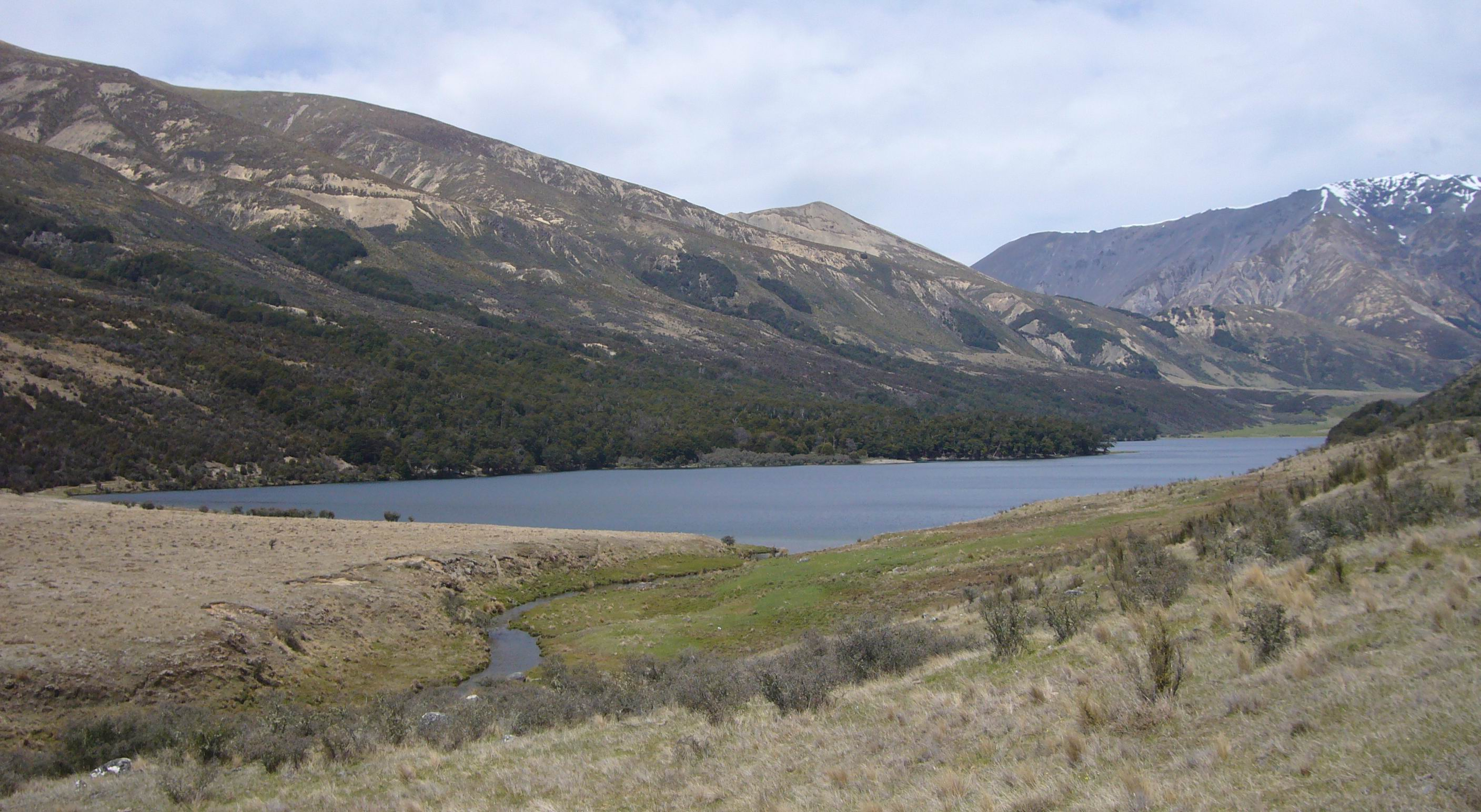
Lake Guyon is within the boundaries of the St James Conservation Area

St James Station is a former high country sheep and cattle station in the South Island of New Zealand. It was renowned for its horse sales and covered an area of 78,196 hectares (193,230 acres). It is now referred to as the St James Conservation Area and is managed by the Department of Conservation.

The station was purchased for $40 million by the government in 2008 using funds from the Nature Heritage Fund, as well as from Land Information New Zealand. It had been owned by the Stevenson family since 1927. The government's purchase was a means of protection from intensive farming and development as well as guaranteeing public access.

The St James Walkway is a popular tramping track that passes through the area. The New Zealand Cycle Trail, announced by the Prime Minister as a boost for the economy, received funding for a St James Cycle Trail, which traverses part of the station.

== See also ==
- Agriculture in New Zealand
- Protected areas of New Zealand
