= Henry River (New Zealand) =

Coordinates: 42°21′S 172°36′E

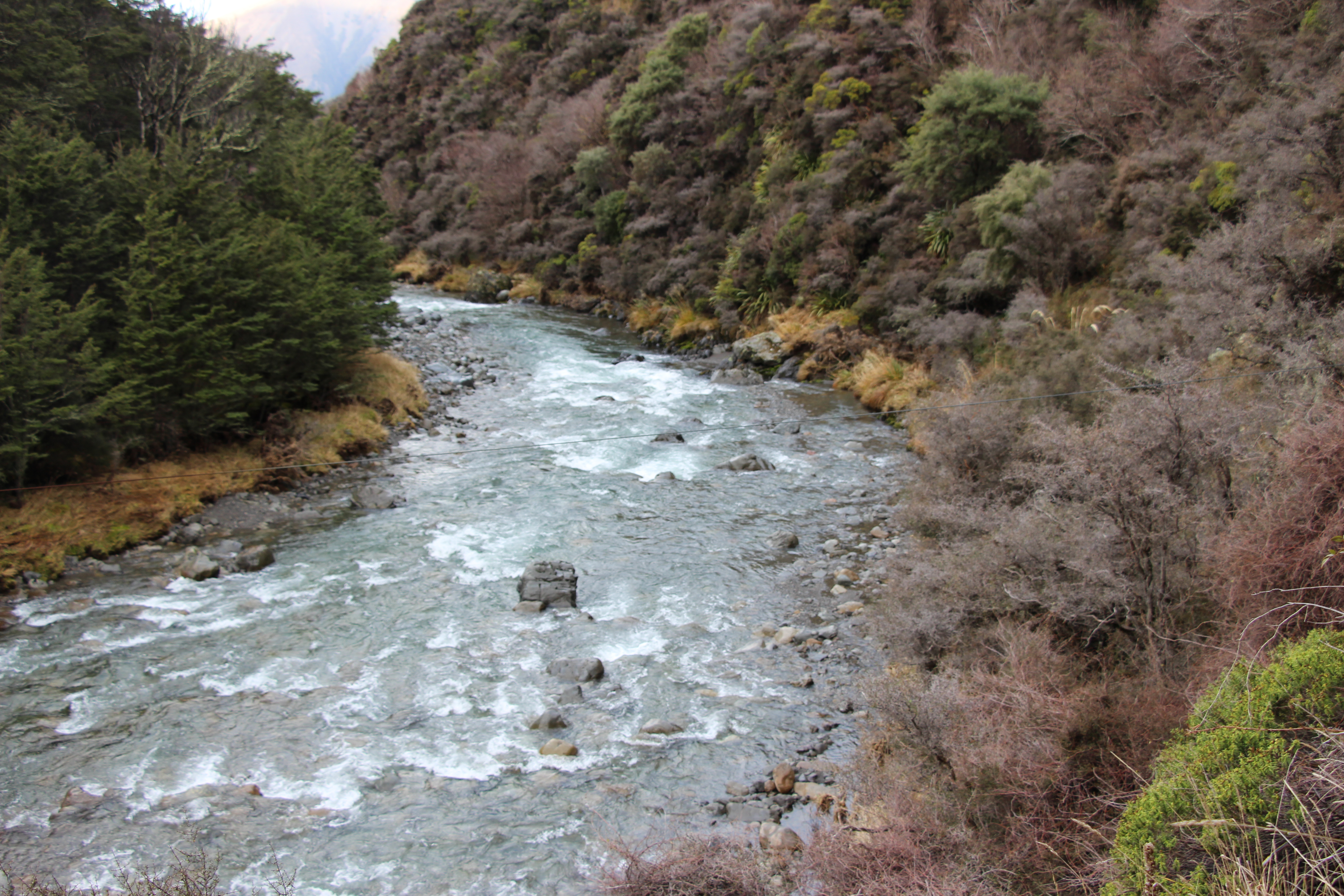
- Henry River

- Location of the mouth within New Zealand

Location
- Country: New Zealand

Physical characteristics
- Mouth
  - location: Waiau Uwha River

The Henry River is a minor river in the South Island of New Zealand.

The headwaters are in the Spenser Mountains. The Anne River is a tributary. The river flows east for 10 kilometres (6 mi) before flowing into the Waiau Uwha River.
