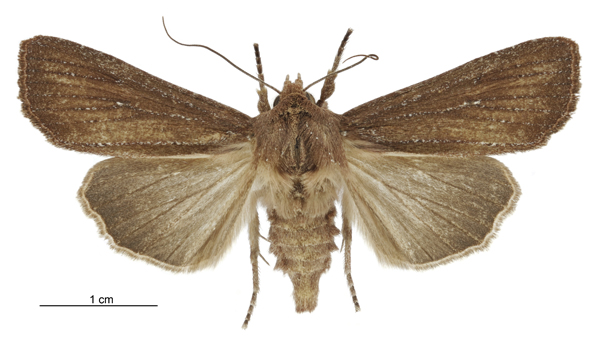
- Female
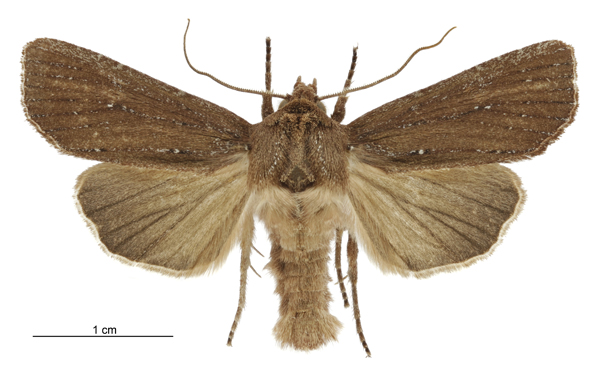
- Male

Scientific classification
- Kingdom: Animalia
- Phylum: Arthropoda
- Clade: Pancrustacea
- Class: Insecta
- Order: Lepidoptera
- Superfamily: Noctuoidea
- Family: Noctuidae
- Genus: Ichneutica
- Species: I. micrastra

Binomial name
- Ichneutica micrastra (Meyrick, 1897)

Synonyms
- Leucania micrastra Meyrick, 1897; Aletia micrastra (Meyrick, 1897); Physetica micrastra (Meyrick, 1897); Graphania micrasta (Meyrick, 1897); Tmetolophota micrastra (Meyrick, 1897)

= Ichneutica micrastra =

Species of moth

Ichneutica micrastra is a moth of the family Noctuidae. It is endemic to New Zealand. This species has been found only in the North Island and has been collected in the Northland, Auckland, Whanganui and Wellington regions. The preferred habitat of this species is wetlands and heathlands including gum fields in Northland. Adults of this species are on the wing from October to December. The life history of this species is unknown as are the host species of its larvae however it has been hypothesised that the likely larval host is a grass or grass like plant. This species is very similar in appearance to I. phaula and I. sapiens but can be distinguished as a result of differences in male antennae, the shape, colour and size of forewings, the range of the species as well as differences in genital shape.

== Taxonomy ==
This species was described by Edward Meyrick in 1897 from a specimen collected in Wellington and obtained from George Hudson. Meyrick originally named the species Leucania micrastra. The holotype specimen is held at the Natural History Museum, London. Some taxonomy databases have erroneously placed this species within the Graphania genus (now synonymised with Ichneutica) and misspelt the species name as Graphania micrasta. In 1988 J. S. Dugdale, in his catalogue of New Zealand Lepidoptera, placed this species within the Tmetolophota genus. In 2019 Robert Hoare undertook a major review of New Zealand Noctuidae species. During this review the genus Ichneutica was greatly expanded and the genus Tmetolophota was subsumed into that genus and is now regarded as a synonym. As a result of this review, this species is now known as Ichneutica micrastra.

== Description ==
Meyrick described the species as follows:

♂. 41 mm. Head and thorax reddish-brown, mixed with whitish-ochreous. Forewings rather light reddish-brown : veins irrorated with grey- whitish and fuscous; lower end of reniform indicated by a fuscous dot, preceded and followed by a minute whitish dot : cilia light brown-reddish. Hindwings fuscous, somewhat lighter towards base : cilia pale brownish, tips whitish.

The wingspan of the male of this species is between 36 and 43 mm and for the female is between 40 and 46 mm. This species is very similar in appearance to I. phaula and I. sapiens. The male I. micrastra can be distinguished from these two species as there is a difference in pectinations on its antennae. Both male and female I. micrastra are darker and chunkier than I. phaula. It appears there is also no overlap in range as I. phaula is found only in the South and Stewart Islands. Both the male and female I. micrastra lack the faint dark line on the forewing termen of I. sapiens specimens that connect the vein ends.

== Distribution ==
It is endemic to New Zealand. It is found only in the North Island and has been collected in the Northland, Auckland, Whanganui and Wellington regions.

== Habitat ==
This is a species known from wetland and heathland habitat. It has been collected in flax wetlands and northern gum fields.

== Behaviour ==
Adults of this species are on the wing from October to December.

== Life history and host species ==
The life history of this species is unknown as are the host species of its larvae. Hoare hypothesised that a grass or grass like plants are the likely larval host of this species based on the know preferred habitat and the shape of the female ovipositor, the latter possibly an adaption for placing eggs on such plants.
