= Ada River (New Zealand) =

Coordinates: 42°20′S 172°36′E

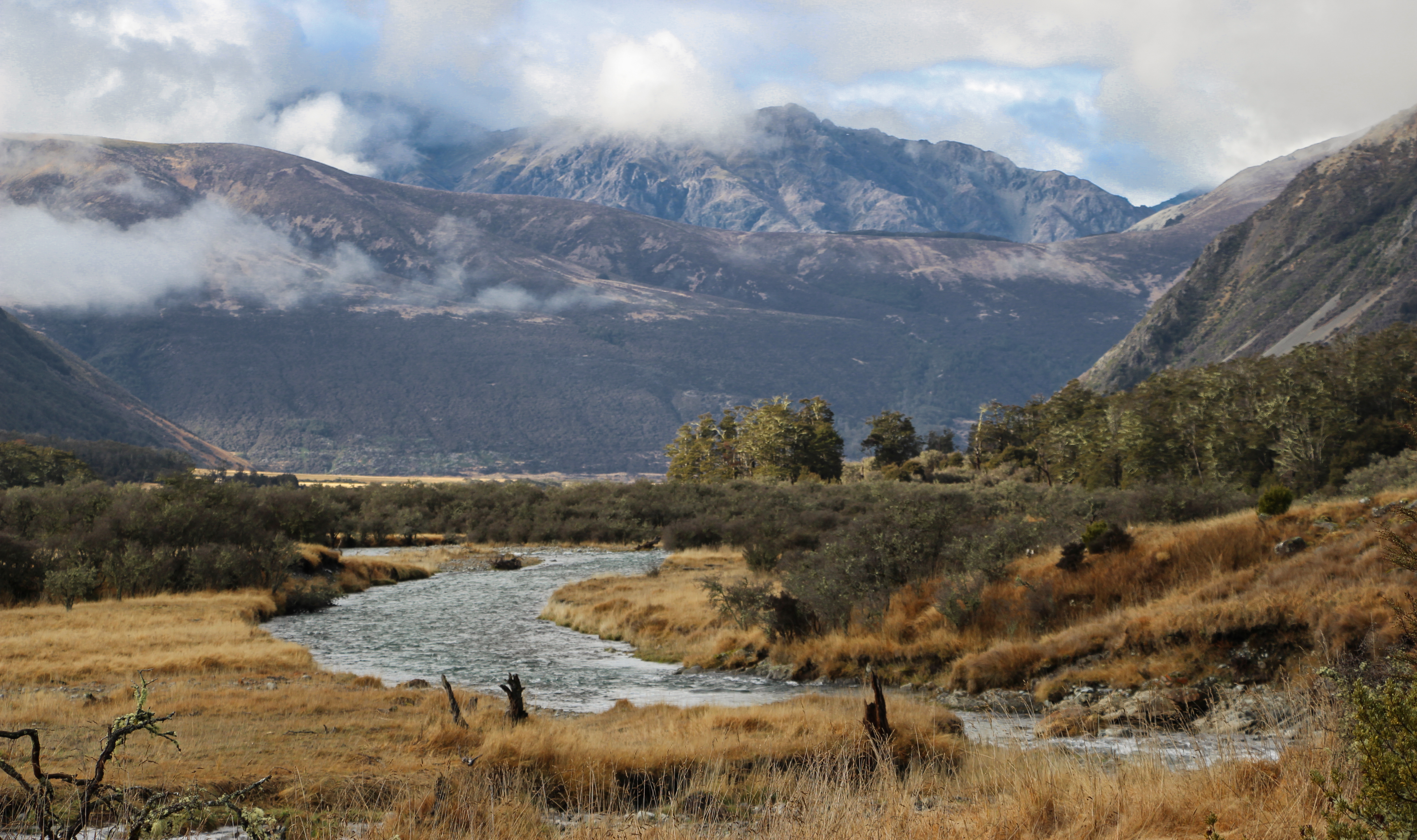
- Ada River

Location
- Country: New Zealand

Physical characteristics
- Mouth
  - location: Waiau Uwha River

The Ada River is a minor river in the Canterbury Region in the South Island of New Zealand.

The headwaters are in the Spenser Mountains. The river flows east for 10 kilometres (6 mi) before flowing into the Waiau Uwha River.
