= Lake Guyon =

Lake in New Zealand

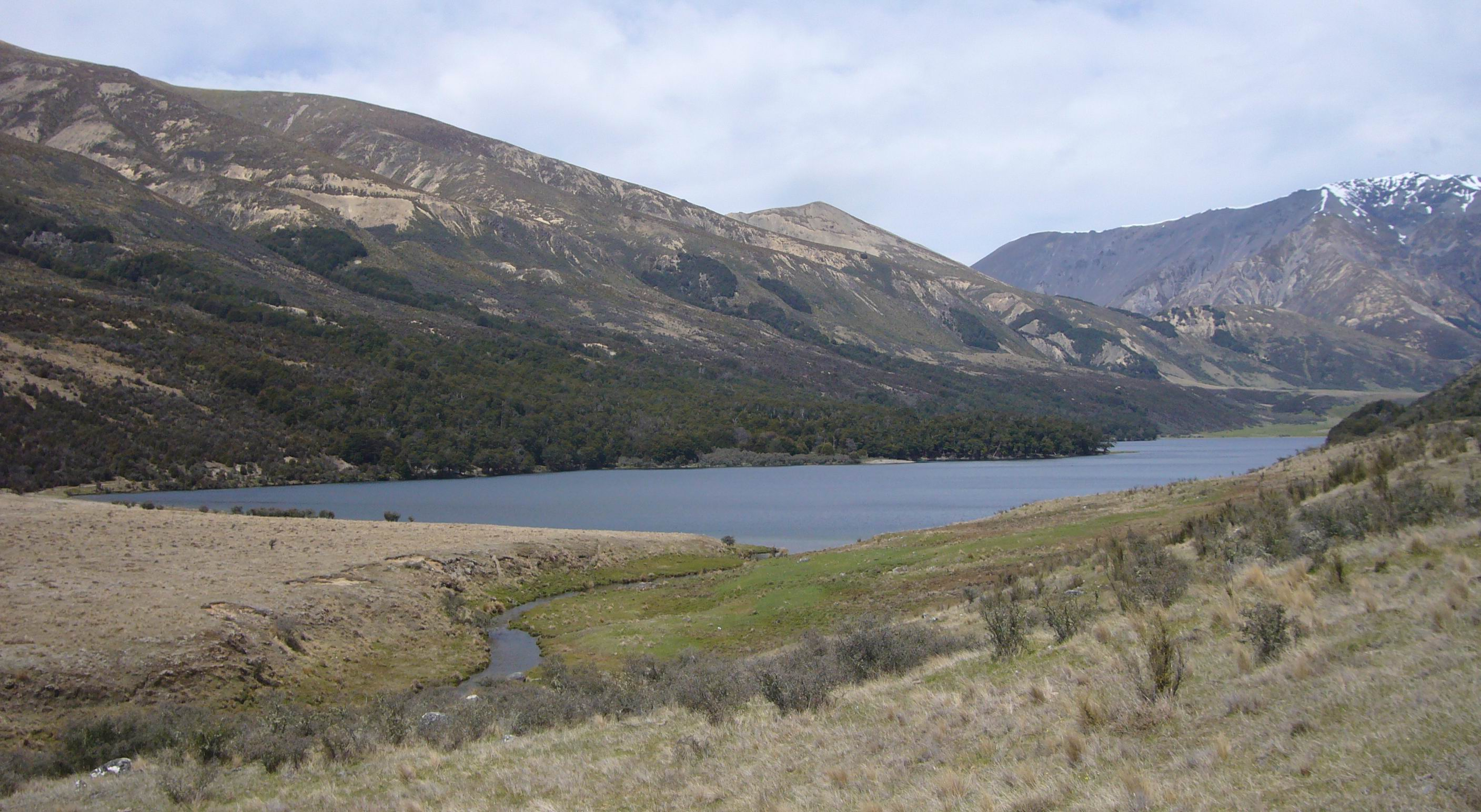
- Lake Guyon

- Location within South Island
- Location: Canterbury, New Zealand
- Coordinates: 42.289818°S 172.647657°E
- Basin countries: New Zealand
- Average depth: 24 m (79 ft)

Lake Guyon is in the Canterbury region in the South Island of New Zealand. The stream draining the lake feeds into the Waiau Uwha River.

It was within the boundaries of the former St James Station but it is now surrounded by public conservation land. A backcountry hut is on its northern shore. The lake is administered by the Department of Conservation as a scenic reserve.

== See also ==
- List of lakes in New Zealand
