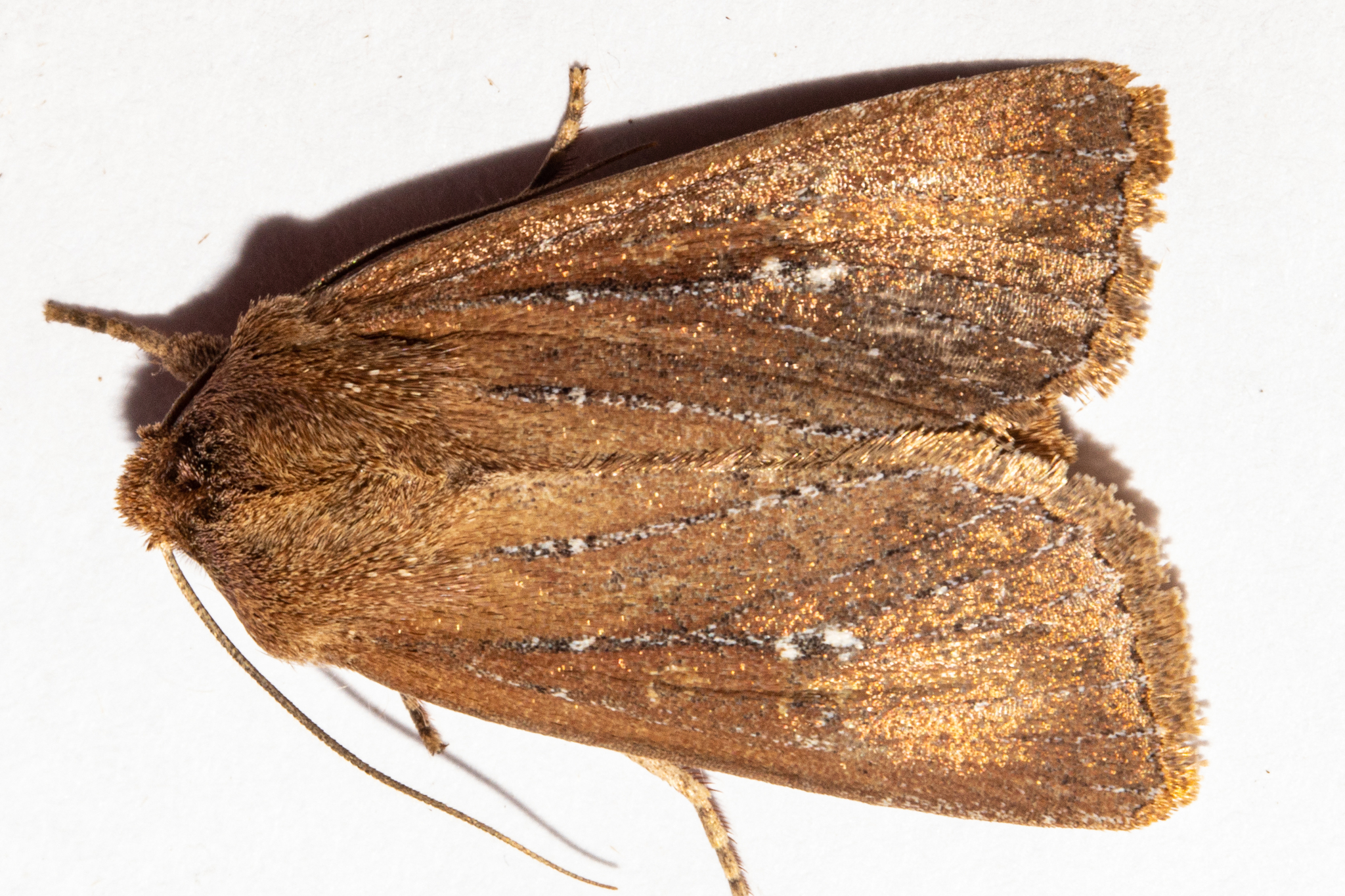

Scientific classification
- Kingdom: Animalia
- Phylum: Arthropoda
- Clade: Pancrustacea
- Class: Insecta
- Order: Lepidoptera
- Superfamily: Noctuoidea
- Family: Noctuidae
- Genus: Ichneutica
- Species: I. sapiens

Binomial name
- Ichneutica sapiens (Meyrick, 1929)

Synonyms
- Aletia sapiens Meyrick, 1929; Graphania sapiens (Meyrick, 1929)

= Ichneutica sapiens =

Species of moth

Ichneutica sapiens is a moth of the family Noctuidae. This species is endemic to New Zealand. I. sapiens is found in the central North Island, in the South Island in Westland and also the southern parts of the South Island, and in Stewart Island. This species inhabits wetland habitat but its life history is unknown as are the host species of its larvae. The adult moths are on the wing between December and early January and are attracted to sugar traps and to light. I. sapiens is very similar in appearance to I. micrastra but is a smaller moth with a shorter wingspan, has differently formed antennae and slightly different forewing markings.

== Taxonomy ==
This species was first described by Edward Meyrick in 1929 using a male specimen collected by George Hudson at Waiouru in December. Meyrick originally named the species Aletia sapiens. The holotype specimen is held at the Natural History Museum, London. In 1988, in his catalogue of New Zealand Lepidoptera, J. S. Dugdale synonymised this species with Tmetolophota micrastra, now known as Ichneutica micrastra. In 2019 Robert Hoare undertook a major review of New Zealand Noctuidae species. During this review the genus Ichneutica was greatly expanded and the genus Tmetolophota was subsumed into that genus and is now regarded as a synonym. As a result of this review, Hoare reinstated this species and it is now known as Ichneutica sapiens.

== Description ==
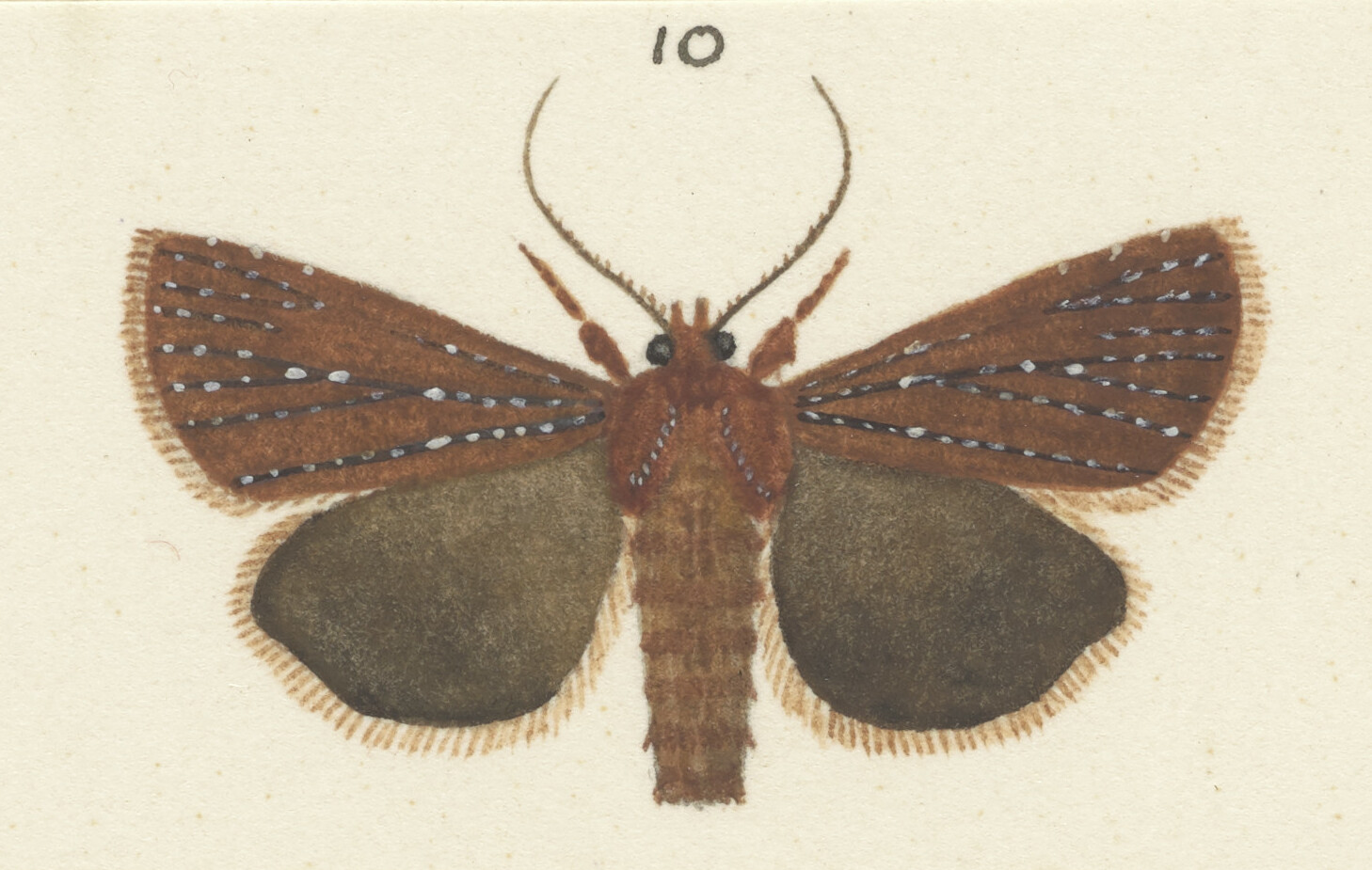
Illustration of male.

Meyrick described the species as follows:

♂. 37 mm. Head, palpi reddish-brown. Thorax reddish-brown, mixed whitish on dorsum, inner edge of tegulae sprinkled white. Antennae dentate, moderately fasciculate-ciliated. Forewings rather short-triangular, broader than in micrastra, termen rather obliquely rounded, crenulate; dull reddish-brown; veins (except towards costa) mixed dark fuscous and slightly sprinkled white; first and second lines indicated by obscure grey-whitish dots on veins; orbicular and claviform indicated by faint greyish suffusion; distinct white dots on each side of lower end of transverse vein; three or four indistinct whitish dots on costa posteriorly; terminal edge blackish, with minute white dots on veins: cilia light red-brownish, tips grey-whitish. Hindwings rather dark grey; cilia ochreous-whitish, suffused light ochreous towards base.

The male of this species has a wingspan of between 35 and 37 mm and the female has a wingspan of between 38 and 39 mm. I. sapiens is very similar in appearance to I. micrastra but can be distinguished as I. sapiens a smaller moth with a shorter wingspan. There are also differences in the male antennae and both male and female I. sapiens have a faint dark line on the forewing termen that connects the vein ends.

== Distribution ==
I. sapiens is endemic to New Zealand. It has been found in the North Island in the Tongariro National Park, in the South Island in Westland and the southern parts of the South Island, and in Stewart Island. The distribution of this species is unusual as the locations it has been found are quite separate. Hoare hypothesised that this may be because these populations are a remnant of a formerly more widely distributed group but also may result from this species being overlooked.

== Habitat ==
This species inhabits wetlands.

== Behaviour ==
The adults of this species are on the wing between December and early January and are attracted to sugar traps and to light.

== Life history and host species ==
The life history of this species is unknown as are the host species of its larvae. Hoare hypothesised that a grass or grass like plants are the likely larval host of this species based on the known preferred habitat and the shape of the female ovipositor, the latter possibly an adaption for placing eggs on such plants.
