= Spenser Mountains =

Mountain range in New Zealand

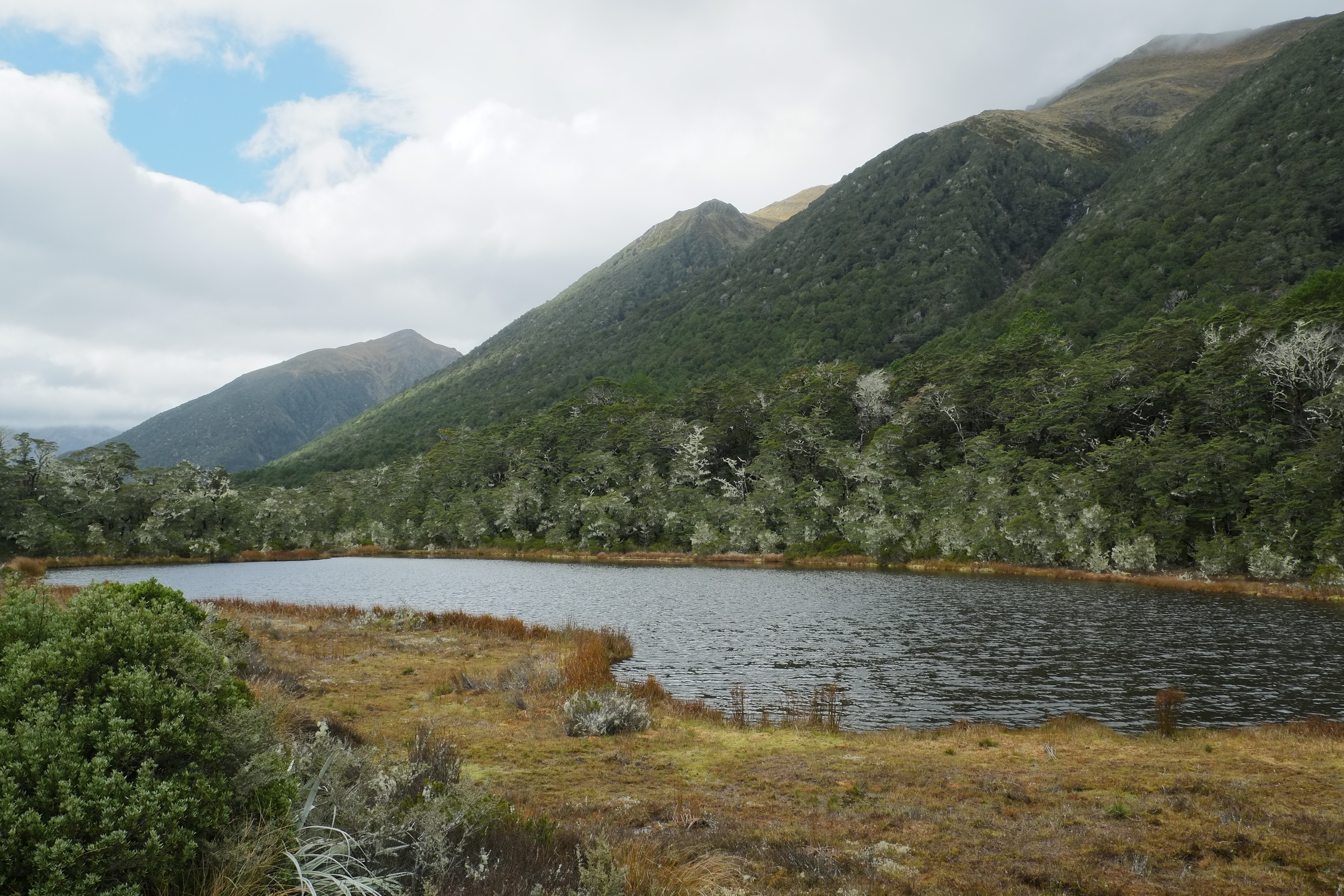
- Alpine tarn on the Lewis Pass in front of the Spenser Mountains

Highest point
- Peak: Mount Una
- Elevation: 2,300 m (7,500 ft)
- Coordinates: 42°15′S 172°30′E

Geography
- Location within New Zealand
- Country: New Zealand
- Region: Tasman

The Spenser Mountains is a topographic landform in the northern South Island of New Zealand. Located at the southern end of the Nelson Lakes National Park and north of the Lewis Pass they form a natural border between the Canterbury and Tasman regions. Several peaks are named after characters in Edmund Spenser’s allegorical poem, The Faerie Queene. Many of the early explorers were evidently literate men. For example, Frederick Weld (a surveyor) named Lake Tennyson; William Travers (a solicitor) named the Spensers and Faerie Queene; Julius Haast named Mt Una.

Within the range prominent peaks include Mount Una and Mount Humboldt. The Spenser Mountains are the northern limit of the glaciers within the Southern Alps.

Much of the forest cover is beech/podocarp with understory of a variety of ferns and shrubs; crown fern (Lomaria discolor) is one of the dominant understory ferns.

== Gallery ==
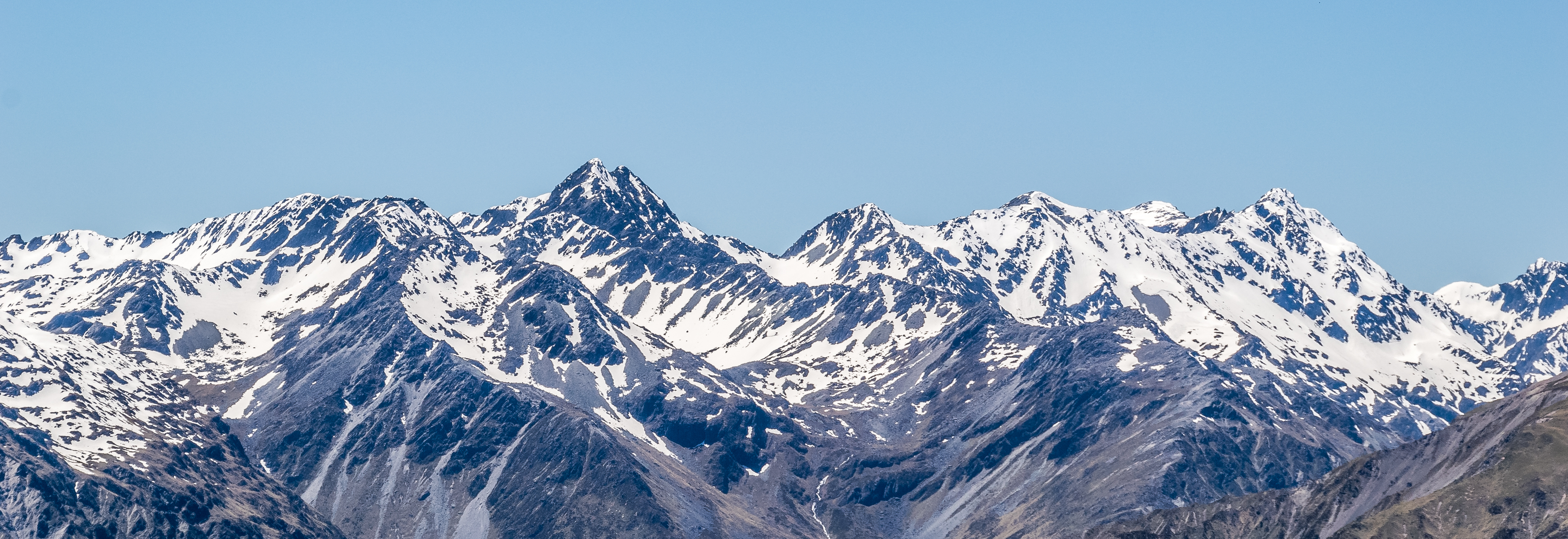
Spenser Mountains, Gloriana Peak left of centre, Faerie Queene to right

== See also ==
- Rimu
