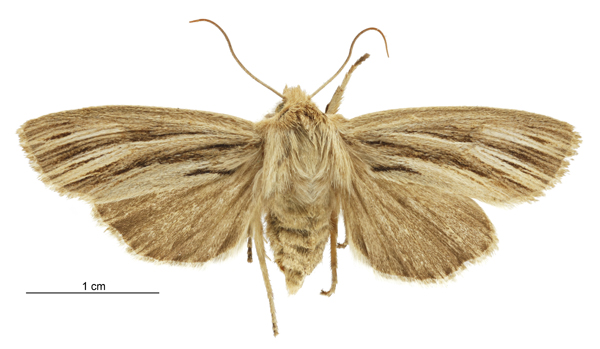
- Female

Scientific classification
- Kingdom: Animalia
- Phylum: Arthropoda
- Clade: Pancrustacea
- Class: Insecta
- Order: Lepidoptera
- Superfamily: Noctuoidea
- Family: Noctuidae
- Genus: Ichneutica
- Species: I. stulta

Binomial name
- Ichneutica stulta (Philpott, 1905)

Synonyms
- Leucania stulta Philpott, 1905; Tmetolophota stulta (Philpott, 1905)

= Ichneutica stulta =

Species of moth

Ichneutica stulta is a moth of the family Noctuidae. It is endemic to New Zealand. This species has only been collected from West Plains and Tuturau in Southland but, as at 2021, no male species appears to exist in collections. I. stulta can resemble I. acontistis but can be distinguished as I. stulta has a strongly curved forewing edge as well as having a discal spot on the underside of the hindwing. I. stulta is also darker than specimens of I. acontistis obtained in the southern parts of the South Island. I. stulta is also very similar in appearance to I. emmersonorum but the later species has darker forewings and is more strongly marked on the thorax. The life history of this species is unknown as are the host species of the larvae but the adults have been recorded as being on the wing from October to December.

It is possible that this species is extinct, likely as a result of habitat loss. It has been recommended that a comprehensive survey be undertaken in spring in the wetlands and shrublands surrounding Invercargill in order to attempt to rediscover this moth. In 2025 this species was classified as "data deficient" under the New Zealand Threat Classification System having the qualifier, "possibly extinct".

== Taxonomy ==
This species was first described by Alfred Philpott in 1905 and named Leucania stulta. Philpott states he used both female and male specimens to inform his description of this species and that he figured a male specimen sourced from Robert Gibb's collection. This specimen has since been lost and no male specimen appears to exist in collections. The lectotype female specimen collected at West Plains, Southland is held at the New Zealand Arthropod Collection. In 1988 J. S. Dugdale, in his catalogue of New Zealand Lepidoptera, placed this species within the genus Tmetolophota. In 2019 Robert Hoare undertook a major review of New Zealand Noctuidae. During this review the genus Ichneutica was greatly expanded and the genus Tmetolophota was subsumed into that genus as a synonym. As a result of this review, this species is now known as Ichneutica stulta.

== Description ==
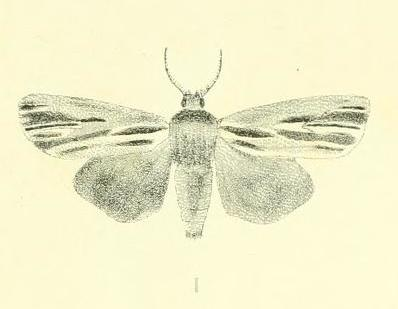
Illustration of I. stulta accompanying the first description

Philpott described the species as follows:

♂, ♀, 41 mm. Head, palpi, thorax, and abdomen pale-fawn; dark line on collar, suffusedly bordered with whitish. Antennae brown, basal portion whitish, shortly ciliated in male. Forewings slightly dilated; costa uniformly arched; apex round-pointed; termen slightly oblique, rounded; pale-fawn; markings dark reddish-brown; a short streak from near base beneath to 1/4; a suffused irregular streak from middle of base to termen above anal angle, almost interrupted before middle; a suffused streak from 1/3, attenuated anteriorly and much dilated towards termen, divided on lower portion by whitish borders of veins; one or two short apical streaks above this; cilia brownish on termen, fawn beneath. Hind wings fuscous; cilia whitish with dark line.

The adult female has a wingspan of between 33 and 41 mm. I. stulta can resemble I. acontistis but can be distinguished as I. stulta has a strongly curved forewing edge as well as having a discal spot on the underside of the hindwing. I. stulta is also darker than specimens of I. acontistis obtained in the southern parts of the South Island. Another species I. stulta is very similar in appearance to is I. emmersonorum but the later species has darker forewings and is more strongly marked on the thorax.

== Distribution ==
It is endemic to New Zealand. This species has only been collected from West Plains and Tuturau in Southland.

== Behaviour ==
Adults of this species are on the wing from October to December.

== Life history and hosts ==
The life history of this species is unknown as are the host species of the larvae.

== Conservation status ==
It is possible that this species is extinct. Although there has been intensive collecting around the Invercargill area in the 1980s this species has yet to be recorded again. This may be the result of habitat loss or changes in plant composition in this part of New Zealand, particularly the reduction in wetlands and shrublands. Hoare recommended a survey of the remaining shrubland and wetland habitats in spring to try to find this moth.

In 2025 this species was classified by the New Zealand Department of Conservation as "data deficient" under the New Zealand Threat Classification System having the qualifier, "possibly extinct".
