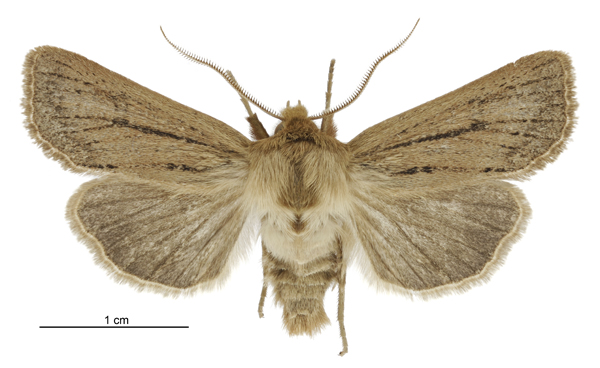
- Male
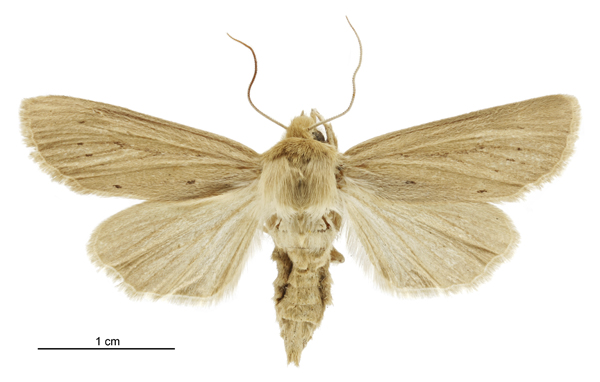
- Female

Scientific classification
- Kingdom: Animalia
- Phylum: Arthropoda
- Clade: Pancrustacea
- Class: Insecta
- Order: Lepidoptera
- Superfamily: Noctuoidea
- Family: Noctuidae
- Genus: Ichneutica
- Species: I. unica

Binomial name
- Ichneutica unica (Walker, 1856)

Synonyms
- Leucania unica Walker, 1856; Tmetolophota unical (Walker, 1856); Nonagria juncicolor Guenee, 1856; Graphania juncicolor (Guenee, 1856); Graphania unica (Walker, 1856)

= Ichneutica unica =

Species of moth

Ichneutica unica is a species of moth in the family Noctuidae. It is endemic to New Zealand and is found in the centre of the North Island and throughout the South Island. This moth is very similar in appearance to its close relatives Ichneutica phaula and Ichneutica toroneura. I. phaula can be distinguished as there is a difference in pectinations on the male antennae and I. toroneura can be distinguished as the black vein markings on the forewings is more uniform for that species in comparison to I. unica. I. unica is variable in appearance with the North Island specimens having a darker brown colour on the forewings and having a darker underside of the hindwings. This species inhabits open tussock grassland at various altitudes, coastal dunes, and inland volcanic dunes. Larvae feed on tussock grasses such as Chionochloa pallens and species in the genus Poa. Adult moths are on the wing from November to February and are attracted to both sugar and light traps.

== Taxonomy ==
This species was first described by Francis Walker in 1856 using specimens collected at Waikouaiti by Percy Earl. Walker originally named the species Leucania unica. The holotype specimen is held at the Natural History Museum, London. In 1868 Achille Guenée, thinking he was describing a new species, named the species Nonagria juncicolor. George Hudson discussed and illustrated this species under the name Leucania unica both in his 1898 book New Zealand moths and butterflies (Macro-lepidoptera), and his 1928 publication The Butterflies and Moths of New Zealand. In his 1898 publication Hudson synonymised the name given to the species by Guenée. In 1971 John S. Dugdale transferred all the New Zealand species in the genus Leucania to the genus Tmetolophota. In 2019 Robert Hoare undertook a major review of New Zealand Noctuidae species. During this review the genus Ichneutica was greatly expanded and the genus Tmetolophota was subsumed into that genus as a synonym. As a result of this review, this species is now known as Ichneutica unica.

== Description ==
Edward Meyrick described the species as follows:

Male, female. — 34-35 mm. Head, palpi, antennae, thorax, abdomen, and legs whitish-ochreous, slightly brownish-tinged; antennae in male moderately bipectinated, pectinations strongly ciliated. Forewings moderately dilated, costa almost straight, apex obtuse, hindmargin waved, somewhat oblique, rounded beneath; whitish-ochreous, slightly brownish-tinged, sometimes with a few scattered black scales; first Iine represented by three pairs of obscure black dots; a posterior curved series of black dots : cilia whitish-ochreous. Hindwings grey, more or less tinged with whitish-ochreous; cilia pale whitish-ochreous.

The wingspan of the male adult of this species is between 32 and 37 mm and the female is between 32 and 36 mm. I. unica is variable in appearance with the North Island specimens having a darker brown colour on the forewings and having a darker underside of the hindwings. This species is very similar in appearance to I. phaula but does not have the dentate antennae on the male of that species. It is also similar in appearance to I. toroneura but can be distinguished as the black vein markings are more patchy on the I. unica forewings.

== Distribution ==
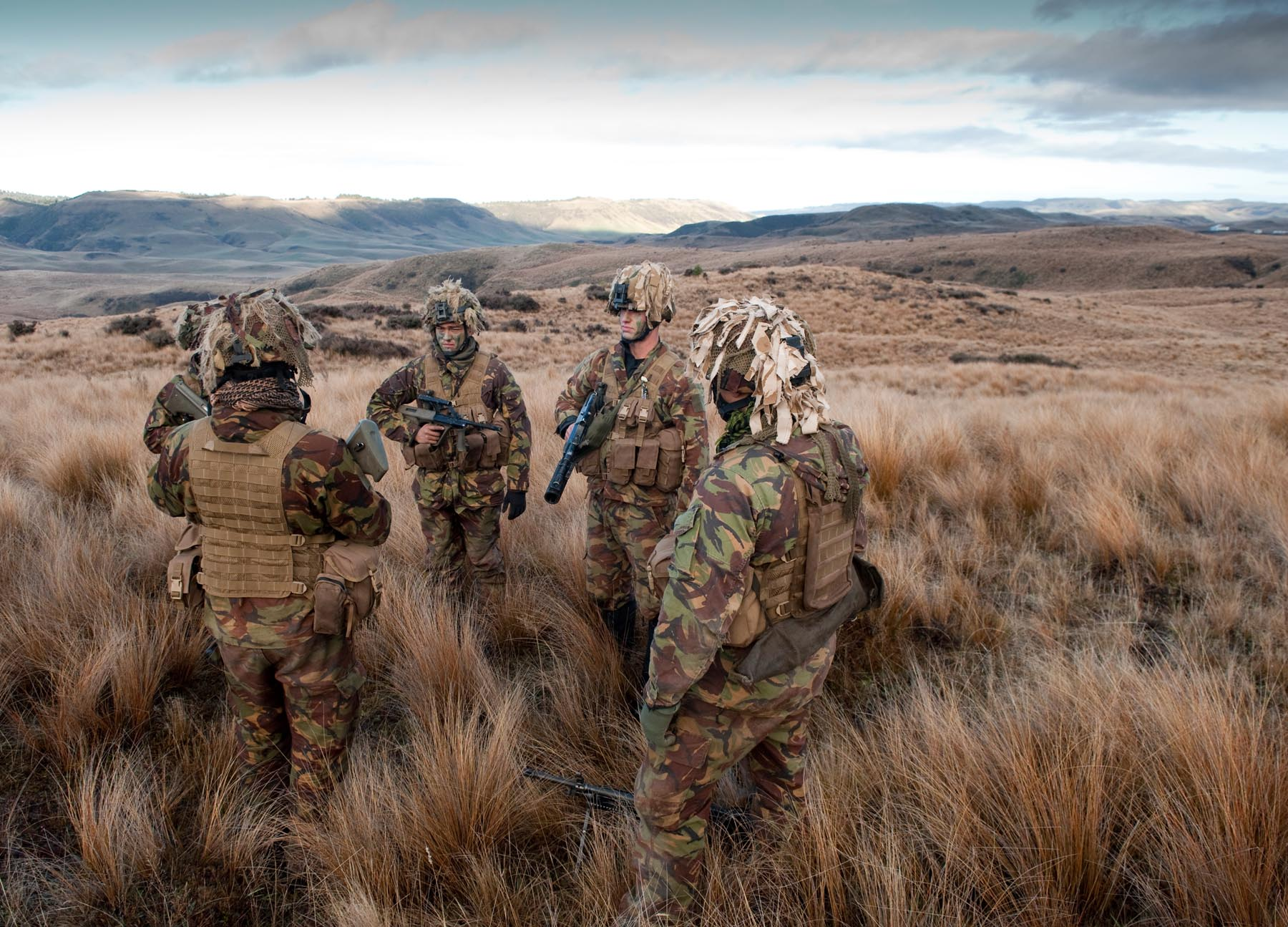
Tussock habitat of T. unica at Waiouru

This species is endemic to New Zealand. It is found in the centre of the North Island and throughout the South Island. The species has been collected in the North Island at Waiouru and Ohakune and in the South Island at Blenheim, Raikaia, Quail Island, Dunedin, Lake Wakatipu, Alexandra and Macetown.

== Habitat ==
This species prefers a variety of habitats including open tussock grassland at various altitude, coastal dunes, and inland volcanic dunes.

== Behaviour ==
The species is on the wing from November to February. It has been collected through sugar trapping. This species is also attracted to light and specimens have been collected through light trapping. It has been shown that artificial warming increases the body size of this moth.

== Life history and host species ==
Some part of this species life history is unknown but larvae are herbivorous and feed on the leaves of grasses including Chionochloa pallens as well as species within the genus Poa.
