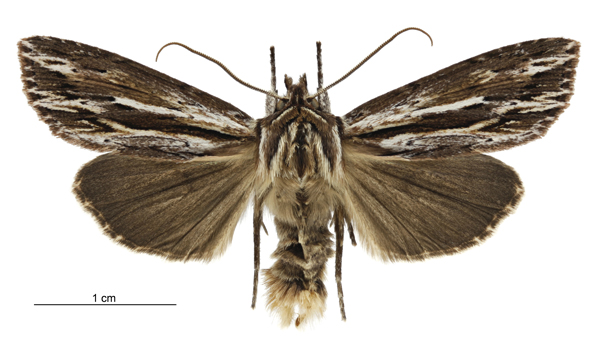
- Male
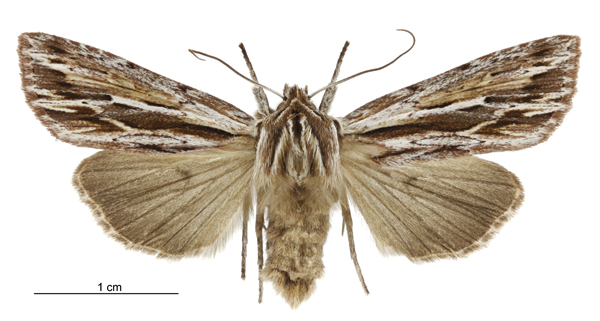
- Female

Scientific classification
- Kingdom: Animalia
- Phylum: Arthropoda
- Clade: Pancrustacea
- Class: Insecta
- Order: Lepidoptera
- Superfamily: Noctuoidea
- Family: Noctuidae
- Genus: Ichneutica
- Species: I. similis

Binomial name
- Ichneutica similis (Philpott, 1924)

Synonyms
- Persectania similis Philpott, 1924; Tmetolophota similis (Philpott, 1924); Graphania similis (Philpott, 1924)

= Ichneutica similis =

Species of moth

Ichneutica similis is a moth of the family Noctuidae. It is endemic to New Zealand. This species is found only in certain parts of the North Island, in the western side of the South Island and on Stewart Island. It inhabits peatlands as well as inland and coastal wetlands. The life history of this species is unknown and the host species of its larvae has yet to be confirmed. It has been hypothesised that larval host species might be within the Empodisma genus as well as possibly the species Apodasmia similis.

== Taxonomy ==
This species was first described by Alfred Philpott in 1924 from specimens collected in the Gouland Downs near the Heaphy Track. The male holotype specimen is held in the New Zealand Arthropod Collection. Philpott originally named the species Persectania similis. J. S. Dugdale discussed this species in his 1988 catalogue and placed it within the Tmetolophota genus. In 2019 Robert Hoare undertook a major review of New Zealand Noctuidae. During this review the genus Ichneutica was greatly expanded and the genus Tmetolophota was subsumed into that genus as a synonym. As a result of this review, this species is now known as Ichneutica similis.

== Description ==
Philpott described the adults of the species as follows:

♂ ♀. 38-40 mm. Head and palpi reddish-brown sprinkled with white. Antennae reddish-brown, basally white, in male with short cilla. Thorax with slight blunt anterior crest, greyish-white; a white frontal bar, margined beneath with blackish-brown and above with reddish-brown; patagia margined with reddish-brown. Abdomen in ♂ brown, in ♀ grey. Legs reddish-brown, tarsi mixed with white. Forewings narrow, costa almost straight, apex blunt-pointed, termen rounded, obhque; bright reddish-brown irroraled with whitish; basal area above middle for about 1/4 in ♂ clearer white, in ♀ less marked and extending farther along costa; a fine blackish median streak from base to 1/3, margined beneath with dark reddish-brown; a broad streak along dorsum suffused with whitish; first line strongly dentate, white, prosteriorly brown-margined, hardly traceable on upper half; an indistinct blackish line in disc above middle; second line hardly distinguishable, blackish-margined, strongly dentate, apex of teeth marked by black dots; subterminal very strongly and irregularly dentate, dentations filled with whitish, anteriorly interruptedly blackish-margined; stigmata almost obsolete, in female orbicular and reniform represented by obscure pinkish blotches : cilla reddish-brown, tips more or less whitish. Hindwings dark fuscous, in male reddish-tinged : cilia in ♂ grey, in ♀ basal half white, with interrupted dark basal line. Undersides fuscous-grey, pink-tinged, in ♀ paler.

The wingspan of the male adult of this species is between 35 and 37 mm and for the adult female of between 36 and 38 mm. I. similis might possibly be confused with I. emmersonorum however I. emmersonorum has wider and darker coloured forewing with a less distinct kidney mark.

== Distribution ==
It is endemic to New Zealand. This species is found only in certain parts of the North Island, in the western side of the South Island and on Stewart Island.

== Habitat ==
The species inhabits peatlands as well as inland and coastal wetlands. Although it has yet to be collected in Northland gumland locations, it is possible it also inhabits these gumlands as moth species with similar preferences in habitat are also found in these locations.

== Behaviour ==
The adults of this species are on the wing from January to March.

== Life history and host species ==
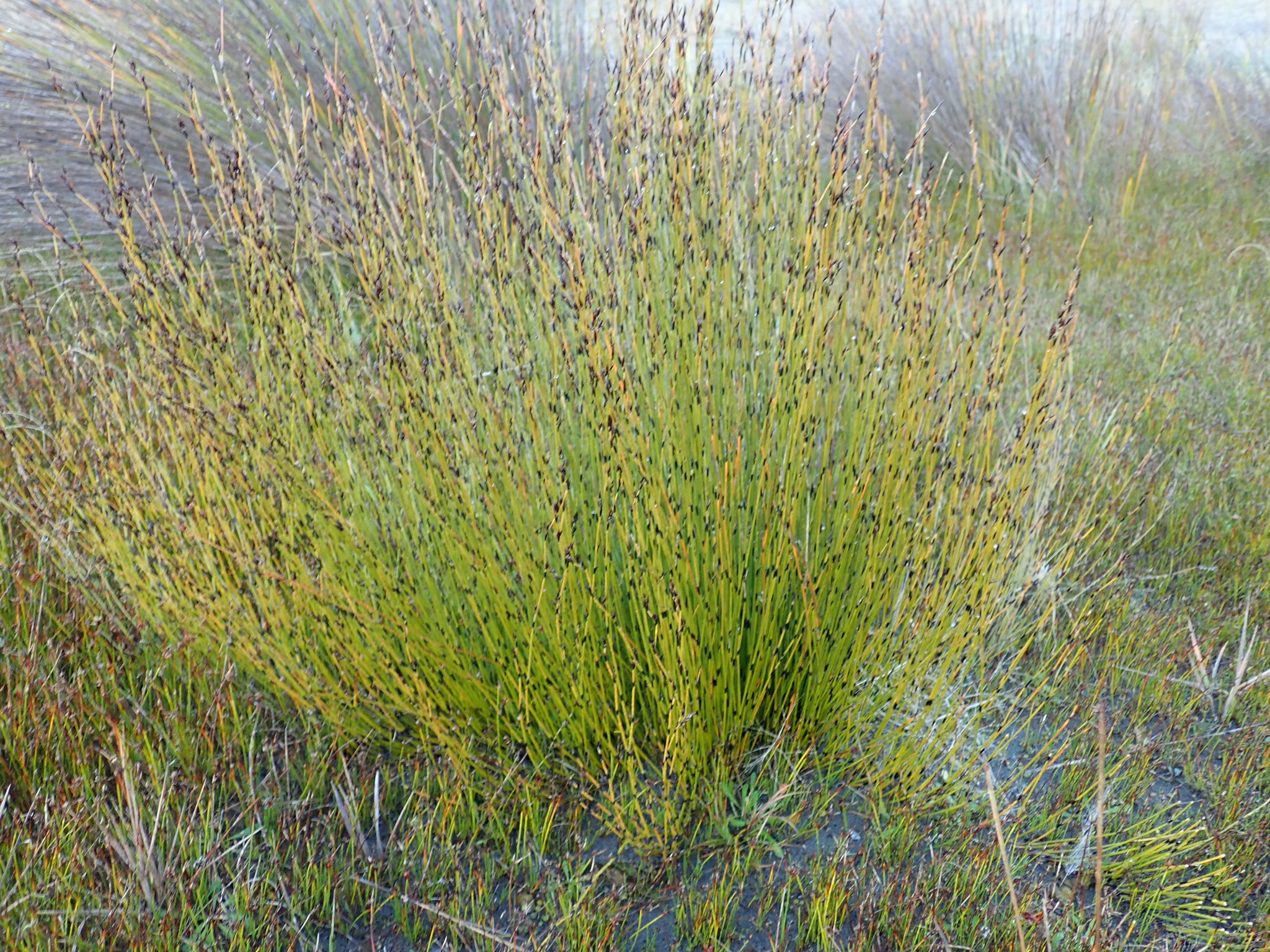
Apodasmia similis, a possible larval host of I. similis

The life history of this species is unknown and the host species of its larvae has yet to be confirmed. It has been hypothesised that larval host species might be within the Empodisma genus as well as possibly Apodasmia similis.
