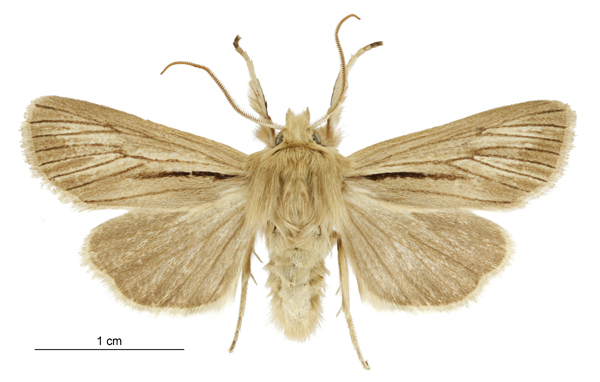
- Male
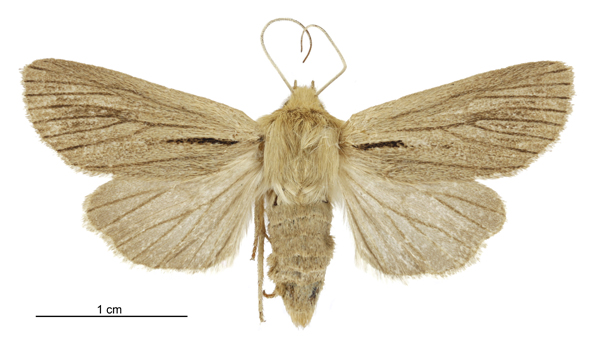
- Female

Scientific classification
- Kingdom: Animalia
- Phylum: Arthropoda
- Clade: Pancrustacea
- Class: Insecta
- Order: Lepidoptera
- Superfamily: Noctuoidea
- Family: Noctuidae
- Genus: Ichneutica
- Species: I. acontistis

Binomial name
- Ichneutica acontistis (Meyrick, 1887)

Synonyms
- Leucania acontistis Meyrick, 1887; Graphania acontistis (Meyrick, 1887); Tmetolophota acontistis (Meyrick, 1887)

= Ichneutica acontistis =

Species of moth

Ichneutica acontistis is a moth of the family Noctuidae. It is endemic to New Zealand and is found only in the South Island, mainly on the eastern side although not in the Nelson district. This species is similar in appearance to I. paraxysta, I. stulta and I. toroneura. I. acontistis is unlikely to be confused with I. paraxysta as the later is only found in the North Island. I. acontistis can be distinguished from I. stulta as the latter species has a strongly curved forewing edge where as I. acontistis' is straight. I. acontistis can be distinguished from I. toroneura as the former has a dark stroke of colour starting from the base of the forewing that I. toroneura lacks. I. acontistis inhabits tussock grasslands and the larvae of this species feed on species of grass found in the genera Poa, Elymus and Rytidosperma. It pupates under rocks and adults are on the wing from September to January. I. acontistis are attracted to light.

== Taxonomy ==
This species was described by Edward Meyrick in 1887 from a male specimen collected at Castle Hill by John Davies Enys and named Leucania acontistis. The holotype specimen is held at the Canterbury Museum. In 1988, in his catalogue of New Zealand Lepidoptera, J. S. Dugdale placed this species within the Tmetolophota genus. In 2019 Robert Hoare undertook a major review of New Zealand Noctuidae. During this review the genus Ichneutica was greatly expanded and the genus Tmetolophota was subsumed into that genus as a synonym. As a result of this review, this species is now known as Ichneutica acontistis.

== Description ==
The larvae of this species have yet to be described.

Meyrick described the adult of the species as follows:

Male. — 86 mm. Head, palpi, antennae, thorax, abdomen, and legs whitish-ochreous, slightly brownish tinged; antennae with strong triangular transverse dentations, terminating in tufts of cilia; collar with an imperfect blackish transverse line. Forewings moderately dilated, costa hardly arched, apex obtuse, hindmargin rather oblique, rounded beneath; whitish-ochreous, brownish-tinged; a slender attenuated black streak below middle from base to 2/5 : cilia ochreous-whitish. Hindwings light grey, tinged with whitish-ochreous; cilia ochreous-whitish.

The wingspan of the adult male of this species is between 31 and 39.5 mm and for the female is between 32 and 38.5 mm.

Although I. acontistis is similar in appearance to I. paraxysta confusion is unlikely to happen as I. acontistis is found only in the South Island and I. paraxysta is found only in the North Island. Other species that are also similar in appearance to this species are I. stulta and I. toroneura. I. acontistis can be distinguished from I. stulta as I. acontistis has an almost straight leading edge of the forewing where as in specimens of I. stulta this forewing edge is strongly curved. I. acontistis also lacks the discal spot found on the underside of the hindwing which is present in specimens of I. stulta. I. acontistis can be distinguished from I. toroneura as I. acontistis have the dark stroke of colour starting from the base of the forewing that I. toroneura lacks.

== Distribution ==
Ichneutica acontistis is endemic to New Zealand. This species only found in the South Island and tends to be present on the eastern side of that island. However it has yet to be collected and may be absent from the Nelson district.

== Habitat ==
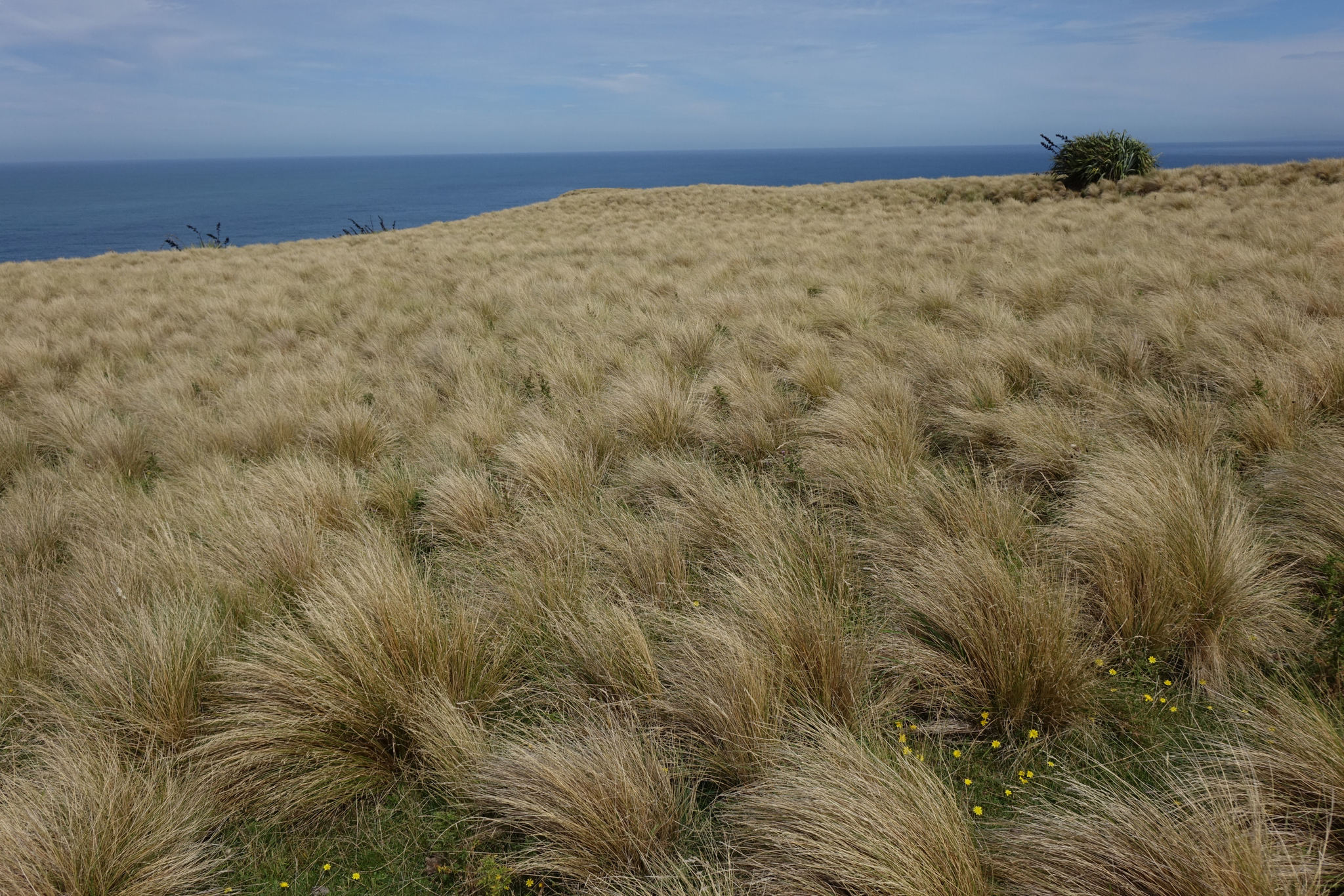
Tussock grassland habitat of I. acontistis

Ichneutica acontistis inhabits tussock grasslands.

== Behaviour ==
Adults are on the wing from September to January. They are attracted to light. Adults have been collected via a mercury vapour light trap.

== Life cycle and host species ==
Larvae feed on tussock grassland species within the genera Poa, Elymus and Rytidosperma. Adult moths have been reared from pupae that were found under rocks. This species doesn't appear to have suffered the sharp decreased in population occurring to species that inhabited similar habitat to species during the early 1960s to the late 1980s.
