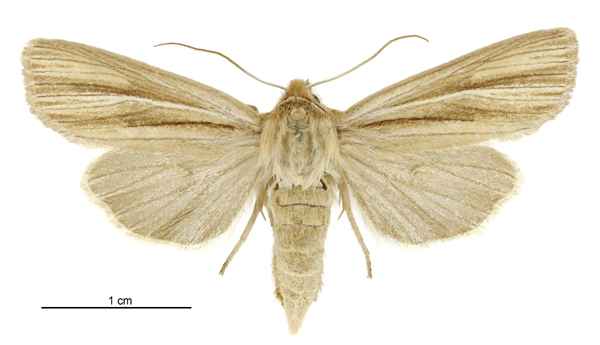
- Female
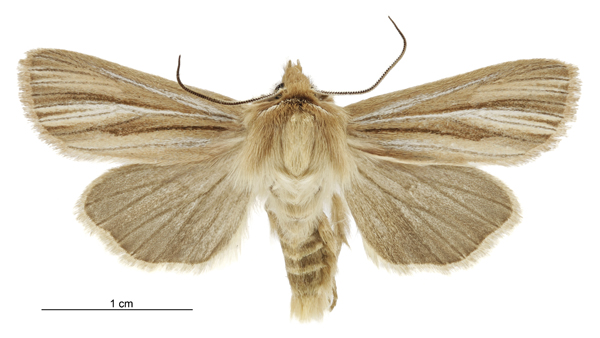
- Male

Scientific classification
- Kingdom: Animalia
- Phylum: Arthropoda
- Clade: Pancrustacea
- Class: Insecta
- Order: Lepidoptera
- Superfamily: Noctuoidea
- Family: Noctuidae
- Genus: Ichneutica
- Species: I. paraxysta

Binomial name
- Ichneutica paraxysta (Meyrick, 1929)

Synonyms
- Leucania paraxysta Meyrick, 1929; Tmetolophota paraxysta (Meyrick, 1929)

= Ichneutica paraxysta =

Species of moth

Ichneutica paraxysta is a moth of the family Noctuidae. It is endemic to New Zealand. This species is very similar in appearance to its close relative I. acontistis but as the range of the two species do not overlap this is unlikely to cause confusion. I. paraxysta is only found in the North Island at the subalpine zones in the Mount Taranaki region and at Mount Ruapehu. It prefers tussock grassland and shrubland habitat. The life history of this species is unknown as are the host species of its larvae however it has been hypothesised that the larval host plants are species in the genera of Poa and Festuca.

== Taxonomy ==
This species was first described by Edward Meyrick in 1929 from specimens collected around Waiouru by George Hudson and named Leucania paraxysta. The lectotype specimen is held at the Natural History Museum, London. In 1971 John S. Dugdale transferred all the New Zealand species in the genus Leucania to the genus Tmetolophota. In 1988 J. S. Dugdale, in his catalogue of New Zealand Lepidoptera, confirmed this placement. In 2019 Robert Hoare undertook a major review of New Zealand Noctuidae species. During this review the genus Ichneutica was greatly expanded and the genus Tmetolophota was subsumed into that genus as a synonym. As a result of this review, this species is now known as Ichneutica paraxysta.

== Description ==
Meyrick described this species as follows:

♂ ♀. 36–37 mm. Head, palpi brown. Antennae ♂ dentate, moderately fasciculate-ciliated. Thorax whitish-ochreous, suffused brown anteriorly, with a bent anterior white bar edged dark fuscous in front. Forewings elongate-triangular, termen obliquely rounded; pale ochreous; veins finely brownish, posteriorly more or less sprinkled dark fuscous or blackish; slender whitish streaks along upper and lower margins of cell; a fine brownish streak above lower of these from before middle of wing expanded to fill space between veins 4 and 5 to termen; in ♂ wedge-shaped brownish spots resting on termen between veins 5–8, in ♂ more faintly indicated; a narrow brownish streak between veins 3 and 4 from near origin to termen, some whitish suffusion before base of this; a narrow reddish-brown streak somewhat sprinkled dark fuscous along fold from base to middle, continued by broader but lighter brownish suffusion above fold to termen; no black dots; cilia pale ochreous, ♀ tinged brownish. Hindwings rather dark grey; cilia ochreous-grey-whitish.

The wingspan of the adult male of the species is between 34 and 38 mm and for the female is between 34 and 38 mm. I. paraxysta is a pale, medium-sized moth. Its hindwings are slightly darker than its forewings, and veins on the latter are clearly defined. This species is very similar in appearance to I. acontistis, however this is unlikely to be confusion between these species as I. acontistis is only found in the South Island.

== Distribution ==
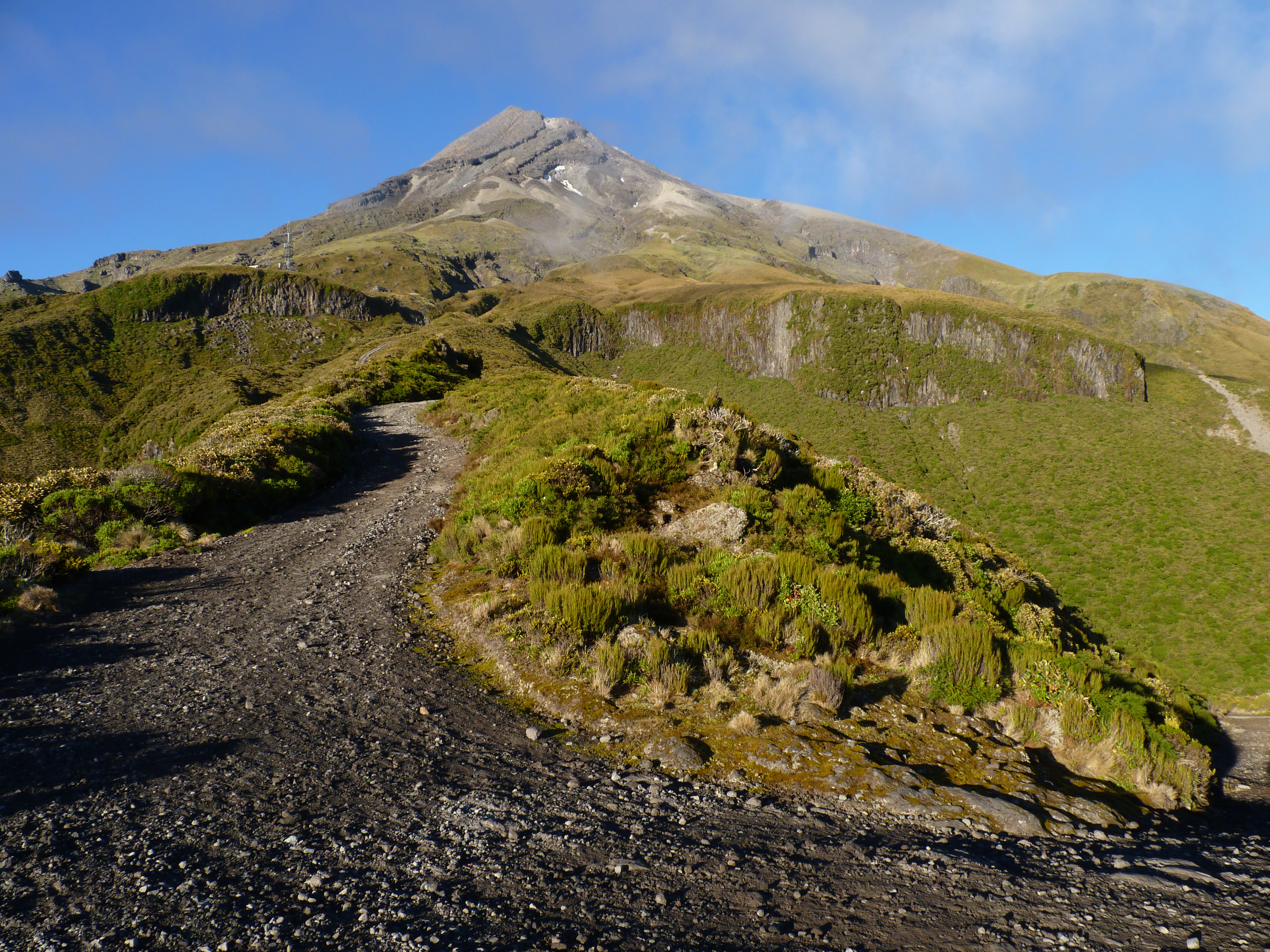
Mount Taranaki, habitat of I. paraxysta

I. paraxysta is endemic to New Zealand. It is found in the North Island only, in the Mount Taranaki region and at Mount Ruapehu.

== Habitat ==
This species is found at subalpine altitudes in native tussock grasslands and shrubland.

== Behaviour ==
Adults of this species is on the wing from November to January.

== Life history and host species ==
The life history of this species is unknown as are the host species of its larvae. Hoare hypothesised that as a result of its similarity to I. acontistis the larval host species are likely to be species in the genera Poa and Festuca.
