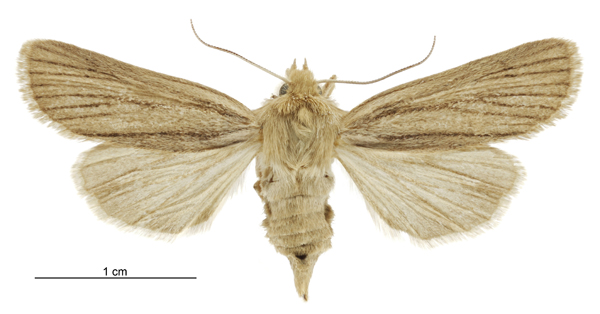
- Female
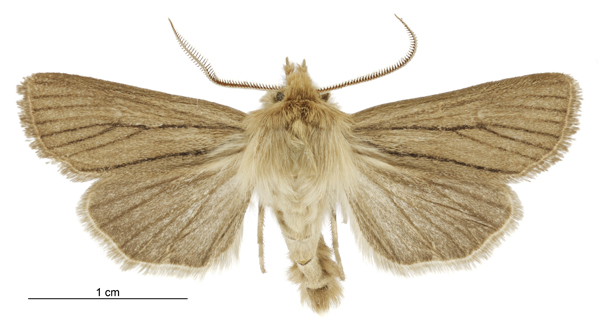
- Male

Scientific classification
- Kingdom: Animalia
- Phylum: Arthropoda
- Clade: Pancrustacea
- Class: Insecta
- Order: Lepidoptera
- Superfamily: Noctuoidea
- Family: Noctuidae
- Genus: Ichneutica
- Species: I. toroneura

Binomial name
- Ichneutica toroneura (Meyrick, 1901)

Synonyms
- Leucania toroneura Meyrick, 1901; Graphania toroneura (Meyrick, 1901); Tmetolophota toroneura (Meyrick, 1901)

= Ichneutica toroneura =

Species of moth

Ichneutica toroneura is a moth of the family Noctuidae. It is endemic to New Zealand. This species is similar to I. unica but can be distinguished from that species by the uniform black vein markings on the forewings of I. toroneura. It is also similar in appearance to I. acontistis but the base of the forewings of I. toroneura lack the dark stripe that can be found on the forewings of I. acontistis. The males of I. toroneura have longer pectinations on their antennae. I. toroneura is found in the centre of southern South Island in the tussock grasslands of Central Otago and the Mackenzie Basin. Larvae feed on tussock grasses Poa cita and Festuca novae-zelandiae. Adults are on the wing from November to January.

== Taxonomy ==
This species was first described by Edward Meyrick in 1901 from specimens collected on Mount Cook at 2500 ft by G. V. Hudson. The lectotype specimen is held at the Natural History Museum, London. In 1988 J. S. Dugdale placed this species within the Tmetolophota genus. In 2019 Robert Hoare undertook a major review of New Zealand Noctuidae species. During this review the genus Ichneutica was greatly expanded and the genus Tmetolophota was subsumed into that genus as a synonym. As a result of this review, this species is now known as Ichneutica toroneura.

== Description ==
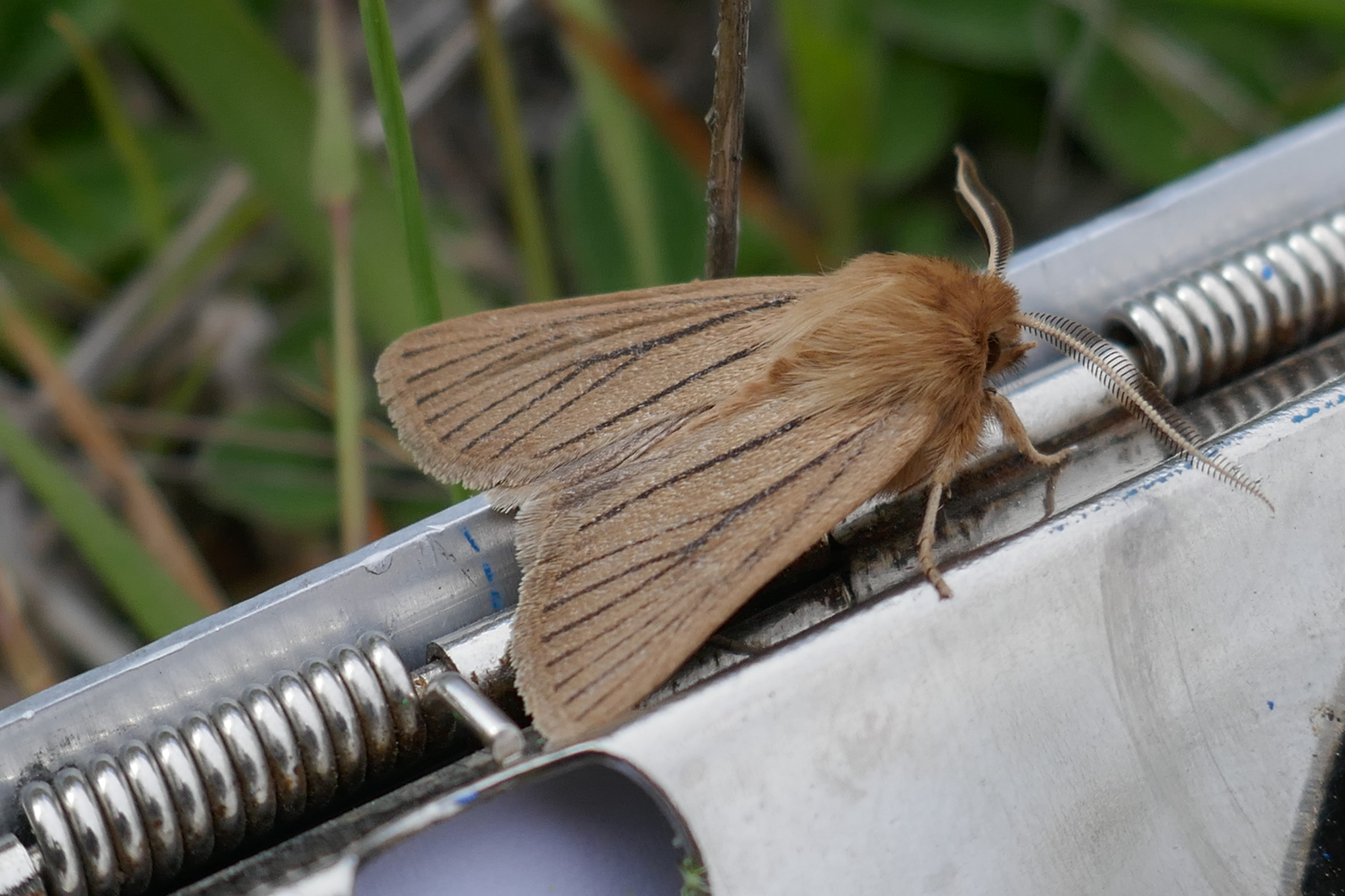
Live specimen of Ichneutica toroneura

Meyrick described the species as follows:

♂. 30-32 m.m. Head, palpi, thorax, and abdomen light brownish-ochreous, somewhat golden-tinged, terminal joint of palpi moderate. Antennas moderately bipectinated to near apex. Legs pale ochreous. Forewings with costa almost straight, apex obtuse, termen rather obliquely rounded; light brownish-ochreous; veins marked with more or less distinct slender blackish streaks, especially median and subdorsal : cilia pale brownish-ochreous. Hindwings fuscous; cilia whitish-ochreous.

The adult male wingspan is between 29–36 mm and for the adult female the wingspan is between 29–33 mm. This species is similar in appearance to I. unica but can be distinguished by the uniform black vein markings, where as the markings are more patchy on the I. unica forewings. I. toroneura is also similar to I. acontistis but I. toroneura lacks the dark stripe from the base of the forewing that can be found on specimens of I. acontistis and the males of I. toroneura have longer pectinations on their antennae.

== Distribution ==
This species is endemic to New Zealand and is found in the central parts of southern South Island.

== Habitat ==
This species inhabits the dry inland tussock grasslands of Central Otago and the Mackenzie Basin.

== Behaviour ==
Adults of this species are on the wing from November to January.

== Life history and host species ==
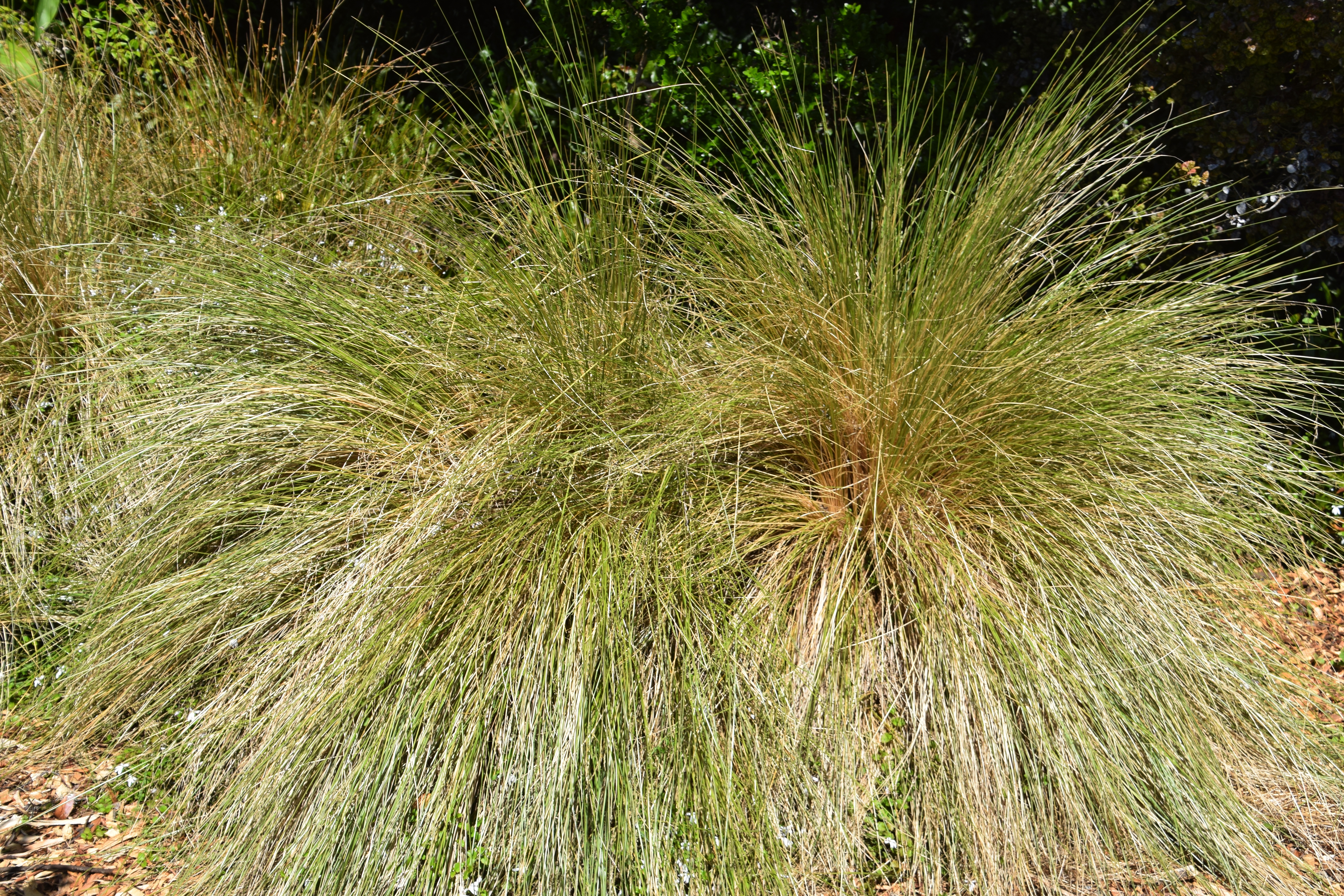
Poa cita, a host species of I. toroneura

Larvae of this species have been recorded as feeding on tussock grasses Poa cita and Festuca novae-zelandiae. The adults of this species are known to pollinate Dracophyllum acerosum.
