= Ichneutica emmersonorum =

Scientific classification
- Kingdom: Animalia
- Phylum: Arthropoda
- Clade: Pancrustacea
- Class: Insecta
- Order: Lepidoptera
- Superfamily: Noctuoidea
- Family: Noctuidae
- Genus: Ichneutica
- Species: I. emmersonorum

Binomial name
- Ichneutica emmersonorum Hoare, 2019

Species of moth

Ichneutica emmersonorum is a moth of the family Noctuidae. This species is endemic to New Zealand. It is very similar to I. similis but its forewings have visual differences. I. emmersonorum is only known from the North Island volcanic plateau. The life history of this species is unknown as are the host species of its larvae; however, Robert Hoare argues that the likely larval host plant species is a grass or grass-like plant. The adult moths are on the wing from November to January. This species is attracted to sugar traps and to light.

== Taxonomy ==
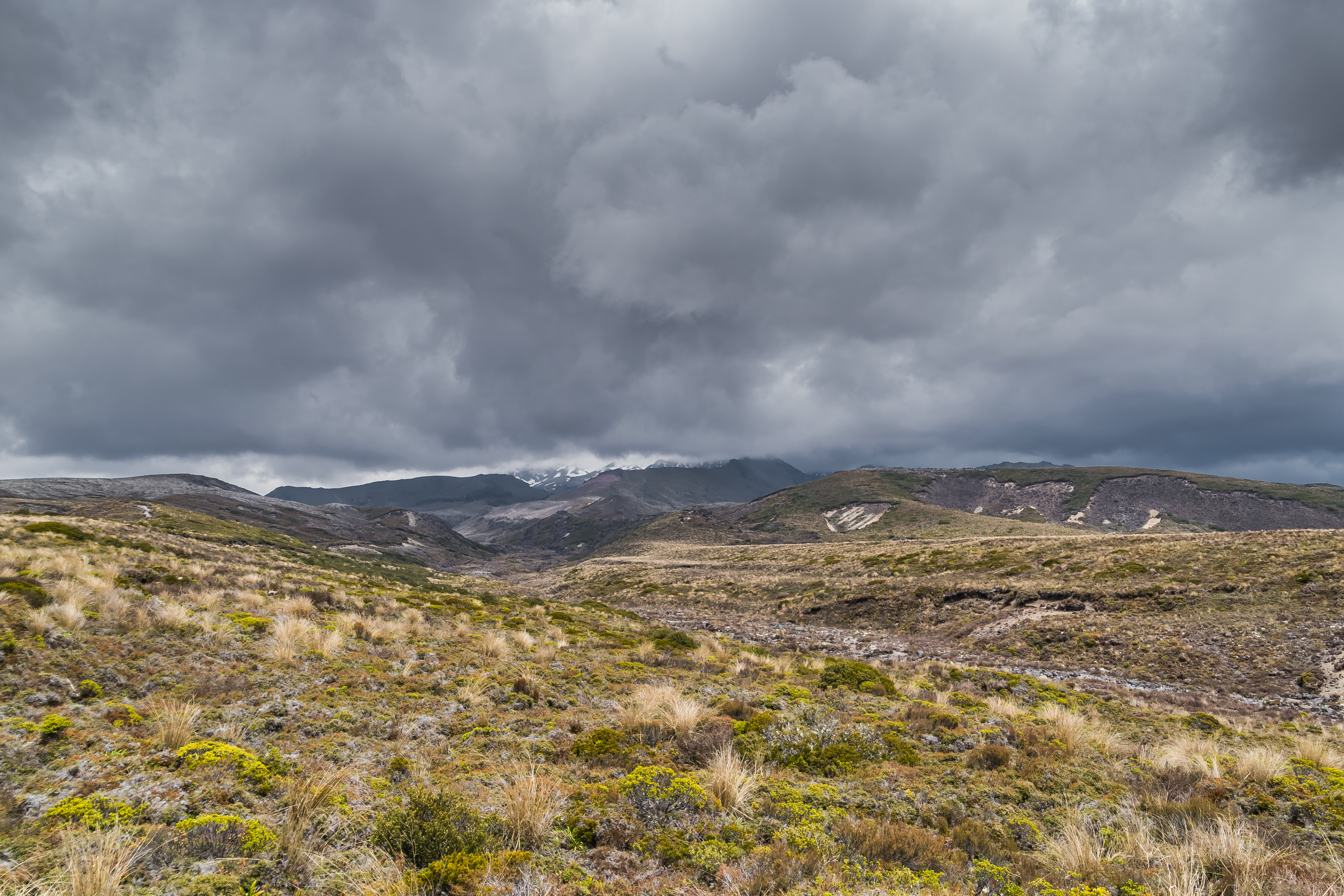
Tongariro National Park, type locality for I. emmersonorum

This species was first scientifically described by Robert Hoare in 2019. The male holotype specimen was collected by Hoare, G. Hall, and T. Sirey in December on Whakapapanui Track in the Tongariro National Park at an altitude of 1000 m. This specimen is held in the New Zealand Arthropod Collection. This species is named in honour of Alan and Kath Emmerson.

== Description ==
The adult male of this species has a wingspan of between 33.5 and 36 mm and the female of between 33 and 37 mm. It is visually similar to I. similis but can be distinguished as I. emmersonorum has wider and darker coloured forewing with a less distinct kidney mark. I. emmersonorum also has more distinct black lines along the veins of the forewing.

== Distribution ==
This species is endemic to New Zealand. This species has only been collected in the North Island Volcanic Plateau.

== Behaviour ==
The adults of this species are on the wing from November to January. This species is attracted to sugar traps and to light.

== Life history and hosts ==
The life history of this species is unknown as are the host species of its larvae. Hoare argues that the likely larval host plant of this species is a grass or grass-like plant.
