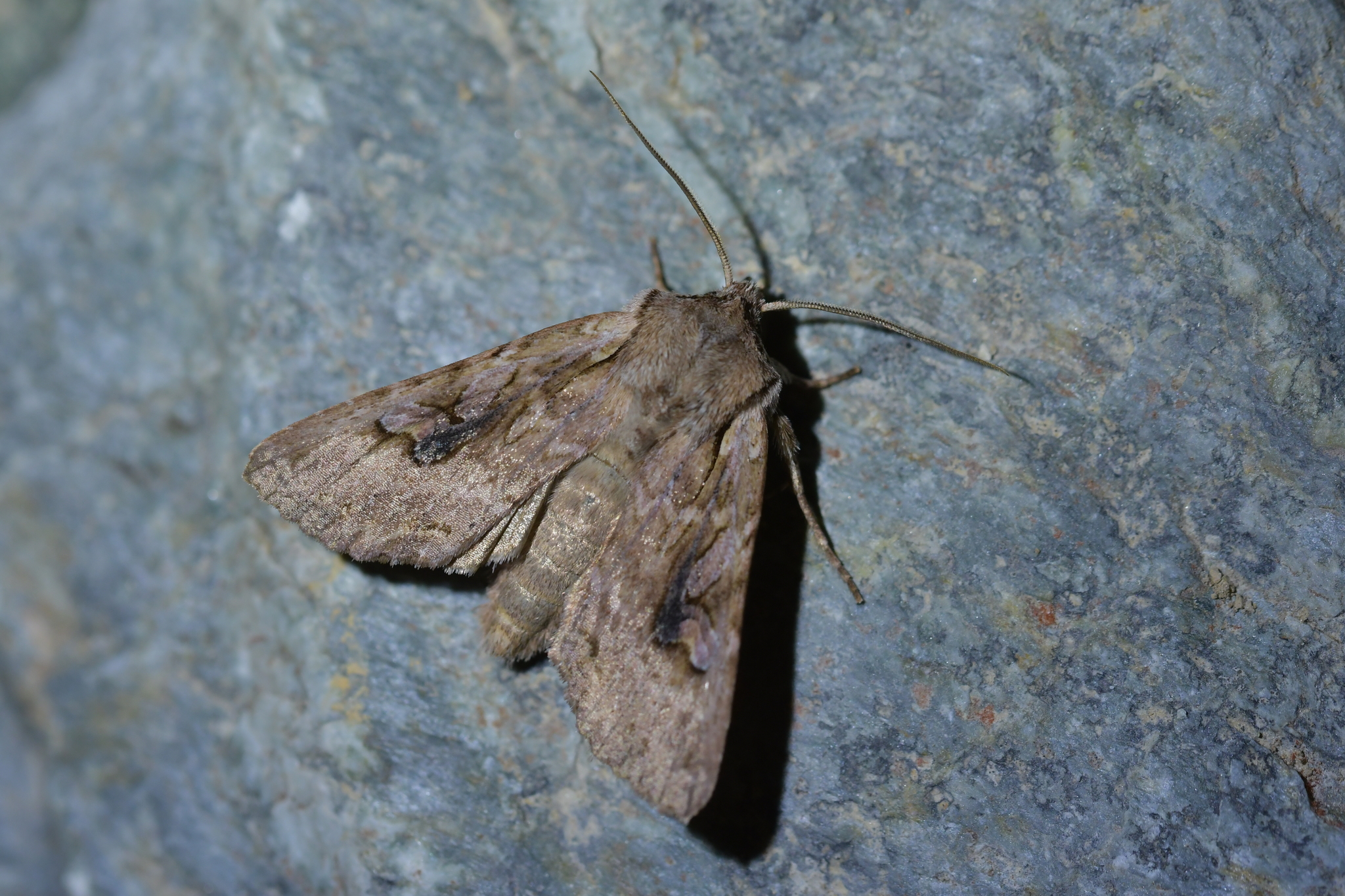

Scientific classification
- Kingdom: Animalia
- Phylum: Arthropoda
- Clade: Pancrustacea
- Class: Insecta
- Order: Lepidoptera
- Superfamily: Noctuoidea
- Family: Noctuidae
- Genus: Ichneutica
- Species: I. lindsayorum

Binomial name
- Ichneutica lindsayorum (Dugdale, 1988)

Synonyms
- Graphania lindsayi Dugdale, 1988

= Ichneutica lindsayorum =

Species of moth

Ichneutica lindsayorum is a moth of the family Noctuidae. This species is endemic to New Zealand and can be found in the southern parts of the North Island and in the South Island. I. lindsayorum is very similar in appearance to I. olivea but has a longer basal streak and lacks the white scaling from the subterminal line on the forewing that can be found on the forewings of I. olivea. The life history of this species is unknown as are the host species of its larvae in the wild. However larvae have been reared on Ozothamnus leptophyllus. The adults of this species are on the wing from December to April.

== Taxonomy ==
This species was first described by J. S. Dugdale in 1988 and named Graphania lindsayi. In 2019 Robert Hoare undertook a major review of New Zealand Noctuidae. During this review the genus Ichneutica was greatly expanded and the genus Graphania was subsumed into that genus as a synonym. As a result of this review, this species is would normally have been known as Ichneutica lindsayi. However this name was preoccupied by Ichneutica lindsayi Philpott, 1926, now a synonym of I. dione. Hoare therefore proposed the new name Ichneutica lindsayorum. The female holotype specimen was collected in Dunedin and is held at the New Zealand Arthropod Collection.

== Description ==
The adult male of this species have a wingspan of between 36 and 42 mm and the female has a wingspan of between 38 and 46 mm. I. lindsayorum is very similar in appearance to I. olivea but has a longer basal streak and lacks white scaling from the subterminal line on the forewing.

== Distribution ==
This species is endemic to New Zealand and can be found in the southern parts of the North Island and in the South Island.

== Behaviour ==
The adults of this species are on the wing from December to April.

== Life history and host species ==
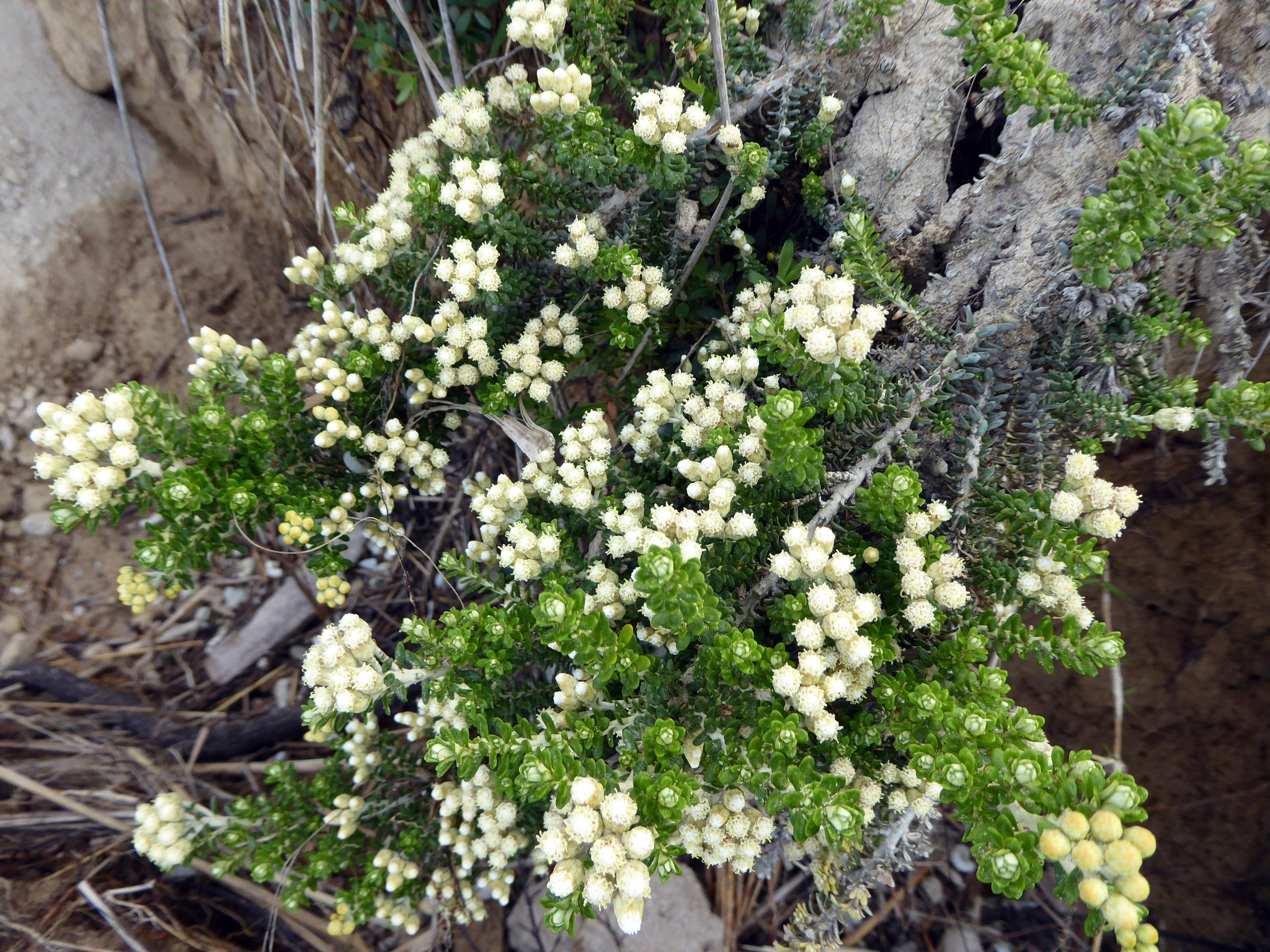
Ozothamnus leptophyllus, larvae of I. lindsayorum have been raised on this species.

The life history of this species is unknown as are the host species of its larvae in the wild. Larvae have been reared on Ozothamnus leptophyllus.
