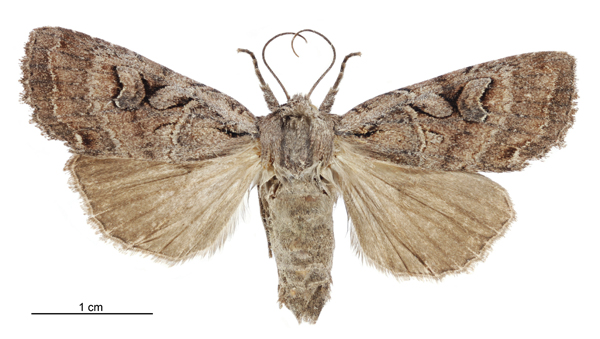
- Female
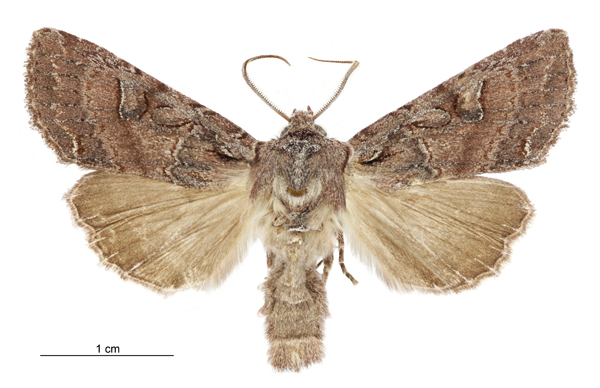
- Male

Scientific classification
- Kingdom: Animalia
- Phylum: Arthropoda
- Clade: Pancrustacea
- Class: Insecta
- Order: Lepidoptera
- Superfamily: Noctuoidea
- Family: Noctuidae
- Genus: Ichneutica
- Species: I. olivea

Binomial name
- Ichneutica olivea (Watt, 1916)

Synonyms
- Melanchra olivea Watt, 1916; Graphania olivea (Watt, 1916); Melanchra lata Philpott, 1927; Graphania lata (Philpott, 1927)

= Ichneutica olivea =

Species of moth

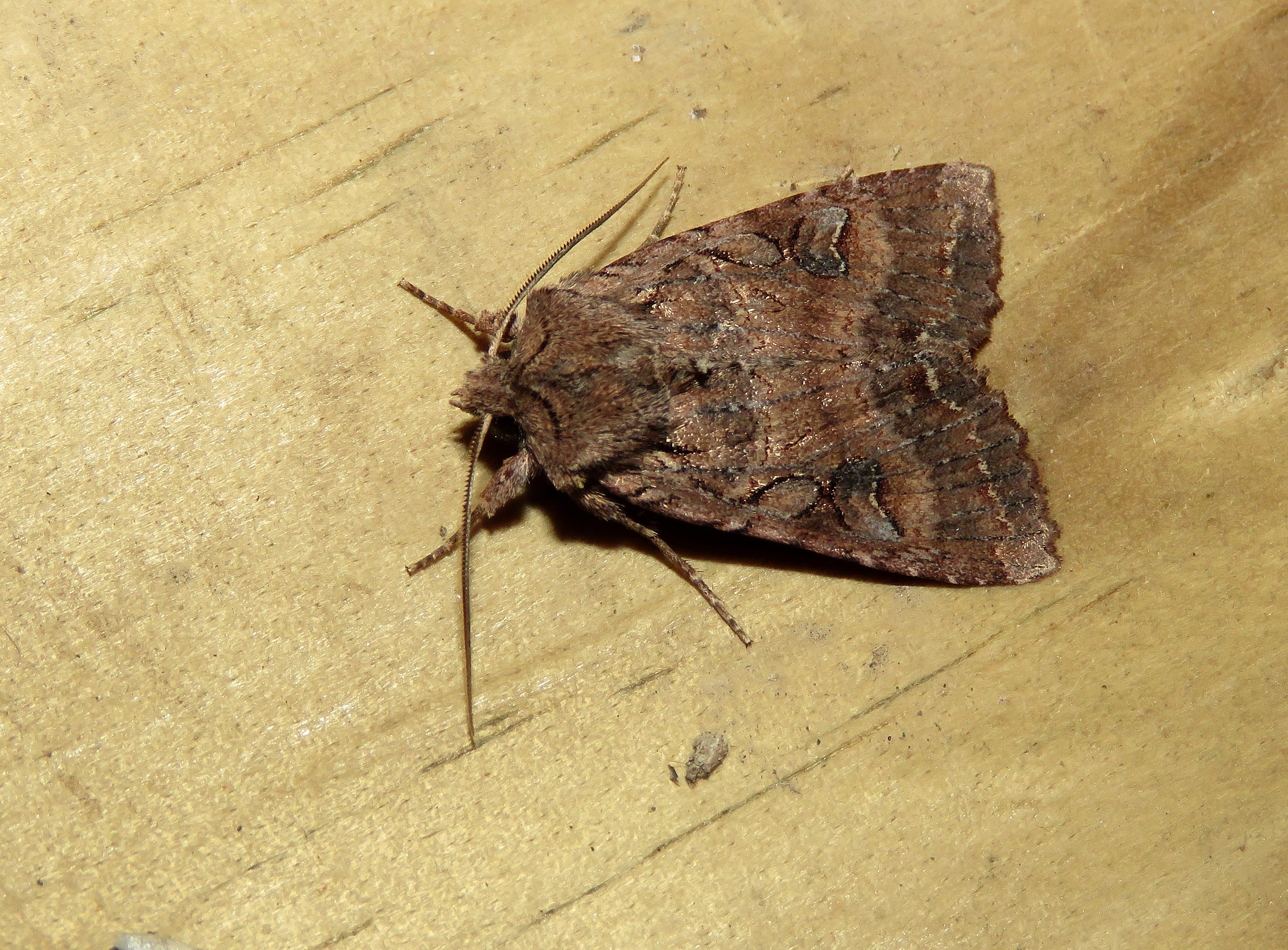
Ichneutica olivea attracted to light at night, Arthur's Pass Village.

Ichneutica olivea is a moth of the family Noctuidae. It is endemic to New Zealand and is found in the central North Island down to the central South Island. It is very similar in appearance to I. lindsayorum but has a shorter basal streak and has white scaling from the subterminal line on the forewings that I. lindsayorum lacks This species prefers shrubland habitat. The life history of I. olivea is unknown as are the host species of its larvae. The adults are on the wing from December to March and are attracted to light.

== Taxonomy ==
This species was first described by Morris N. Watt in 1916 using a specimen he obtained in January at Mount Taranaki. Watt originally named the species Melanchra olivea. The holotype specimen used by Watt to describe the species has been lost. However the paratype series of specimens collected by Watt in 1916 are held at the Museum of New Zealand Te Papa Tongarewa. In 1988 J. S. Dugdale, in his catalogue of New Zealand Lepidoptera, placed this species within the Graphania genus. In 2019 Robert Hoare undertook a major review of New Zealand Noctuidae. During this review the genus Ichneutica was greatly expanded and the genus Graphania was subsumed into that genus as a synonym. As a result of this review, this species is now known as Ichneutica olivea.

== Description ==
Watt described the species as follows:

Expanse of wings slightly under 1 3/4 in. The antennae of the male are deeply serrated, with the serrations finely ciliated. The forewings are very rich brown, strongly tinged with claret-colour; there is a short blackish-brown basal streak, very broad at the base; the first line is slightly curved oblique, extending from 1/4 of costa to 1/3 of dorsum; the claviform is large; the orbicular is large, oval, oblique, not closed towards the costa; the reniform very large, ear-shaped, also open towards the costa, and inwardly edged with whitish towards the termen; both reniform and orbicular are sharply outlined in very dark rich brown; there is also a darker brownish cloud between them; the second line is rich brown finely waved, indistinct except towards the dorsum; the subterminal line is rusty-brown, obscurely edged with whitish ochreous; the terminal area is obscurely clouded with blackish; the hindwings are dark brown, paler towards the base.

The adult males of this species have a wingspan of between 38 and 42 mm while the females have a wingspan of between 42 and 46 mm. It is very similar in appearance to I. lindsayorum but has a shorter basal streak and has white scaling from the subterminal line on the forewings that I. lindsayorum lacks.

== Distribution ==
It is endemic to New Zealand. This species is found in the central North Island down to the central South Island.

== Habitat ==
This species prefers shrubland habitat.

== Behaviour ==
The adults are on the wing from December to March and are attracted to light.

== Life history and host species ==
The life history of this species is unknown as are the host species of its larvae.
