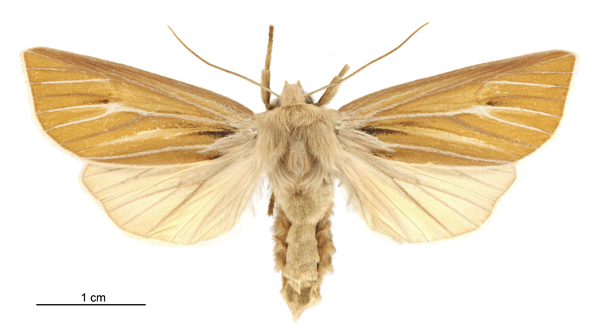
- Female
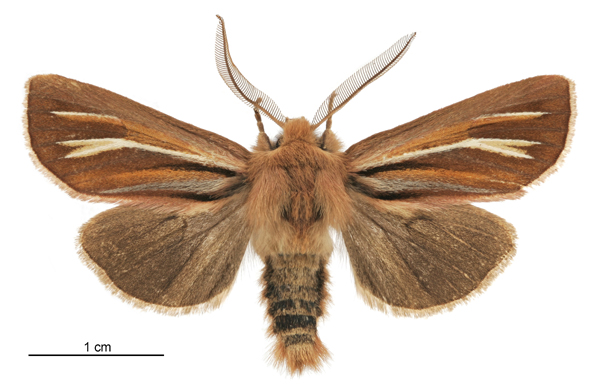
- Male

Scientific classification
- Kingdom: Animalia
- Phylum: Arthropoda
- Clade: Pancrustacea
- Class: Insecta
- Order: Lepidoptera
- Superfamily: Noctuoidea
- Family: Noctuidae
- Genus: Ichneutica
- Species: I. ceraunias

Binomial name
- Ichneutica ceraunias Meyrick, 1887

Synonyms
- Ichneutica caraunias Meyrick, 1887

= Ichneutica ceraunias =

Species of moth endemic to New Zealand

Ichneutica ceraunias (also known as the snow tussock wainscot) is a moth of the family Noctuidae. It is endemic to New Zealand. This species is found from the central North Island to the bottom of the South Island. Hosts of the larvae are species of Chionochloa and Festuca. This colourful moth is variable in appearance and can be mistaken for Ichneutica dione. Adults are on the wing from October to February.

== Taxonomy ==
This species was first described in 1887 by Edward Meyrick using a male specimen collected at Mount Arthur under the name I. ceraunias. This species name has been misspelt as Ichneutica caraunias.

I. ceraunias was discussed and illustrated by George Hudson in his books published in 1898 and 1928. John S. Dugdale agreed with the placement of this species within the Ichneutica genus in 1988. Robert J. B. Hoare also confirmed the placement of this species within the Ichneutica genus in his major review of New Zealand Noctuidae species in 2019.

== Description ==
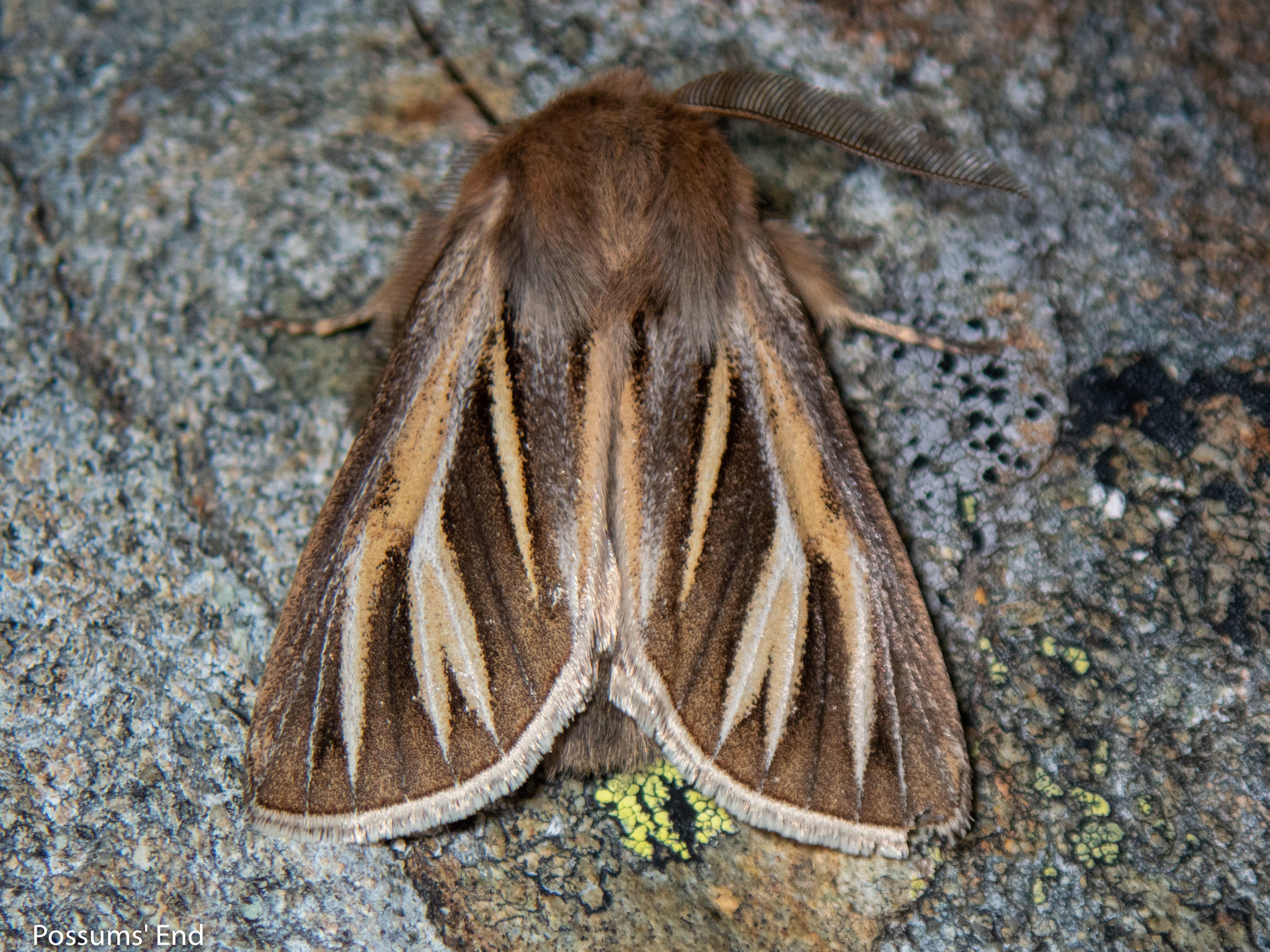
Ichneutica ceraunias observed in the St Bathans Mountains

Meyrick originally described this species as follows:

41 mm. Head, palpi, antennae, thorax, abdomen, and legs brownish-ochreous; palpi externally suffused with dark fuscous; stalk of antennae white above. Forewings moderately dilated, costa almost straight, apex obtuse, hindmargin rather oblique, rounded beneath; whitish-ochreous, brownish-tinged; a pale yellow-ochreous gradually dilated streak from base above middle to 3/5, where it separates abruptly into two strong remote branches, nearly reaching hindmargin, upper acutely pointed, lower with two acute points; space between and beyond these, and on a broad streak beneath them, reaching from 1/3 to hindmargin but acutely attenuated anteriorly, ochreous-brown, sprinkled with black on margins; a small blackish spot between branches at origin, and an irregular black divided streak from base beneath median streaks to middle : cilia whitish-ochreous (imperfect). Hindwings light fuscous-grey; cilia whitish-ochreous (imperfect).

This species is variable in the intensity of its colour and markings with darker specimens being found in the South. The pale streaks on the forewing help identify this species but some forms of I. dione can be confused with I. ceraunias. Some populations have full winged females, others have brachypterous, flightless females with the form of the wing reduction being variable.

The larvae of the species has been partially described but there is no full description of the larvae of this species.

== Geographic range ==
I. ceraunias is found from central North Island down and throughout the South Island.

== Habitat ==
The species inhabits the alpine zone in the northern sections of its range down to sea-level in the south.

== Host species ==
The larvae of I. ceraunias feed on Chionochloa and Festuca species.

== Behaviour ==
Although adult moths are known to fly during the day it is more common to see them at night. They are attracted to light. Adults are on the wing from October to February.

== Conservation ==
Currently this species is not listed as in need of conservation efforts.
