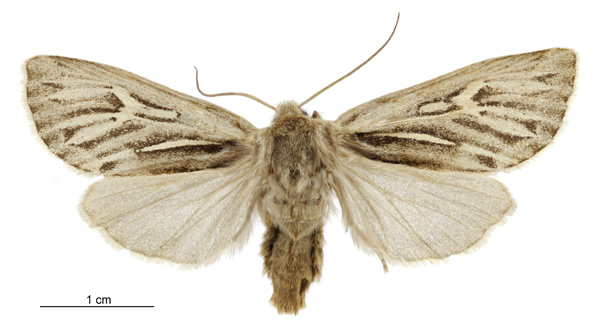
- Female
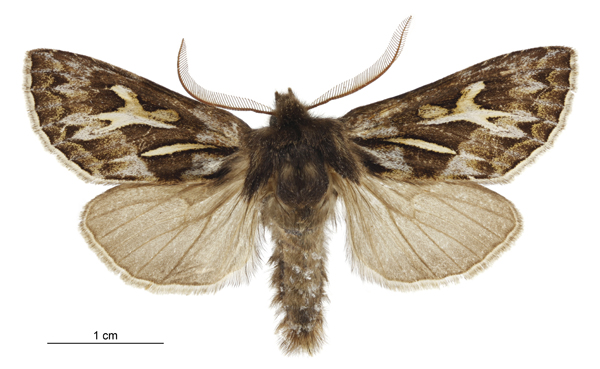
- Male

Scientific classification
- Kingdom: Animalia
- Phylum: Arthropoda
- Clade: Pancrustacea
- Class: Insecta
- Order: Lepidoptera
- Superfamily: Noctuoidea
- Family: Noctuidae
- Genus: Ichneutica
- Species: I. dione

Binomial name
- Ichneutica dione Hudson, 1898

Synonyms
- Ichneutica lindsayi Philpott, 1926

= Ichneutica dione =

Species of moth endemic to New Zealand

Ichneutica dione is a moth of the family Noctuidae. It is endemic to New Zealand. This moth species is closely related to I. ceraunias and is very similar in appearance to that species. However I. dione has a much more restrictive range, being found only in the alpine zone and hills of the South Island and is less commonly collected. Adults of the species are on the wing from December to February and although sometimes can be found flying during the day, they are more commonly seen at night.

== Taxonomy ==
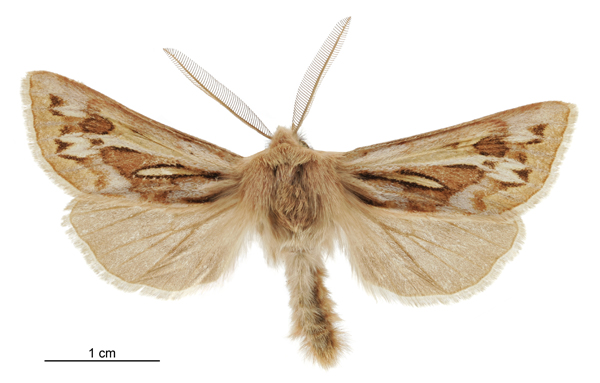

I. dione was first described by George Hudson in his book New Zealand moths and butterflies (Macro-lepidoptera). Hudson used a specimen collected by C. W. Palmer on Mount Arthur at an altitude of around 1350m. The holotype specimen is held at Te Papa Tongarewa. Hudson went on to illustrate and discuss this species in 1928. In 1988 Dugdale confirmed this species belonged in the Ichneutica genus. Robert J. B. Hoare, while undertaking a major review of New Zealand noctuids, inspected the holotype specimen of this species and confirmed its placement within the genus Ichneutica. In that review Hoare also synonymised I. lindsayi into I. dione. Hoare based this decision on the similarity of the dissected holotype specimen of I. lindsayi to I. dione, as well as the wing pattern of I. lindsayi being found both in the species I. dione and I. ceraunias.

== Description ==
Hudson originally described the species as follows:

The expansion of the wings is 1 1/2 inches. The fore-wings are dull blackish-brown, darker near the middle; there is a rather oblique, white, longitudinal stripe below the middle from about one-eighth to one-third; above this there is a very conspicuous, large, elongate white mark; this mark has a semicircular indentation above, probably representing the orbicular; another indentation towards the termen, probably representing the reniform, and below this it emits two short teeth-like projections; beyond these markings the ground colour becomes paler, and is traversed by an obscure, jagged, transverse line; the cilia are grey. The hind-wings are pale grey; the cilia are also grey. The body is dark brownish-black.

I. dione is very similar in appearance to I. ceraunias as the two species are closely related. The two species are both variable but were previously distinguished by I. ceraunias having a pale streak in the discal cell of the forewings. However the dissection of the genitalia of male specimens indicate that this distinguishing feature is also present on I. dione specimens. A male I. dione may have a distinctive Y-shaped marking on their forewing disk. Alternatively those male specimens that have a pale section on their forewings separated from the post discal streaks by a dark patch of wing scales are likely to be I. dione. The female I. dione can be distinguished by the presence of a dark subterminal streak on the forewing.

== Geographic range ==
I. dione is found only in the South Island of New Zealand.

== Habitat ==
This species inhabits the alpine zone of mountains and hills in the South Island. I. dione has a more restrictive range than I. ceraunias.

== Host species ==
Although yet to be confirmed it is assumed, as a result of the close relationship between I. dione and I. ceraunias, that I. dione larvae feed on Chionochloa, Poa or Festuca species.

== Behaviour ==
The adults of this species are on the wing from December to February. Like I. ceraunias adults of this species are sometimes found flying during the day, although it is more common to find them at night.
