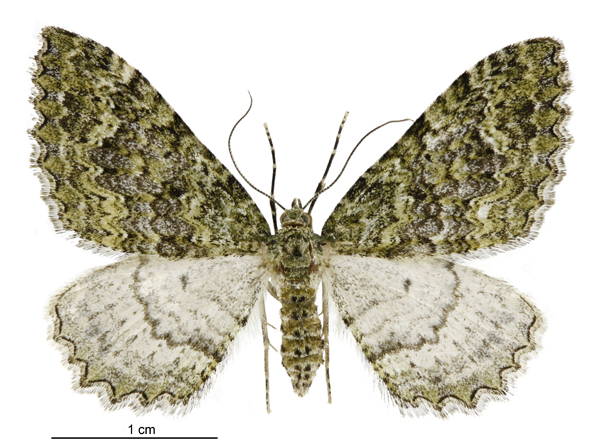
- Female
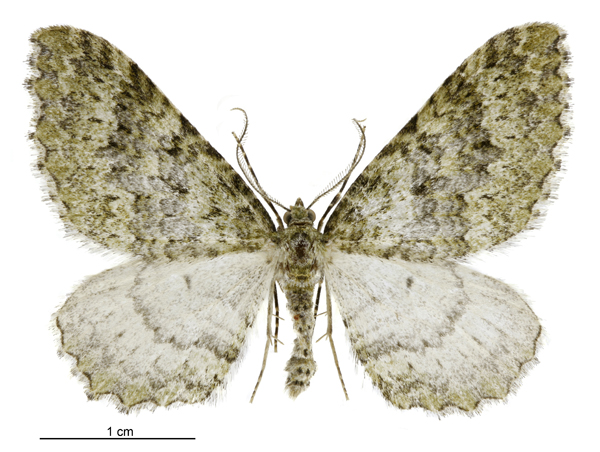
- Male

Scientific classification
- Domain: Eukaryota
- Kingdom: Animalia
- Phylum: Arthropoda
- Class: Insecta
- Order: Lepidoptera
- Family: Geometridae
- Genus: Austrocidaria
- Species: A. umbrosa

Binomial name
- Austrocidaria umbrosa (Philpott, 1917)

Synonyms
- Xanthorhoe umbrosa Philpott, 1917

= Austrocidaria umbrosa =

Species of moth endemic to New Zealand

Austrocidaria umbrosa is a species of moth of the family Geometridae. It endemic to New Zealand and has been observed in the South Island in Fiordland. Adults have been recorded as being on the wing in December, January and March. They are nocturnal and have been collected on and around Dracophyllum longifolium.

== Taxonomy ==
This species was first described in 1917 by Alfred Philpott using specimens collected at Mount Cleughearn in Fiordland at around 3,250 ft and named Xanthorhoe umbrosa. In 1928 George Hudson discussed and illustrated this species under that name in his book The butterflies and moths of New Zealand. In 1988 John S. Dugdale placed this species in the genus Austrocidaria. The male holotype specimen is held at the New Zealand Arthropod Collection.

== Description ==
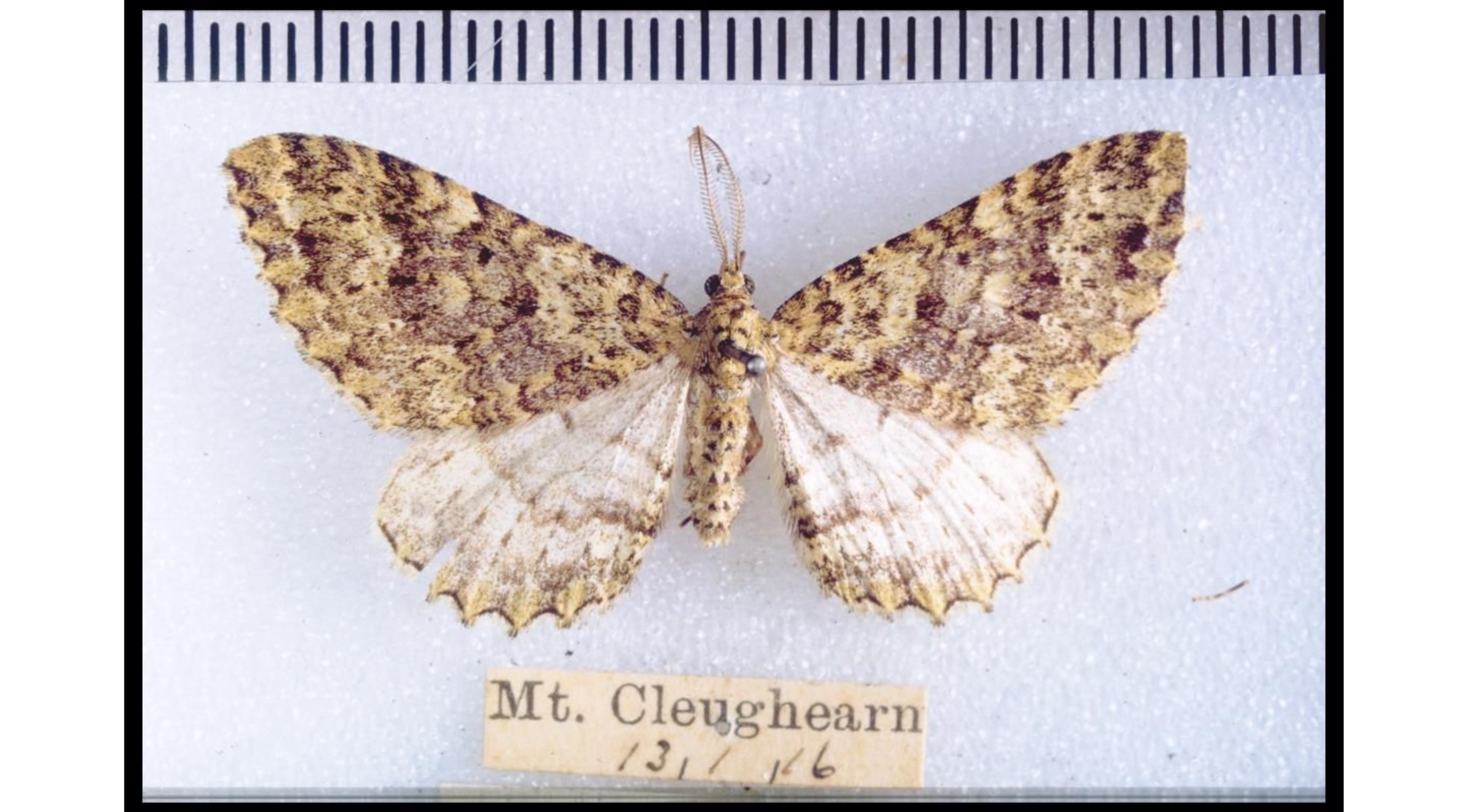
Male holotype specimen.

Philpott described this species as follows:

♂♀. 33-40 mm. Head, palpi, and thorax dull-greenish, tinged with ochreous and sprinkled with blackish. Antennae moderately bipectinated, brownish-ochreous. Abdomen ochreous-grey with paired black dorsal dots on each segment. Forewings triangular, costa almost straight, termen waved, bowed, oblique; dull green, ochreous-tinged; veins interruptedly outlined in black; numerous obscure irregularly-dentate fuscous transverse fasciae; five of these fasciae, having the interspaces suffused with fuscous, form the median band, anterior margin of which is irregularly curved from 1/3 costa to 1/3 dorsum, the posterior margin, from 2/3 costa to 2/3 dorsum, has a moderate blunt double projection at middle; a black discal dot; an obscure waved pale subterminal line, suffusedly margined with fuscous anteriorly; a waved black terminal line : cilia greenish-grey, mixed and suffusedly barred with fuscous, and with a pale median line. Hindwings with termen rounded, crenate; greenish-grey; the markings of the forewings faintly reproduced but less curved and dentate; a prominent black crenate terminal line : cilia as in forewings. Undersides grey, with fuscous markings of upper sides clearly shown.

This species is similar in appearance to Austrocidaria cedrinodes but can be distinguished as a result of its larger size.

== Distribution ==
A. umbrosa is endemic to New Zealand. This species has been observed only in the South Island, in Fiordland.

== Behaviour ==
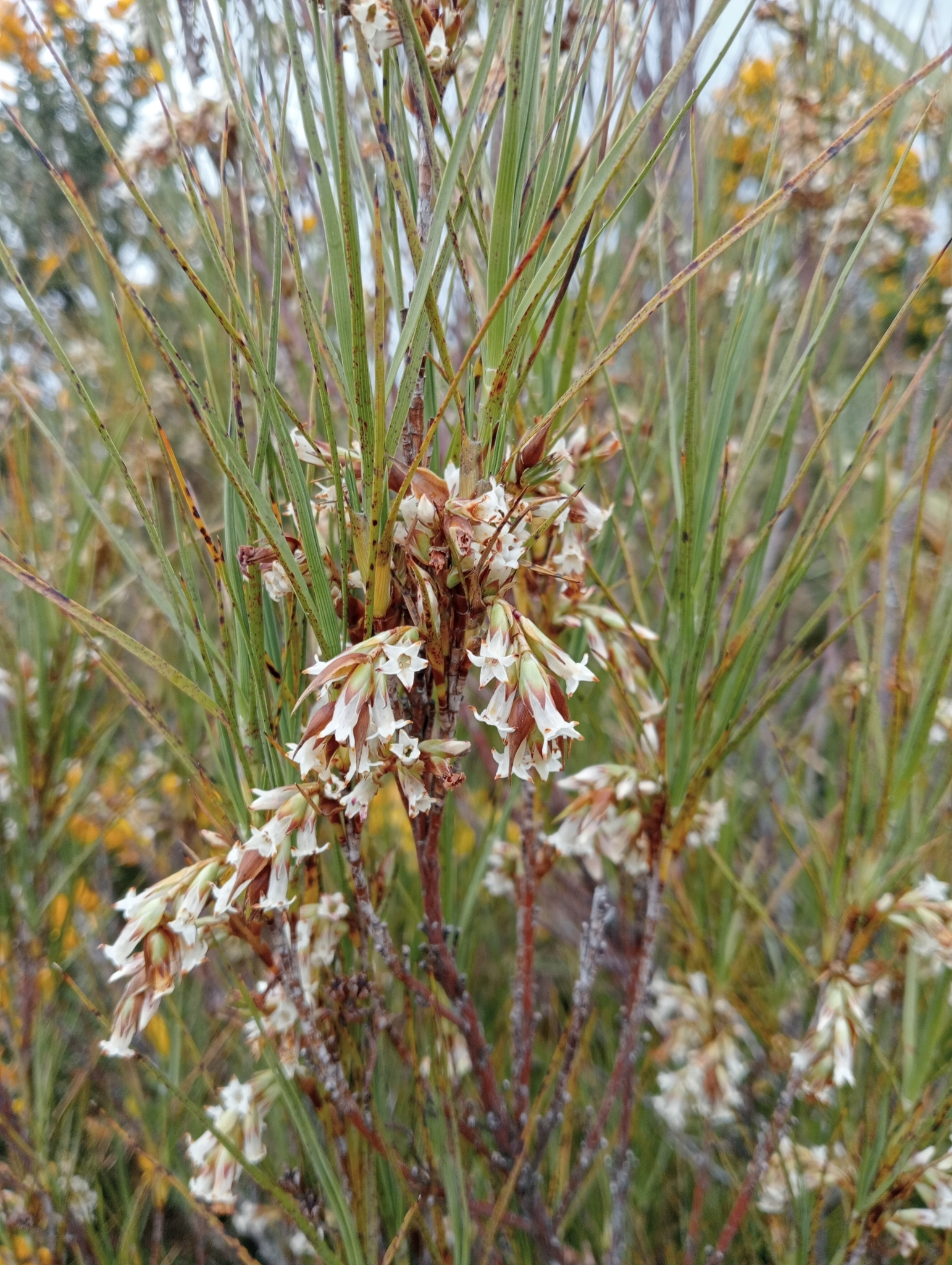
D. longifolium.

Adults of this species have been recorded as being on the wing in December, January and March. They are nocturnal and have an affinity for Dracophyllum longifolium.
