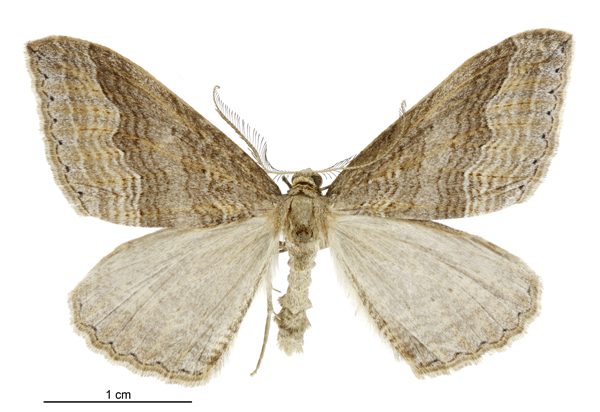
- Male

Scientific classification
- Domain: Eukaryota
- Kingdom: Animalia
- Phylum: Arthropoda
- Class: Insecta
- Order: Lepidoptera
- Family: Geometridae
- Genus: Austrocidaria
- Species: A. stricta

Binomial name
- Austrocidaria stricta (Philpott, 1915)

Synonyms
- Xanthorhoe stricta Philpott, 1915

= Austrocidaria stricta =

Species of moth endemic to New Zealand

Austrocidaria stricta is a species of moth of the family Geometridae. This species was described by Alfred Philpott in 1915. It endemic to New Zealand and has been observed in the Fiordland and Otago regions. A. stricta inhabits upland scrubland. Larvae feed on the leaves of Coprosma species. Adults are on the wing in February and March.

== Taxonomy ==
This species was first described by Alfred Philpott in 1915 using specimens collected on Bold Peak in the Humboldt Range by George Howes in February and named Xanthorhoe stricta. George Hudson discussed and illustrated this species in his 1928 book The butterflies and moths of New Zealand. In 1988 John S. Dugdale placed this species in the genus Austrocidaria. The male holotype specimen is held at Te Papa.

== Description ==
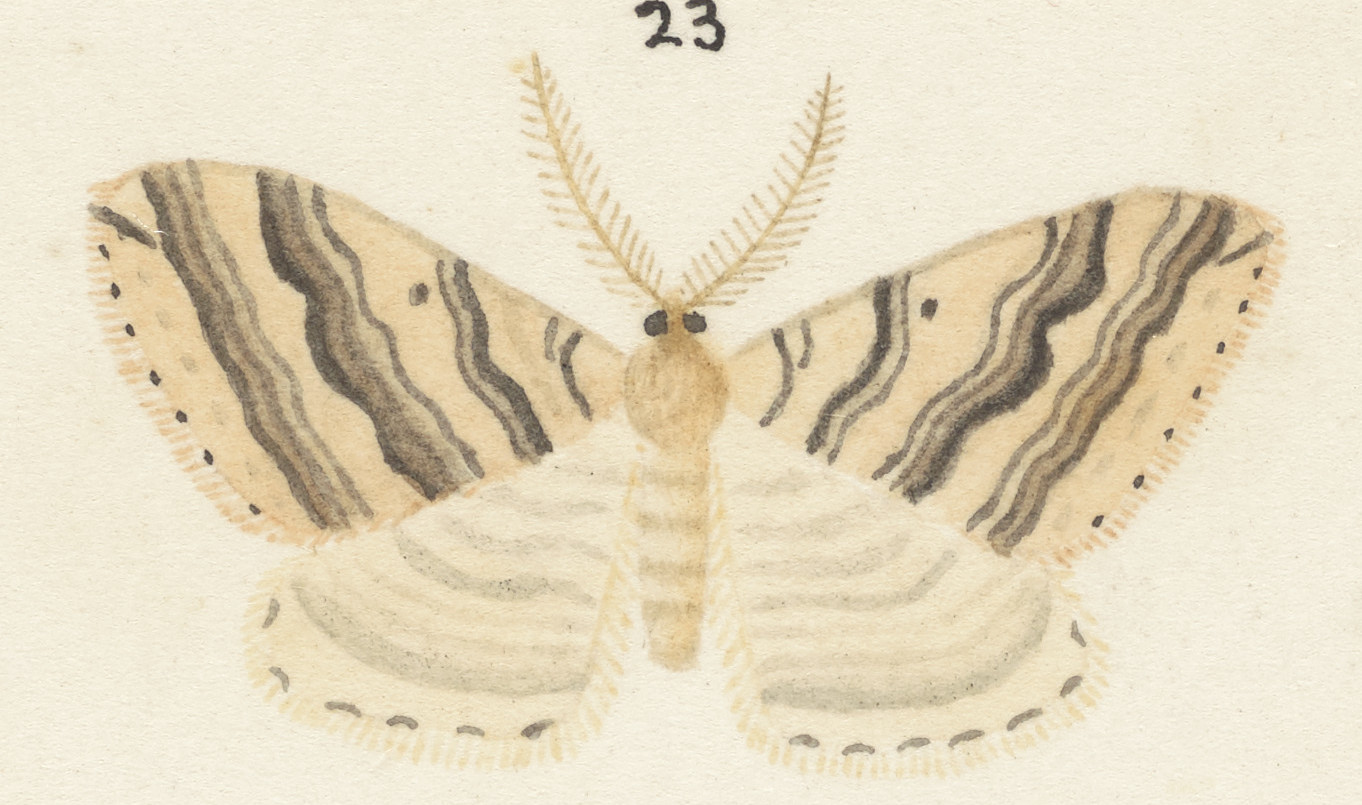
Male

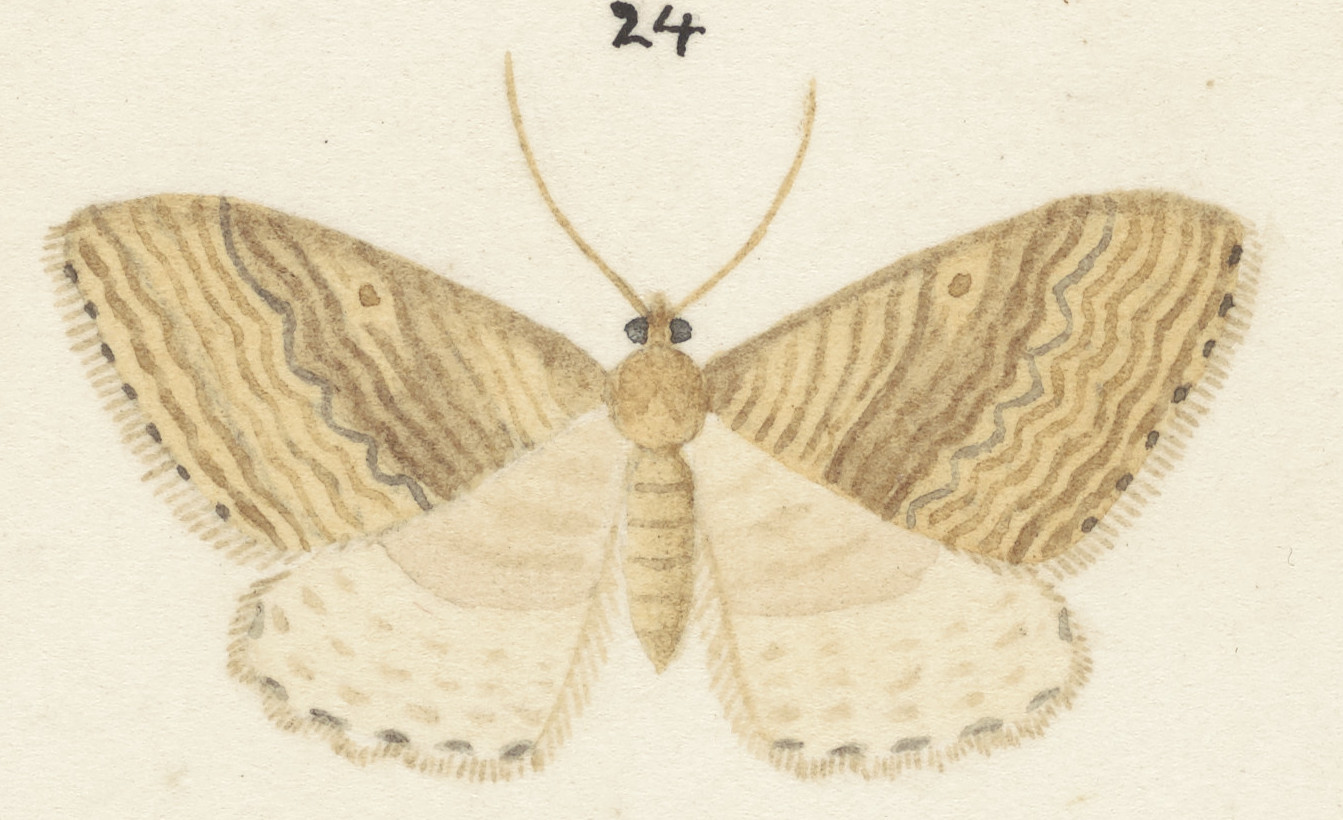
Female

Philpott described this species as follows:

♂. 38-39 mm. Head, palpi, thorax, and abdomen pale greyish-ochreous. Antennal pectinations moderately long. Forewings triangular, costa almost straight, rather strongly arched apically, termen subsinuate, oblique; pale greyish-ochreous; markings fuscous-brown; numerous thin waved more or less parallel transverse lines, forming more distinct bands near base, before middle, at f and J; an obscure discal dot; outer margin of third band sinuate inwards above and below middle; an inwardly oblique thin subapical streak; a terminal series of black dots, connected by a very faint waved line. Hindwings pale ochreous-grey with markings similar to forewings but suffused and obscure : cilia as in forewings.

This species is very similar in appearance to Asaphodes cataphracta but can be distinguished from that species by the absence of the white fasciae and the somewhat longer antennal pectinations.

== Distribution ==
This species is endemic to New Zealand. Other than the type locality of Bold Peak, this species has been observed in the Hunter Mountains in Fiordland, at an elevation of 3000 ft. It has also been observed in the Dansey ecological district in Otago.

== Habitat and hosts ==
This species inhabits upland shrubland. The larvae feed on the leaves of Coprosma species.

== Behaviour ==
The adults of this species are on the wing in February and March.
