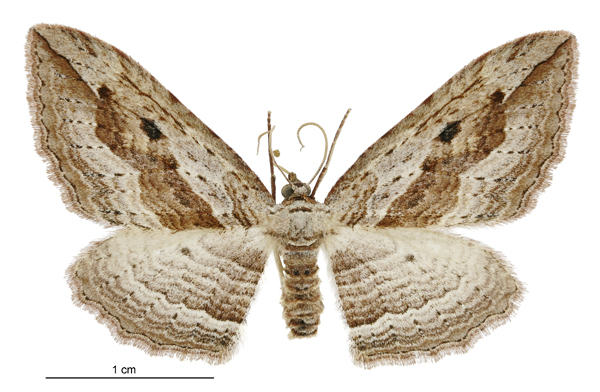
- Female
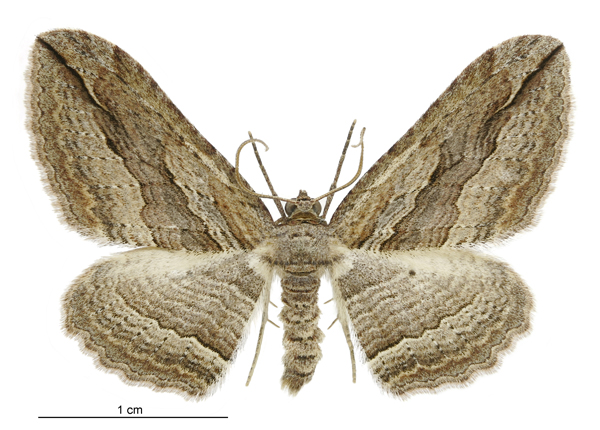
- Male

Scientific classification
- Kingdom: Animalia
- Phylum: Arthropoda
- Class: Insecta
- Order: Lepidoptera
- Family: Geometridae
- Genus: Austrocidaria
- Species: A. gobiata

Binomial name
- Austrocidaria gobiata (Felder & Rogenhofer, 1875)

Synonyms
- Cidaria gobiata Felder & Rogenhofer, 1875; Phibalapteryx simulans Butler, 1879; Phibalapteryx undulifera Butler, 1879; Phibalapteryx rivularis Butler, 1879; Eucymatoge gobiata (Felder & Rogenhofer, 1875); Eucymatoge dryocyma Meyrick, 1938; Horisme gobiata ab. fasciata Prout, 1939

= Austrocidaria gobiata =

Species of moth endemic to New Zealand

Austrocidaria gobiata, also known as the barred Coprosma carpet or the pale oblique-barred moth, is a species of moth of the family Geometridae. It is endemic to New Zealand and is found throughout the country. It inhabits native forest, particular areas where its larval host plant, Coprosma areolata, is common. The larvae of this species feed at night and are well camouflaged as a result of their external morphology during the day when they rest. A. gobiata pupate in the leaf litter or amongst the leaves of their host plant. Adults are on the wing all year but are commonly observed from October to April. Adults are nocturnal and are attracted to light. The larvae of this species play host to the fly Pales aurea.

== Taxonomy ==
This species was first described by Cajetan von Felder and Alois Friedrich Rogenhofer in 1875 and originally named Cidaria gobiata. George Hudson in his 1928 publication The butterflies and moths of New Zealand discussed and illustrated this species under the name Eucymatoge gobiata. In 1988 John S. Dugdale placed this species in the genus Austrocidaria. The female holotype, collected by Thomas R. Oxley in Nelson, is held at the Natural History Museum, London.

== Description ==
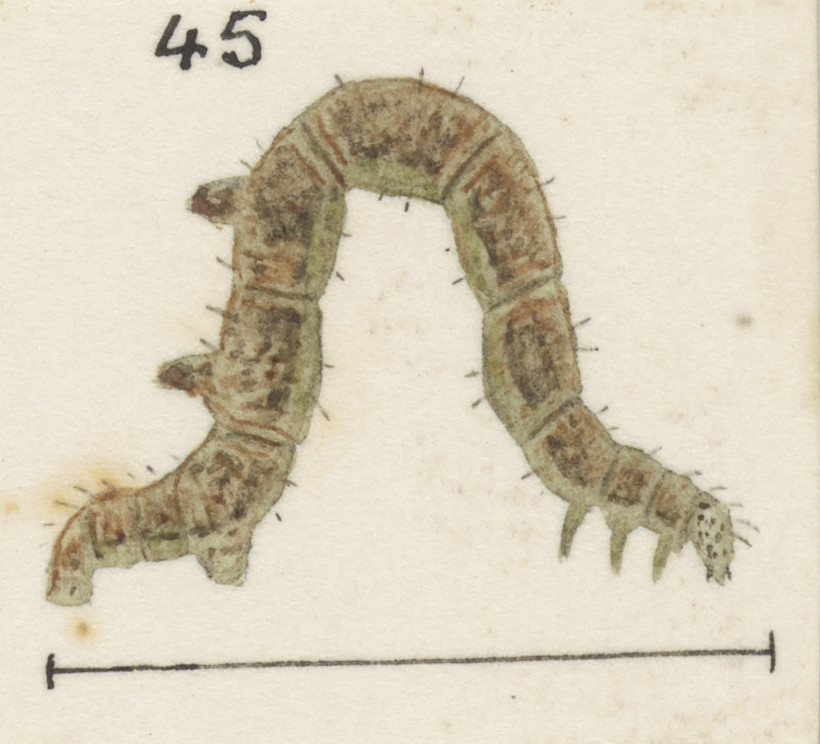
Larva

Hudson described the larva of this species as follows:

... about 1 inch in length, moderately stout, slightly attenuated at each end; pale dull brownish-green obscurely streaked and mottled with pale reddish-brown and blackish; there are two very large humps on segments 8 and 9; the skin is considerably wrinkled with a few scattered short bristles.

Hudson regarded larvae of A. gobiata as being well adapted for concealment amongst the twigs of its food plant, Coprosma areolata.

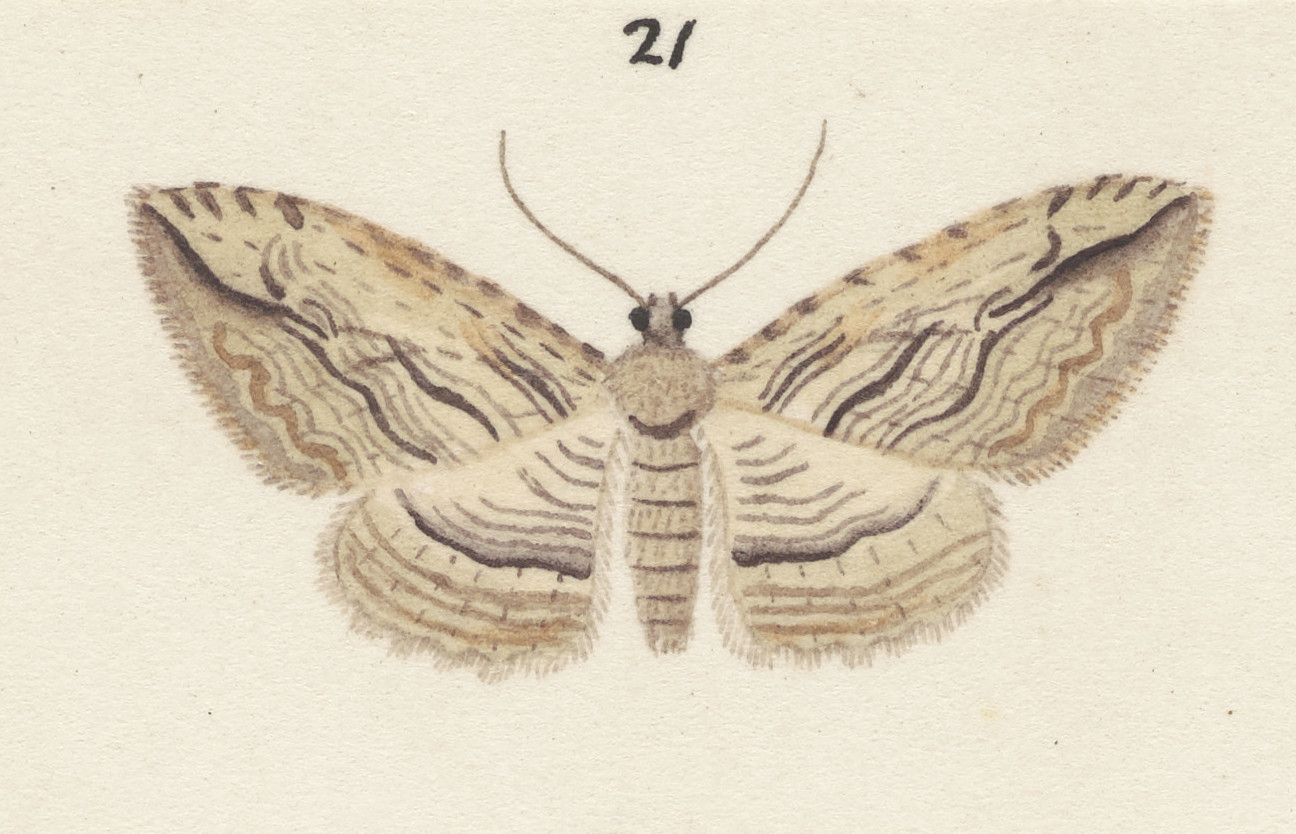
Illustration of male.

Hudson also described the adults of this species as follows:

The expansion of the wings is 1 1/4 inches. The fore-wings, which have the costa rather strongly arched and the termen slightly oblique, are very pale purplish-grey with dark brown and pale reddish-brown markings; there are two very oblique, wavy, dark brown transverse lines on the dorsum at about 1/8 and 1/3 which reach a little more than half way to the costa; between these two lines there are several fainter reddish-brown lines; a very conspicuous oblique line runs from the apex to the middle of dorsum; this line is double near the middle of its course where it encloses a small oval space; on either side of this oblique line there are numerous paler brown wavy lines which become considerably stronger and more reddish towards the termen; all the veins are dotted in brown. The hind-wings are very pale purplish-grey with a strong wavy dark brown transverse line below the middle and numerous fine paler brown transverse lines, redder towards the termen; all these lines fade away towards the costa. The head thorax and abdomen are pale purplish grey with brown transverse markings which correspond to a great extent with the lines on the fore- and hind- wings.

Adults are variable in appearance however most specimens of this species can be recognised by the dark diagonal dash on the tips of its forewings. This species can be distinguished from its sister species Austrocidaria anguligera as A. gobiata has smooth margins to its wings.

== Distribution ==
This species is endemic to New Zealand. A. gobiata has been observed in the North, South and Stewart Islands.

== Habitat and hosts ==
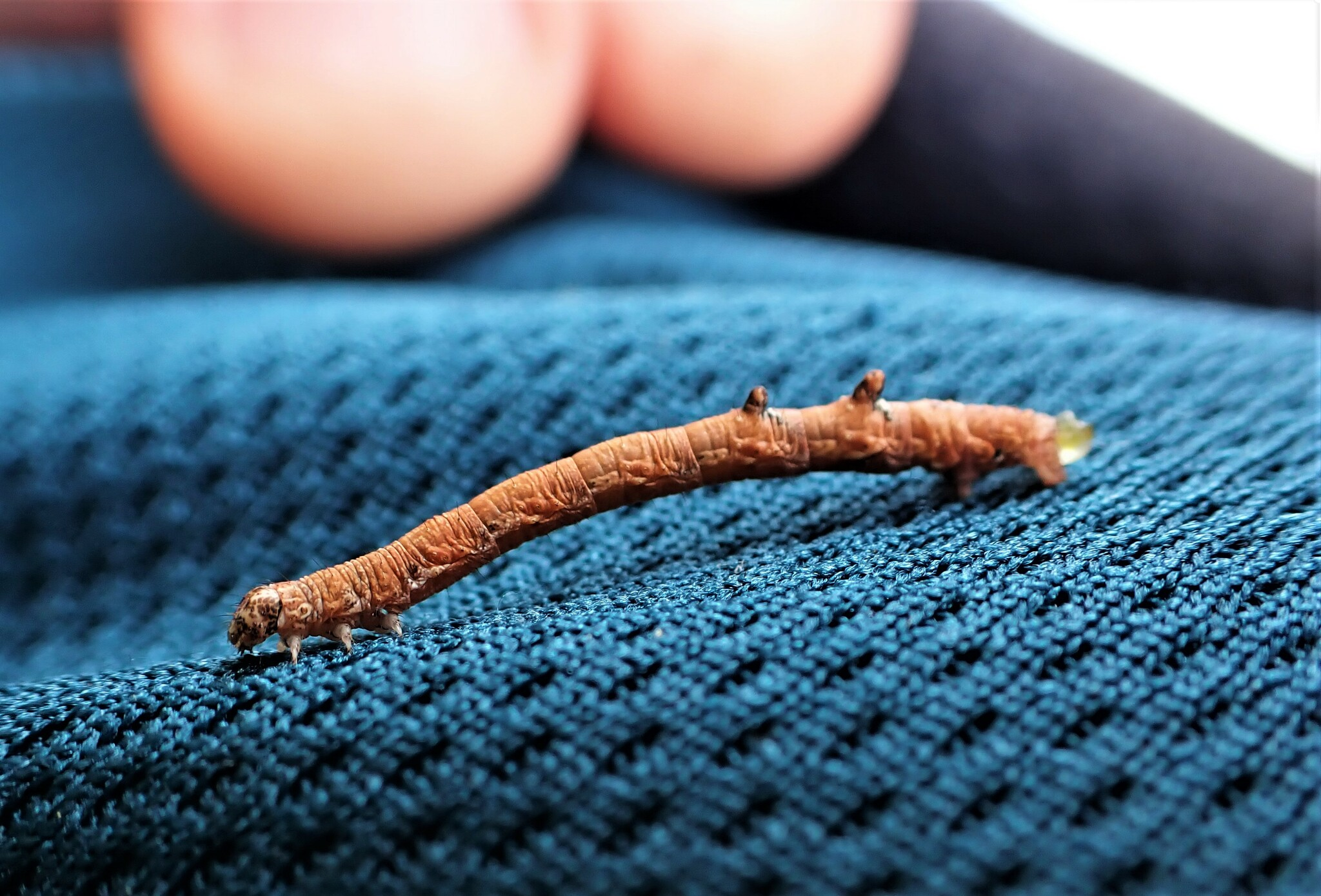
A. gobiata larva

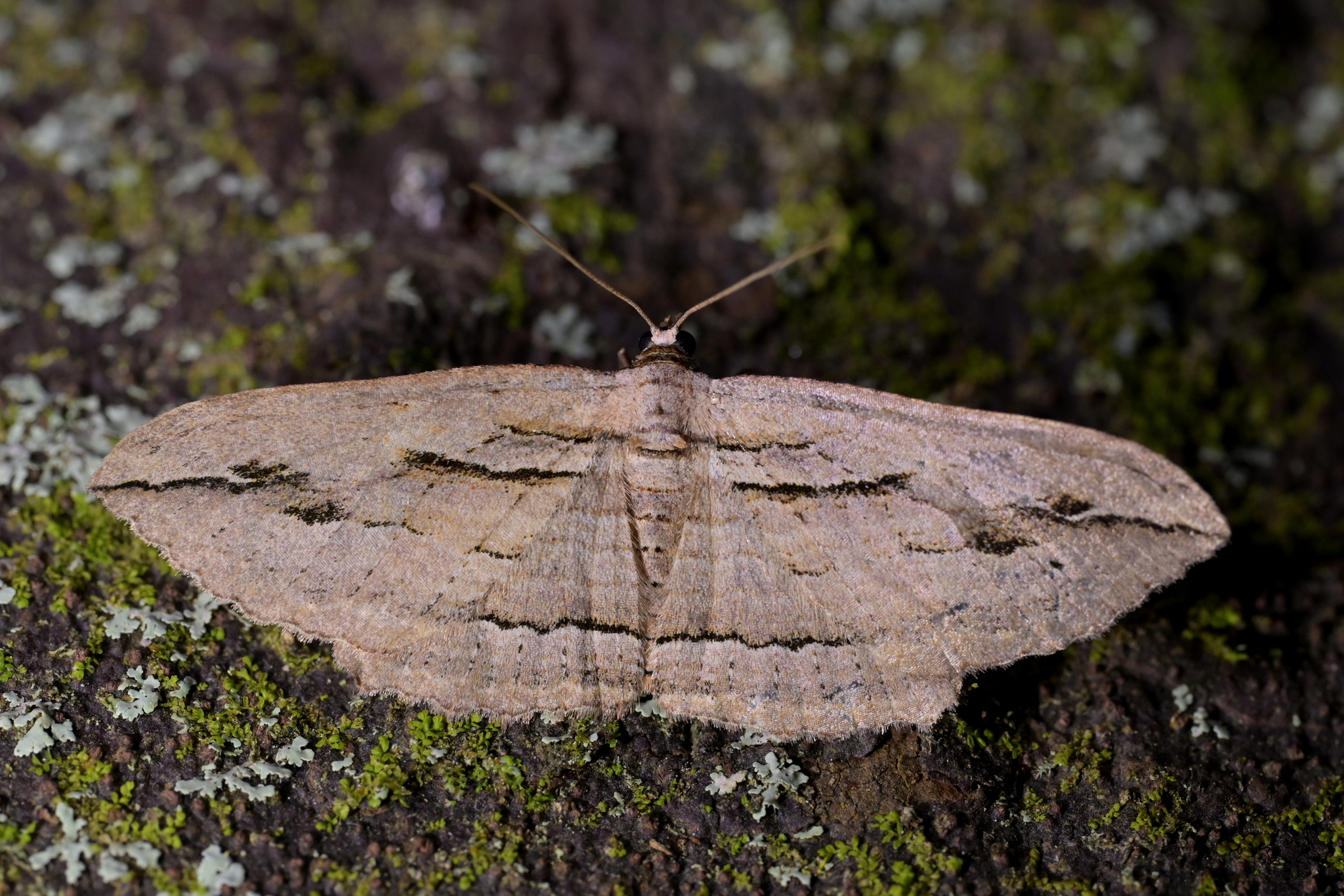
Adult at rest.

This species inhabits native forest and have been collected on wind-swept scrubby hilltops where its host plant is abundant. The larvae of this species feed on Coprosma areolata.

== Behaviour ==
Adults are nocturnal and are attracted to light. Hudson hypothesised that there were two broods per year and that the species passed the winter months in its larval stage. He regarded the larvae of A. gobiata as sluggish in behaviour. The larvae are well camouflaged and are nocturnal in behaviour, feeding only at night and resting during the day. A. gobiata pupate in leaf litter under their larval host plant or alternatively amongst the host plant leaves. Adults are on the wing all months of the year but are most commonly observed from October to April.

== Pests ==
The larvae of this species plays host to the fly species Pales aurea with the adult fly emerging from the moth pupa.
