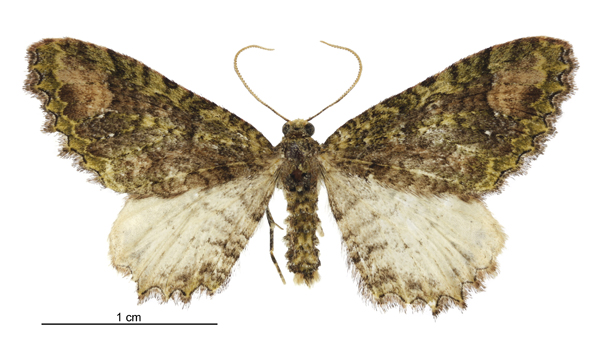
- Male holotype

Scientific classification
- Kingdom: Animalia
- Phylum: Arthropoda
- Class: Insecta
- Order: Lepidoptera
- Family: Geometridae
- Genus: Austrocidaria
- Species: A. venustatis

Binomial name
- Austrocidaria venustatis (Salmon, 1946)

Synonyms
- Hydriomena venustatis Salmon, 1946; Euphyia venustatis (Salmon, 1946)

= Austrocidaria venustatis =

Species of moth endemic to New Zealand

Austrocidaria venustatis is a species of moth of the family Geometridae. It endemic to New Zealand and has been collected in Southland. Adults of this species are on the wing in December.

== Taxonomy ==
This species was first described by John Tenison Salmon in 1946 using a specimen collected at Lake Gunn in the Eglinton Valley in December, 1944. Salmon originally named the species Hydriomena venustatis. In 1950 George Hudson described and illustrated this species. In 1988 John S. Dugdale placed this species in the genus Austrocidaria. The male holotype is held at Te Papa.

== Description ==
Hudson described this species as follows:

The expansion of the wings is about 1 1/8 inches (30 mm.). Face yellowish, palpi black. Top of head and thorax with heavy clothing of mixed black, ochreous-green, and red-brown scales. Antennae with strong, broad serrations from about 1/5 beyond base to tips. Forewings rather elongate, with apical region somewhat diluted; termen slightly bowed and deeply scalloped; dull green, with numerous very wavy, somewhat confused, black transverse lines; a subapical patch of orange-brick-red; faint, very suffused patches of same colour extending to middle of wing and below disc, a wavy, ochreous-green subterminal line, a rather broad, brighter green terminal band and a terminal series of black crescentic markings; cilia dull pinkish, with blackish subterminal band and faint, irregular bards of black on tips of scallops. Hindwings ochreous, darker towards termen; dorsum with prominent wavy blackish lines becoming obsolete towards disc; termen deeply scalloped, with a conspicuous marginal series of fine, crescentic, black marks; cilia ochreous, tinged with pink, especially towards dorsum; many blackish scales in cilia tending to form bars at apices of the scallops. Abdomen ochreous with back and segmental divisions marked in back; two conspicuous anal tufts.

Hudson recognised that this species was visually similar to Austrocidaria similata but stated that it could be distinguished from that species based on its morphology.

== Distribution ==
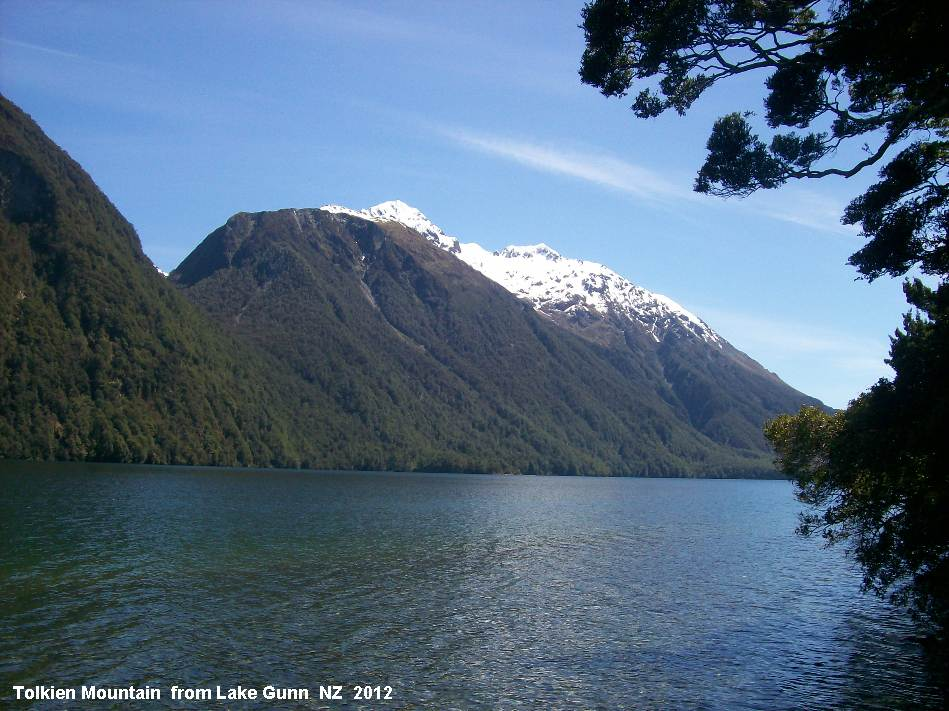
Lake Gunn, type locality for A. venustatis.

A. venustatis is endemic to New Zealand. It has been collected in Southland.

== Behaviour ==
Adults are on the wing in December.
