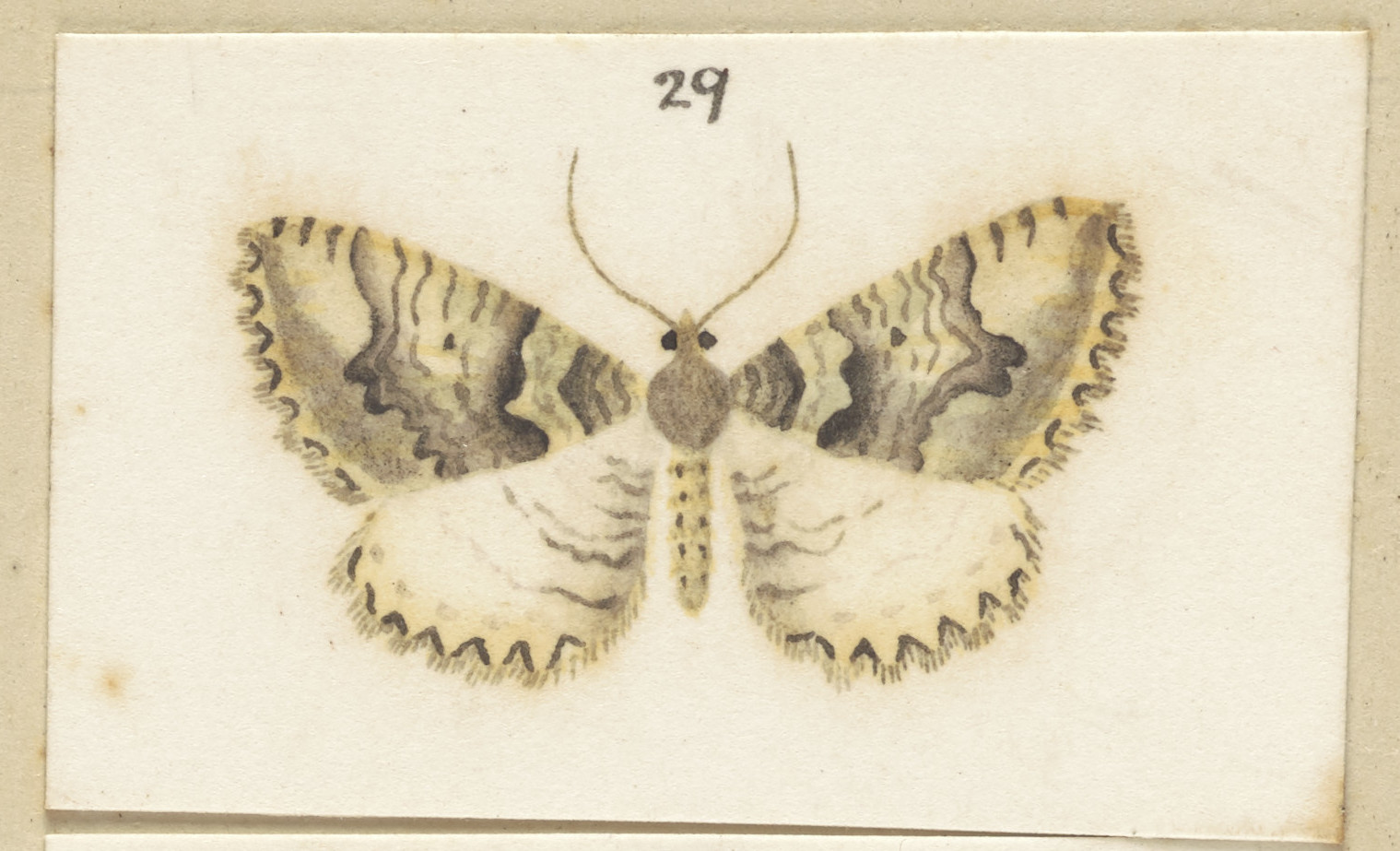
- Male
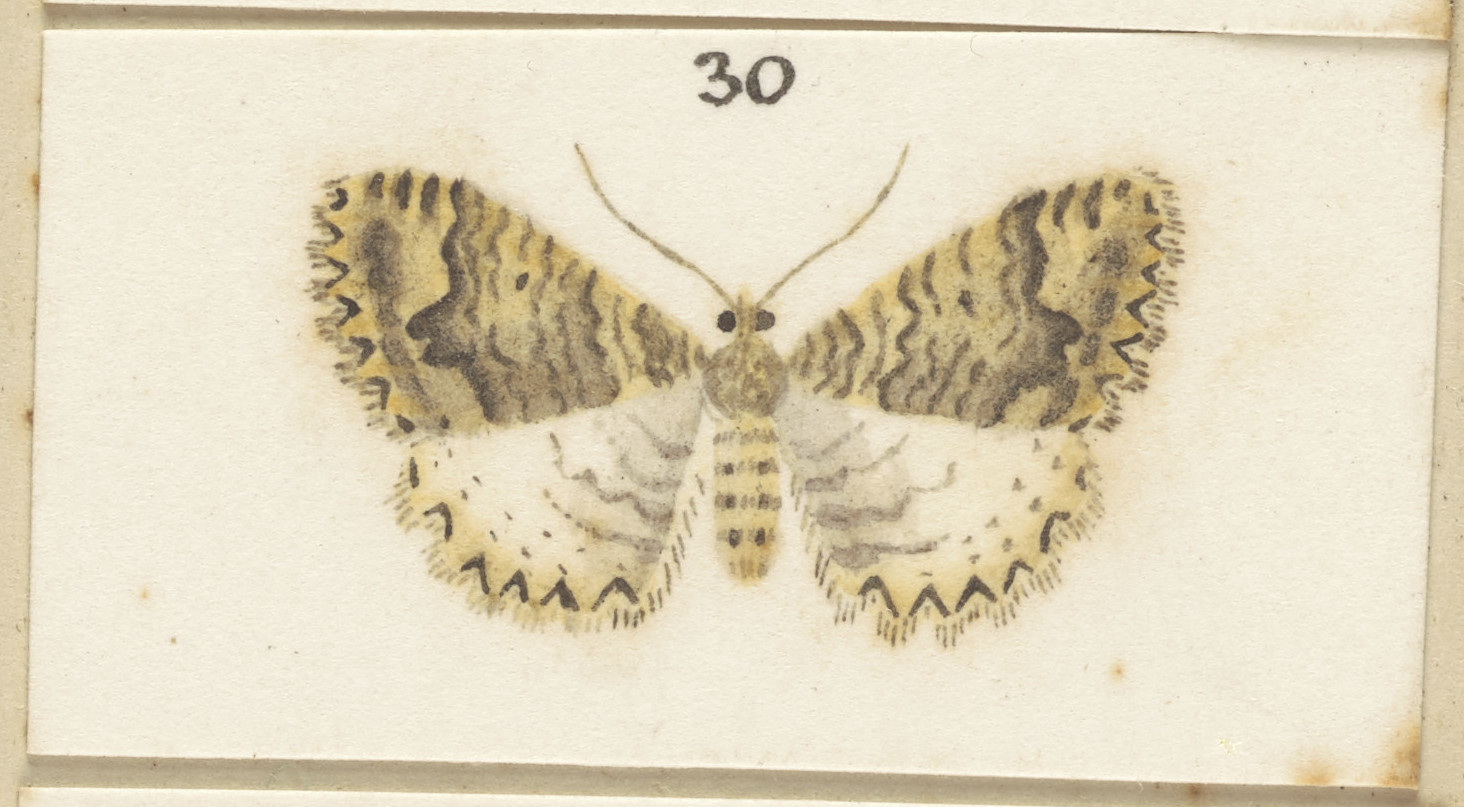
- Female

Conservation status
- Data Deficit (NZ TCS)

Scientific classification
- Kingdom: Animalia
- Phylum: Arthropoda
- Clade: Pancrustacea
- Class: Insecta
- Order: Lepidoptera
- Family: Geometridae
- Genus: Austrocidaria
- Species: A. prionota

Binomial name
- Austrocidaria prionota (Meyrick, 1883)

Synonyms
- Arsinoe prionota Meyrick, 1883; Anachloris prionota (Meyrick, 1883); Euphyia prionota (Meyrick, 1883); Hydriomena prionota (Meyrick, 1883)

= Austrocidaria prionota =

Species of moth

Austrocidaria prionota is a species of moth in the family Geometridae. This species was first described by Edward Meyrick in 1883. It is endemic to New Zealand. It is found in the South Island and is regarded as being uncommon. Larvae of this species have been recorded as feeding on Myrsine divaricata as well as on species of Coprosma. Adults are nocturnal and are attracted to light. In 2025 this species was classified as "data deficient" under the New Zealand Threat Classification System by the Department of Conservation.

== Taxonomy ==
This species was first described by Edward Meyrick in 1883 using specimens collected at Castle Hill and Dunedin, and given the name Arsinoe prionota. Meyrick described the species in more detail in 1884. In 1886 Meyrick recognised that the genus name he had used for this species had been used previously and renamed the species with the genus Anachloris. In 1917 Meyrick synonymised Anachloris with Hydriomena. George Hudson described and illustrated the species both in his 1898 book New Zealand Moths and Butterflies (Macro-lepidoptera) and in his 1928 book The Butterflies and Moths of New Zealand using the name Hydriomena prionota. In 1939 L. B. Prout discussed this species under the name Euphyia prionota. However 1971 J. S. Dugdale placed this species within the genus Austrocidaria. In that same publication Dugdale suggested that A. prionota may actually be the same species as Austrocidaria lithurgia. However in 1988 Dugdale reaffirmed this species placement within the genus Austrocidaria. The male lectotype specimen is held at the Canterbury Museum.

== Description ==
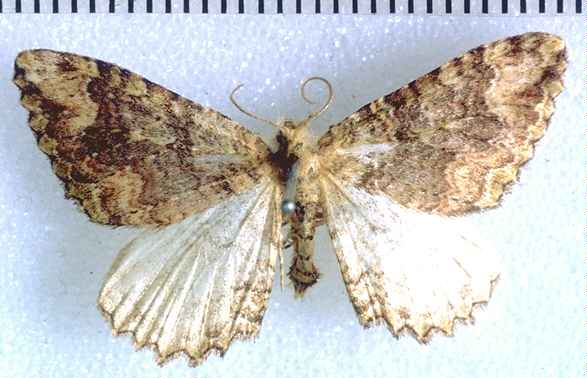
Male lectotype specimen.

Meyrick described the species as follows:

Male, female. — 27–31 mm. Forewings moderate, hindmargin rounded, in male crenate, in female dentate; light-ochreous; numerous indistinct sinuate dentate fuscous or dark fuscous striae; in male costa and hind- margin suffused with dull light green; a broad median band indistinctly suffused with dark fuscous, in female hardly perceptibly, the lines forming its posterior edge bent in middle into a rather strong indented projection; in male an indistinct dark fuscous subterminal suffusion; an indistinct dark fuscous discal dot. Hindwings moderate, hindmargin rounded, dentate; ochreous- whitish; some irregular incomplete dark fuscous lines towards inner margin; a dark fuscous hindmarginal line.

Hudson described the species as follows:

The expansion of the wings is rather under 1 1/2 inches. The forewings are dull yellowish-brown, with many obscure, wavy, transverse, brown lines, which tend to form two ill-defined bands, one rather narrow near the base and the other much broader near the middle of the wing. The hind-wings are very pale yellowish-brown; there are a few obscure dark lines near the dorsum. The veins are distinctly dotted in black, and the outline of all the wings is deeply scalloped.

A. prionota is likely variable in appearance. This species has been confused with Austrocidaria cedrinodes as the two species are similar in appearance. However they can be distinguished from each other as A. prionota has a complete lack of antennal pectinations.

== Distribution ==
This species is endemic to New Zealand, and occurs in the South Island. It has been collected at Gouland Downs in the Kahurangi National Park, as well as at Castle Hill in Christchurch and in Dunedin. It is regarded as not common and difficulty has been had sourcing specimens good enough for the addition of this species into a photographic database.

== Biology and behaviour ==
The larvae of A. prionota have been recorded feeding on Myrsine divaricata as well as on species of Coprosma. This species is on wing in January and October. The adult moth is regarded as being a medium flyer with the ability to remain active in light breezes. Adult moths are nocturnal and are attracted to light and have been collected via Robinson light trapping.

== Conservation status ==
In 2025 this species was classified by the New Zealand Department of Conservation as "data deficient" under the New Zealand Threat Classification System as a result of the difficulty in identifying the species.
