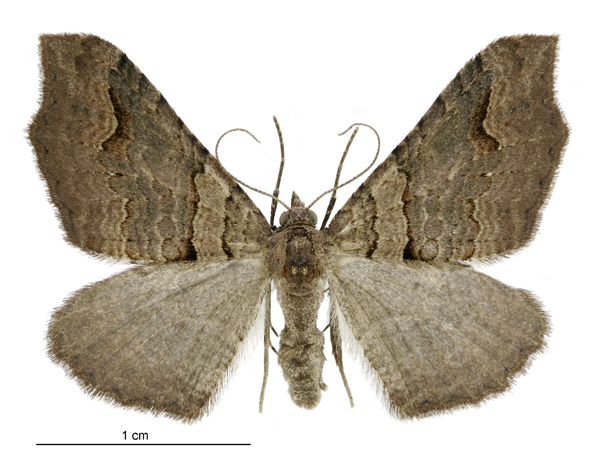
- Female
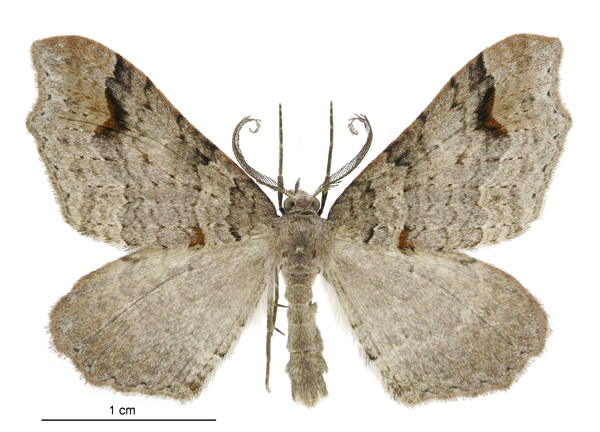
- Male

Scientific classification
- Kingdom: Animalia
- Phylum: Arthropoda
- Clade: Pancrustacea
- Class: Insecta
- Order: Lepidoptera
- Family: Geometridae
- Genus: Austrocidaria
- Species: A. parora

Binomial name
- Austrocidaria parora (Meyrick, 1884)

Synonyms
- Harpalyce parora Meyrick, 1884; Probolaea parora (Meyrick, 1884); Asaphodes parora (Myrick, 1884)

= Austrocidaria parora =

Species of moth

Austrocidaria parora is a species of moth of the family Geometridae. It is endemic to New Zealand.

== Taxonomy ==
This species was described by Edward Meyrick in 1884 as Harpalyce parora. In 1886 Meyrick recognised that the genus name he had used for this species had been used previously and renamed the genus in which he placed this species as Probolaea. In 1898 George Hudson placed this species within the Asaphodes genus. In 1906 George Howes, discussing the species under the name Asaphodes parora, also illustrated it. In 1928 Hudson discussed and illustrated the species again under the name Asaphodes parora. In 1988 J. S. Dugdale placed this species within the genus Austrocidaria.

The lectotype specimen is held at the Natural History Museum, London.

== Description ==
Hudson described this species in 1898 as follows:

Male, female. — 29-34 mm. (about 1 1/4 inches) . Fore-wings moderate, apex acute, termen excavated on upper half, acutely projecting in middle; varying from light grey to light reddish-fuscous; about eighteen irregular dentate darker striae, sometimes partially obsolete; first three, seventh and eighth, and eleventh to thirteenth usually more distinct and blackish; seventh and eighth closely approximated, forming a small blackish or reddish spot on dorsum, sometimes partially suffused with blackish; eleventh to thirteenth closely approximated, widely remote from eighth, parallel to termen; a blackish discal dot; sometimes a broad purplish-grey median band; sixteenth sometimes spotted with blackish towards costa; a terminal row of blackish dots. Hind-wings moderate, upper angle broadly projecting, termen shortly projecting in middle; varying from whitish-grey to very pale reddish- fuscous, faintly striated with darker.

It is regarded as being variable in colour.

== Distribution ==
Austrocidaria parora is endemic to New Zealand. The lectotype specimen was collected at Riccarton Bush in Christchurch. This species has also been collected at Mount Ruapehu, Whanganui, Lake Horowhenua, Wellington, Greymouth, Mount Hutt, Central Otago, and Invercargill.

== Behaviour and biology ==
Adults have been recorded as being on wing in January and February as well as in August and September. The larvae feed on Coprosma species.
