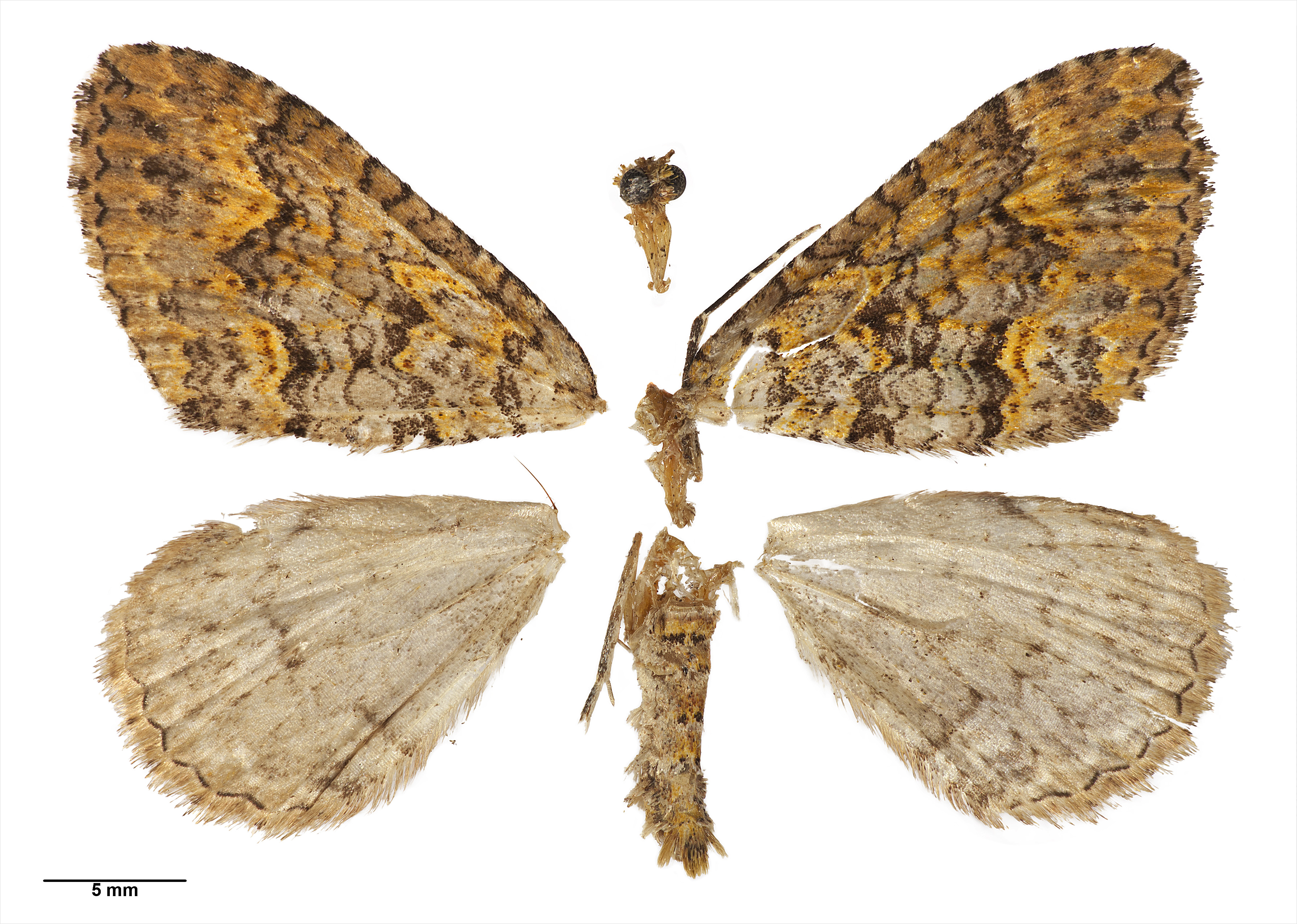
- Male holotype specimen of Austrocidaria callichlora

Scientific classification
- Kingdom: Animalia
- Phylum: Arthropoda
- Clade: Pancrustacea
- Class: Insecta
- Order: Lepidoptera
- Family: Geometridae
- Subfamily: Larentiinae
- Tribe: Xanthorhoini
- Genus: Austrocidaria; Dugdale, 1971

= Austrocidaria =

Genus of moths

Austrocidaria is a genus of moths in the family Geometridae. It was described by John S. Dugdale in 1971.

All but one of the species are endemic to New Zealand. The exception is the Australian endemic Austrocidaria erasta, which is found in Tasmania and southern Victoria.

== Selected species ==
- Austrocidaria anguligera (Butler, 1879)
- Austrocidaria arenosa (Howes, 1911)
- Austrocidaria bipartita (Prout, 1958)
- Austrocidaria callichlora (Butler, 1879)
- Austrocidaria cedrinodes (Meyrick, 1911)
- Austrocidaria erasta (Turner, 1939)
- Austrocidaria gobiata (Felder & Rogenhofer, 1875)
- Austrocidaria haemophaea (Meyrick, 1925)
- Austrocidaria lithurga (Meyrick, 1911)
- Austrocidaria parora (Meyrick, 1884)
- Austrocidaria praerupta (Philpott, 1918)
- Austrocidaria prionota (Meyrick, 1883)
- Austrocidaria similata (Walker 1862)
- Austrocidaria stricta (Philpott, 1915)
- Austrocidaria umbrosa (Philpott, 1917)
- Austrocidaria venustatis (Salmon, 1946)
