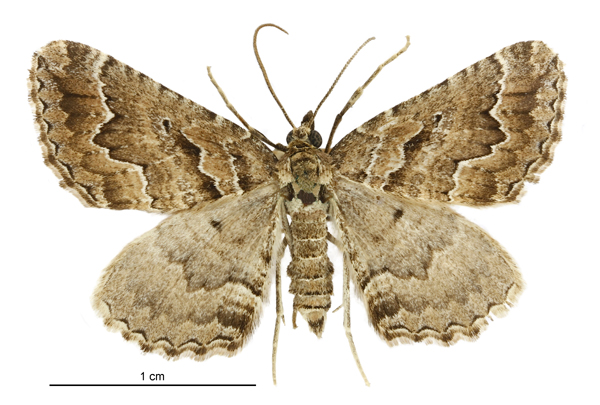
- Male
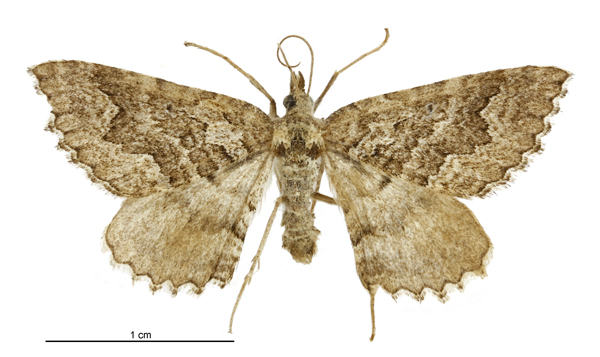
- Female

Scientific classification
- Kingdom: Animalia
- Phylum: Arthropoda
- Class: Insecta
- Order: Lepidoptera
- Family: Geometridae
- Genus: Austrocidaria
- Species: A. lithurga

Binomial name
- Austrocidaria lithurga (Meyrick, 1911)

Synonyms
- Hydriomena lithurga Meyrick, 1911

= Austrocidaria lithurga =

Species of moth

Austrocidaria lithurga is a species of moth in the family Geometridae. It is endemic to New Zealand. This moth is classified as at risk, naturally uncommon by the Department of Conservation.

== Taxonomy ==
This species was first described by Edward Meyrick in 1911 and named Hydriomena lithurga. Meyrick used a specimen obtained from R. M. Sunley who had collected a pupa from a Muehlenbeckia plant at Mākara Beach, Wellington, in November and had raised the adult in captivity. George Hudson described and illustrated the species in his 1928 book The Butterflies and Moths of New Zealand. In 1971 John S. Dugdale assigned H. lithurga to the genus Austrocidaria. Dugdale postulated that A. lithurga might prove synonymous with Austrocidaria prionota.

The holotype specimen is held at the Natural History Museum, London.

== Description ==
Meyrick originally described this species as follows:

♂︎. 25 mm. Head and thorax pale greyish-ochreous mixed with whitish, transversely barred with blackish-grey suffusion. Palpi 1 1/2, blackish-grey, lower longitudinal half whitish. Antennae somewhat stout, shortly ciliated (1/3). Abdomen pale greyish-ochreous, mixed on sides with dark grey and whitish, segmental margins white preceded by a black mark on each side of back. Forewings triangular, costa rather strongly arched towards apex, apex obtuse, termen rather obliquely rounded, crenate; pale greyish-ochreous, marked with indistinct waved striae of grey irroration becoming blackish on costa; margin of a small basal patch indicated on lower half by a blackish stria edged with white posteriorly; median band formed by two fasciae of several rather irregular suffused grey striae each, well marked except beneath costa, margins marked with black edged exteriorly with white except near costa, anterior margin twice sinuate, posterior with median third forming a rather strong subtriangular obliquely bilobate prominence; a transverse-linear black slightly whitish-edged discal dot on anterior of these fasciae; subterminal line of ground-colour, slender, strongly waved, preceded by some grey suffusion towards dorsum and above middle, and cut by an oblique dark-grey streak from apex marked with blackish; a fine black terminal line: cilia whitish with two grey shades, with undefined dark-grey bars. Hindwings with termen rounded, crenate; grey- whitish, median band and subtei-minal line indicated by faint grey striae obsolete towards costa; a blackish-grey linear discal dot; cilia as in forewings, but dark markings nearly obsolete round apex.

== Distribution ==
This species is endemic to New Zealand. This species range is Wellington and Mid Canterbury. As well as the type locality, this species is recorded as having been collected at Sinclair Head and at Baring Head, both in Wellington. It has also been located in south Marlborough. It is possible that the species is also present at Little Bush, Puketitiri, in the Hawkes Bay.

== Biology and life cycle ==
The pupa of this species is attached to a loose cocoon. The adult moth is on the wing in October and November.

== Host species and habitat ==
Hudson hypothesised that the host plants of the larvae of this moth are Muehlenbeckia species and it has also been suggested that the host plants are divaricating small-leaved Coprosma species. However the precise host species for this moth is unknown as is its preferred habitat but it has been hypothesised that A. tithurga prefers open shrub-land.

== Conservation status ==
This moth is classified under the New Zealand Threat Classification System as being at risk, naturally uncommon.
