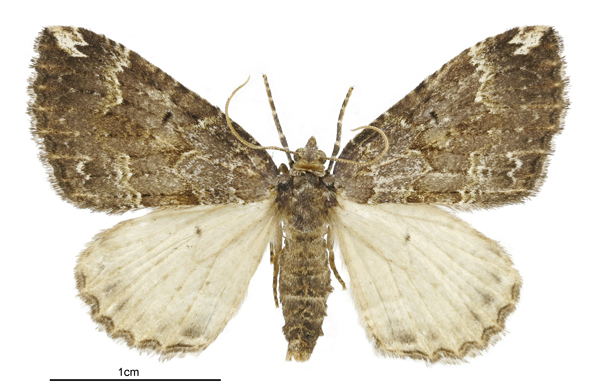
- Female
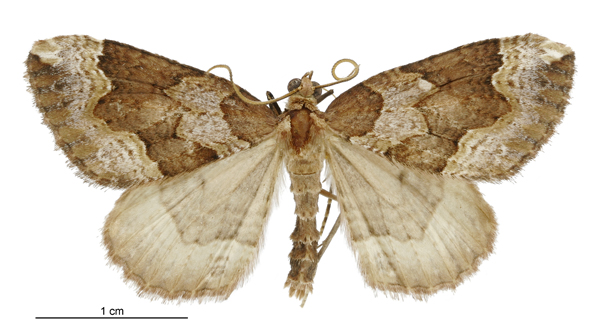
- Male

Scientific classification
- Kingdom: Animalia
- Phylum: Arthropoda
- Clade: Pancrustacea
- Class: Insecta
- Order: Lepidoptera
- Family: Geometridae
- Genus: Austrocidaria
- Species: A. haemophaea

Binomial name
- Austrocidaria haemophaea (Meyrick, 1925)

Synonyms
- Hydriomena haemophaea Meyrick, 1925; Euphyia haemophaea (Meyrick, 1925)

= Austrocidaria haemophaea =

Species of moth endemic to New Zealand

Austrocidaria haemophaea is a species of moth of the family Geometridae. It endemic to New Zealand and is found on the Chatham Islands. Adults are on the wing in December and June.

== Taxonomy ==
This species was first described by Edward Meyrick in 1925 and originally named Hydriomena haemophaea. George Hudson discussed and illustrated this species under that name in his 1928 book The butterflies and moths of New Zealand. Louis Beethoven Prout discussed this species under the name Euphyia haemophaea. In 1971 John S. Dugdale placed this species in the genus Austrocidaria. The male holotype, collected at Whangamarino on Chatham Island by Stewart Lindsay, is held at the Canterbury Museum.

== Description ==
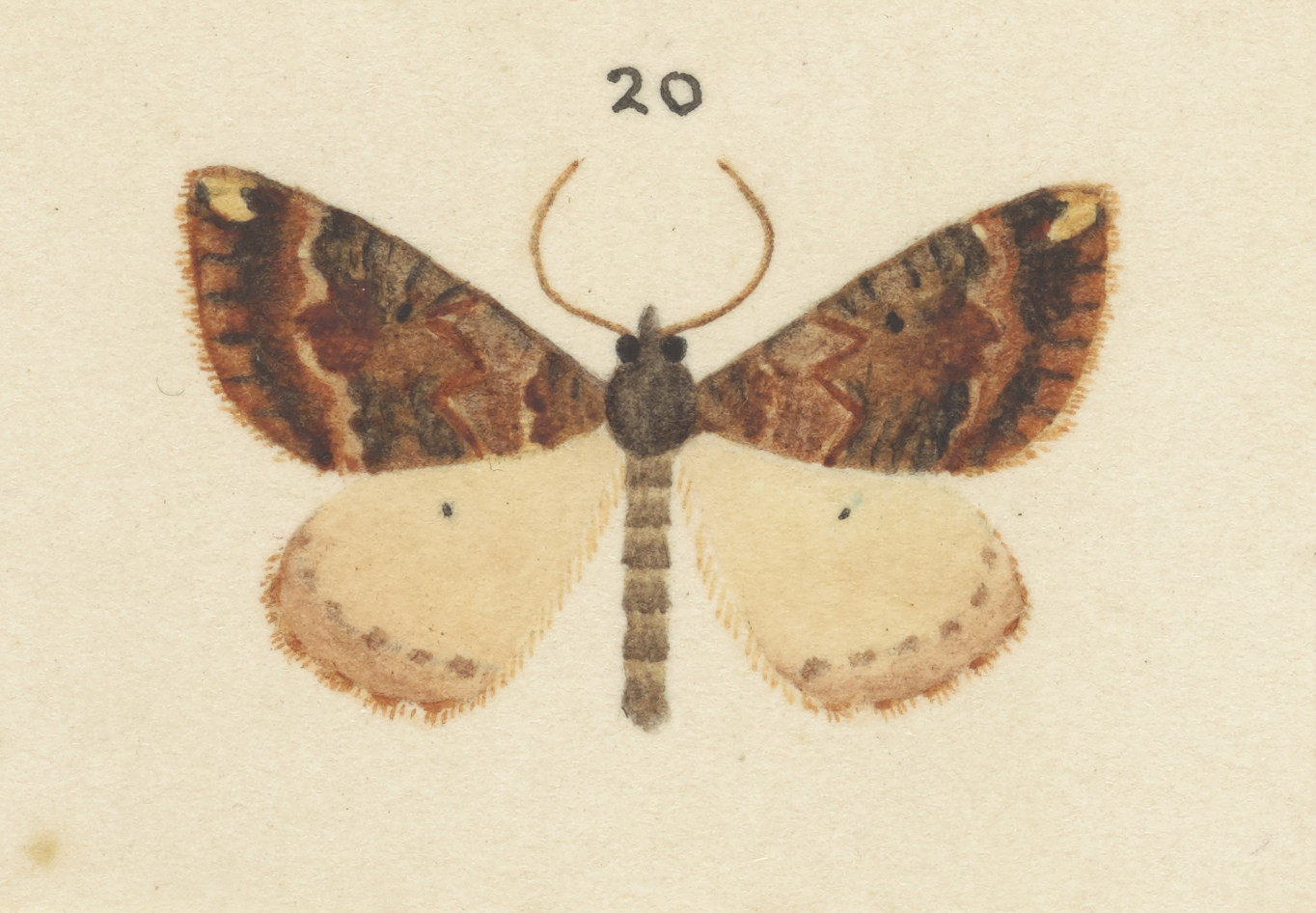
Hudson's illustration.

Meyrick described the adult of this species as follows:

♂ 34 mm. Head, palpi, thorax light reddish-ochreous. Forewings with termen hardly bowed, little oblique, slightly waved; reddish-ochreous; a basal patch of grey curved transverse striation, edge obtusely angulated in middle, edged by an ochreous-whitish stria; space between this and median band suffused light greyish; median band suffused grey, with darker grey striae, broad on costa, and becoming narrower downwards, edged by reddish-ochreous striae, anterior with acute angulations outwards above and below middle and inwards in middle, posterior partly marked white, rather irregularly waved, with short broad obtuse double prominence in middle; discal mark small, blackish, transverse; a subterminal fascia of grey suffusion connected with termen by suffused dark grey bars; an irregular white costal spot just before apex, tinged reddish on costa (cilia imperfect). Hind wings ochreous grey-whitish, towards termen slightly reddish-tinged; a dark grey discal dot; a subterminal series of faint cloudy greyish spots; cilia reddish-whitish.

== Distribution ==
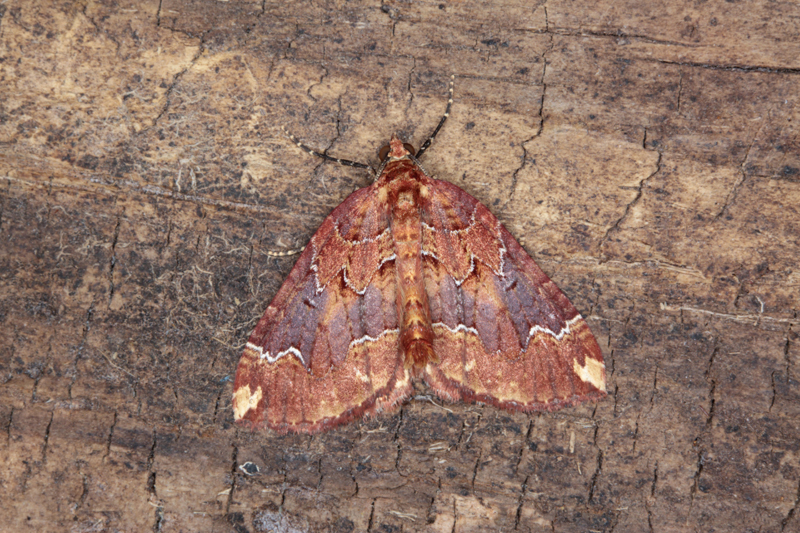
Adult at rest.

A. haemophaea is endemic to New Zealand. It has been observed on the Chatham Islands including on Chatham Island and Pitt Island.

== Hosts ==
As at 1971 the larval host of this species is unknown.

== Behaviour ==
The adults of this species are on the wing in December and June.
