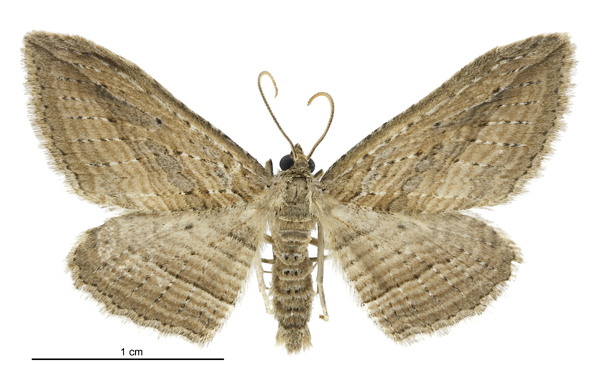
- Male
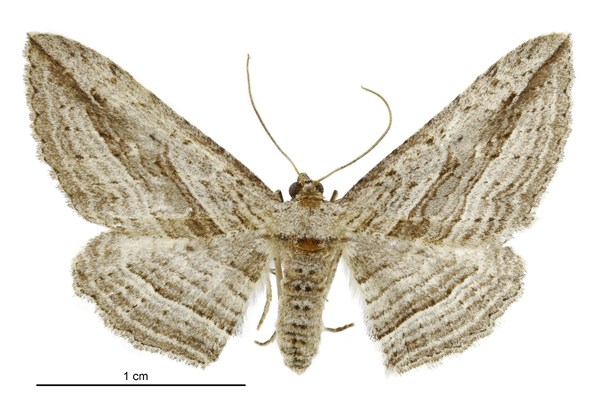
- Female

Scientific classification
- Kingdom: Animalia
- Phylum: Arthropoda
- Class: Insecta
- Order: Lepidoptera
- Family: Geometridae
- Genus: Austrocidaria
- Species: A. arenosa

Binomial name
- Austrocidaria arenosa (Howes, 1911)

Synonyms
- Eucymatoge arenosus Howes, 1911; Eucymatoge arenosa (Howes, 1911)

= Austrocidaria arenosa =

Species of moth

Austrocidaria arenosa is a species of moth in the family Geometridae. It is endemic to New Zealand. This moth is classified as "At Risk, Declining" by the Department of Conservation.

== Taxonomy ==
This species was first described by George Howes in 1911 using specimens collected at Mr O'Connors house at Tītahi Bay, Porirua and given the name Eucymatoge arenosus. George Vernon Hudson discussed and illustrated this species in his 1928 publication. Hudson changed its epithet to arenosa. In 1988 John S. Dugdale discussed this change and assigned the species to a new genus Austrocidaria. The holotype specimen is held at the Natural History Museum, London.

== Description ==
Howes described the adult moths of the species as follows:

Male and female, 26 lines. Head and thorax whitish-ochre, slightly touched with grey. Abdomen whitish-ochre with black bar interrupted in centre on apex of all segments. All wings whitish-ochreous, crossed by waved darker striae. A slight darker suffusion from apex towards centre of forewing. Cilia greyish-white, with a darker-grey line at base. A series of minute black marks along veins and around termen.

== Distribution ==
This species is endemic to New Zealand. As well as the type locality of Titahi Bay, A. arenosa has also been recorded as occurring at Moeraki near Oamaru, at Paekākāriki, and near Cass.

== Biology and life cycle ==
This species is attracted to blossoms, sugar and light. Adult moths are on the wing between November and March.

== Conservation status ==
This moth is classified under the New Zealand Threat Classification system as being "At Risk, Declining".
