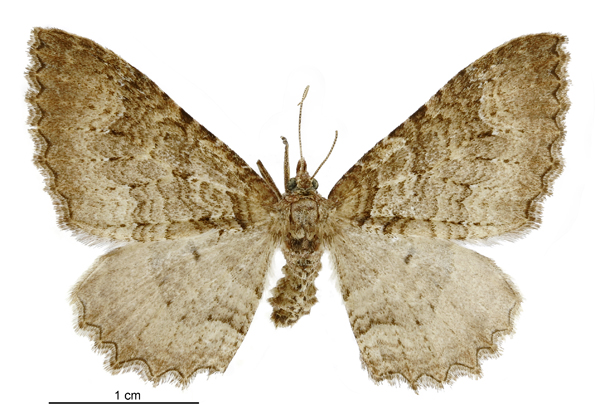
- Female
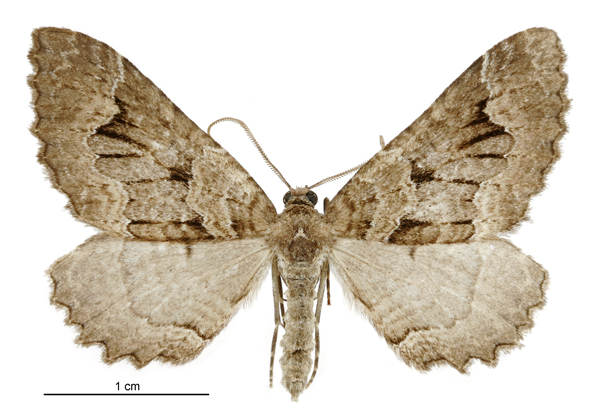
- Male

Scientific classification
- Domain: Eukaryota
- Kingdom: Animalia
- Phylum: Arthropoda
- Class: Insecta
- Order: Lepidoptera
- Family: Geometridae
- Genus: Austrocidaria
- Species: A. cedrinodes

Binomial name
- Austrocidaria cedrinodes (Meyrick, 1911

Synonyms
- Xanthorhoe cedrinodes Meyrick, 1911; Xanthorhoe sedrinodes (Meyrick, 1911) misspelling; Xanthorhoe undulata Philpott, 1913

= Austrocidaria cedrinodes =

Species of moth endemic to New Zealand

Austrocidaria cedrinodes is a species of moth of the family Geometridae. It was first described by Edward Meyrick in 1911. This species is endemic to New Zealand and has been observed in the North, South and Stewart Islands. Although widespread across the country A. cedrinodes is regarded as being a scarce species. It inhabits open native scrubland populated with species of Leptospermum, Dracophyllum as well as species in the genus Coprosma. This latter genus contains the larval host plants of A. cedrinodes. Adults are on the wing commonly from September until February and are nocturnal and attracted to light.

== Taxonomy ==
This species was first described by Edward Meyrick in 1911 using two specimens collected at 4200 ft on the Mount Arthur tableland at night on Hebe blossoms by George Hudson. Meyrick originally named the species Xanthorhoe cedrinodes. In 1913 Alfred Philpott, thinking he was describing a new species, named this species Xanthorhoe undulata. This name was synonymised by Meyrick in 1917. In 1928 George Hudson discussed and illustrated this species in his 1928 book The butterflies and moths of New Zealand under the name Xanthorhoe cedrinodes. In 1939 Louis Beethoven Prout discussed this species under the name Xanthorhoe episema. John S. Dugdale placed this species in the genus Austrocidaria and at the same synonymised X. episema with that name. The male lectotype is held at the Natural History Museum, London.

== Description ==
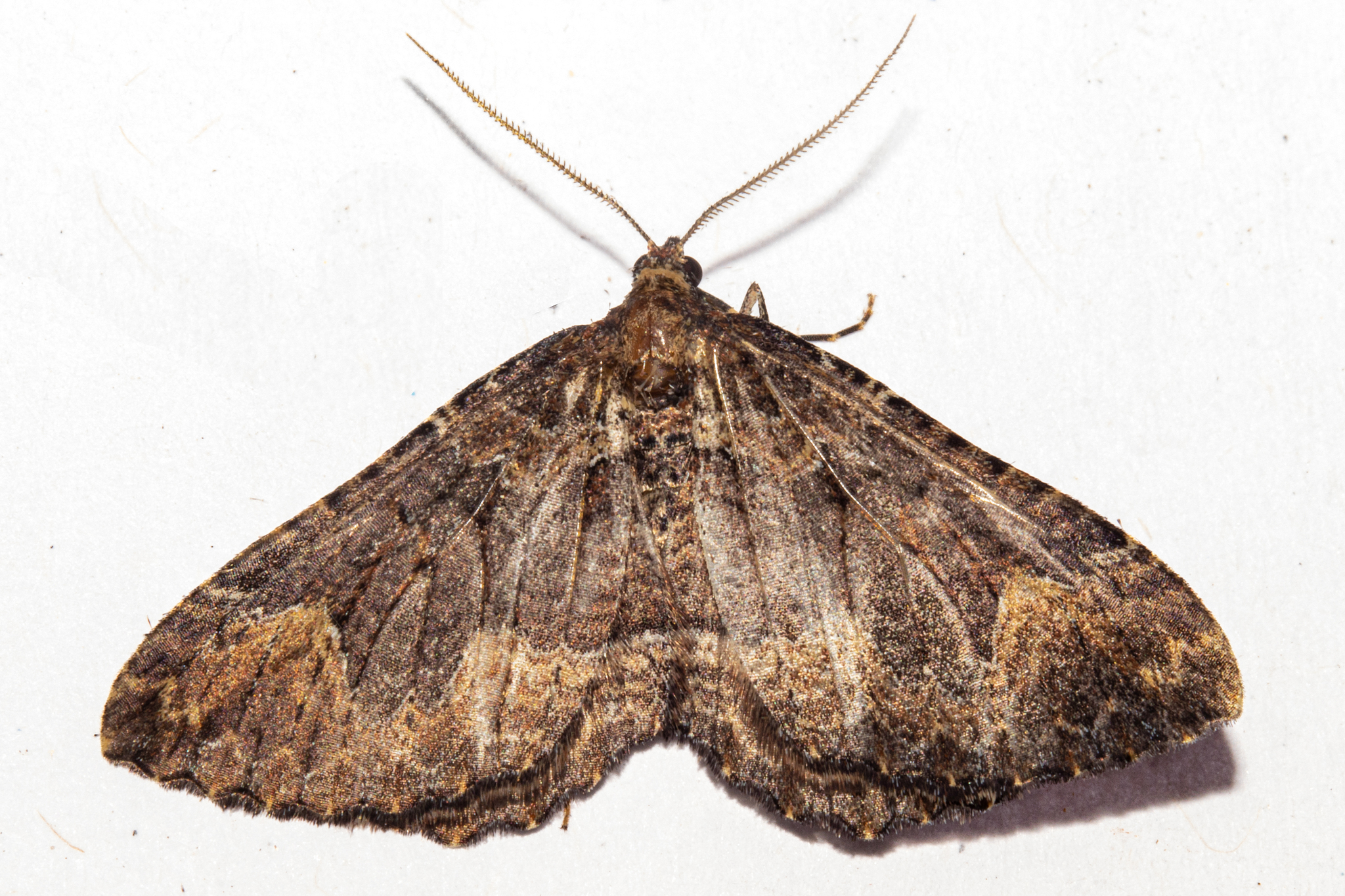
Male A. cedrinodes showing antennae pectinations.

Meyrick described this species as follows:

♂♀. 40 mm. Head and thorax dark grey mixed with brown-reddish. Antennal pectinations in ♂ a 2, b 1 1/2. Abdomen grey. Forewings triangular, costa moderately arched towards apex, apex obtuse, termen waved, slightly rounded, rather oblique; reddish-fuscous, more or less sprinkled with black, tending to form curved waved transverse striae; costa marked irregularly with black; a curved band of several pale whitish-ochreous striae separating basal patch and median band, former edged with blackish and both slightly with white; median band broad, variably marked with black on edges and veins, middle third of posterior edge forming a moderate obtuse double prominence, partially finely edged with white posteriorly; beyond this a band of two or three cloudy pale whitish-ochreous striae, veins on this marked with black; subterminal line slender, waved, indistinct, pale whitish-ochreous; a black terminal line marked with ochreous-whitish dots on veins : cilia dark fuscous mixed with brown-reddish and whitish. Hindwings with termen somewhat rounded, crenate; pale rosy- greyish-ochreous, with traces of faint grey striae; posterior edge of median band more marked, angulated in middle, blackish-sprinkled towards dorsum; some reddish-fuscous suffusion along termen; a black terminal line : cilia reddish-fuscous mixed with ochreous-whitish and dark grey.

Hudson pointed out that both the males and females of this species vary in the intensity of their markings and colouring. This species has been confused with A. prionota however it can be distinguished as A. cedrinodes is of a larger size and the male of the species has pectinated antennae. It has also been confused with Hydriomena hemizona but again can be distinguished as a result of the antennae pectinations on the male A. cedrinodes.

== Distribution ==
This species is endemic to New Zealand. Other than its type locality, A. cedrinodes has also been observed around Mount Ruapehu as well as other areas in the central North Island, throughout the South Island including in Otago, Southland and on Stewart Island. This species is regarded as being widespread but sparse.

== Habitat and hosts ==
This species inhabits open scrubland and is commonly found in habitat containing Leptospermum and Dracophyllum species as well as species in the genus Coprosma. A. cedrinodes has also been observed as having an affinity for stands of Olearia colensoi. The larval host plants of A. cedrinodes are within the genus Coprosma.

== Behaviour ==
Adults of this species are on the wing in September until February and are nocturnal. Adults are attracted to light.
