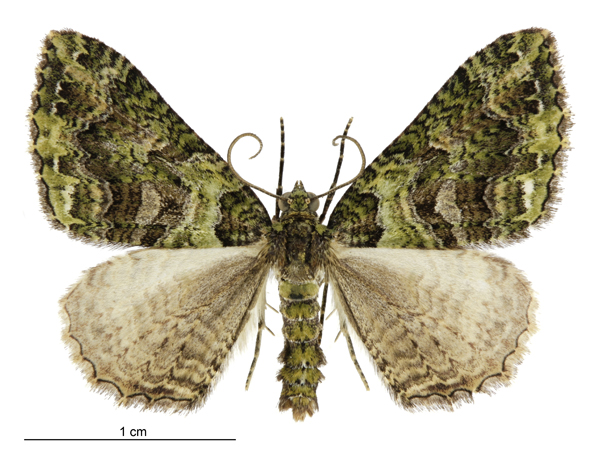
- Male
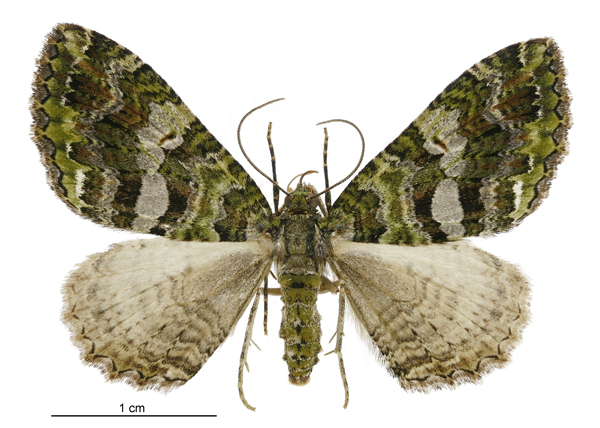
- Female

Scientific classification
- Kingdom: Animalia
- Phylum: Arthropoda
- Clade: Pancrustacea
- Class: Insecta
- Order: Lepidoptera
- Family: Geometridae
- Genus: Austrocidaria
- Species: A. similata

Binomial name
- Austrocidaria similata (Walker 1862)

Synonyms
- Cidaria similata Walker, 1862; Cidaria timarata Felder & Rogenhofer, 1875; Euphyia similata (Walker, 1862); Euphyia nigrofasciata Prout, 1939; Hydriomena similata (Walker, 1862)

= Austrocidaria similata =

Species of moth endemic to New Zealand

Austrocidaria similata is a species of moth of the family Geometridae. It is endemic to New Zealand and is found throughout the country, including offshore and subantarctic islands. It inhabits native forest and shrubland.

The white, oval eggs take about three weeks to mature. Larvae feed on Coprosma plants and mimic the appearance of a moss-covered twig. It has been hypothesised that the species overwinters as larvae. The larvae pupate on the ground, with the pupa being enclosed in a thin cocoon made up of silk and refuse. Adults are on the wing all year but are most commonly observed from October until March. Adults are nocturnal and are attracted to light. During the day they can be observed resting on tree trunks, where their forewing colouration provides camouflage protection from predators.

== Taxonomy ==
The species was first described by Francis Walker in 1862 using a specimen obtained by William Colenso, collected either in Hawke's Bay or Taupō, and named Cidaria similata. In 1875 Felder and Rogenhofer named it Cidaria timarata, thinking they were describing a new species. This name was synonymised by Edward Meyrick in 1883. George Hudson discussed and illustrated the species in both his 1898 and 1928 publications under the name Hydriomena similata. In 1939 L. B. Prout discussed it under the name Euphyia nigrofasciata as an aberration of Eyphyia similata. John S. Dugdale synonymised this name with A. similata in his 1988 publication. In 1964 John S. Dugdale, following Hudson, used the name Hydriomena similata when discussing and illustrating this species. In 1971 Dugdale subsequently placed this species within the genus Austrocidaria. The male holotype specimen is held at the Natural History Museum, London.

== Description ==
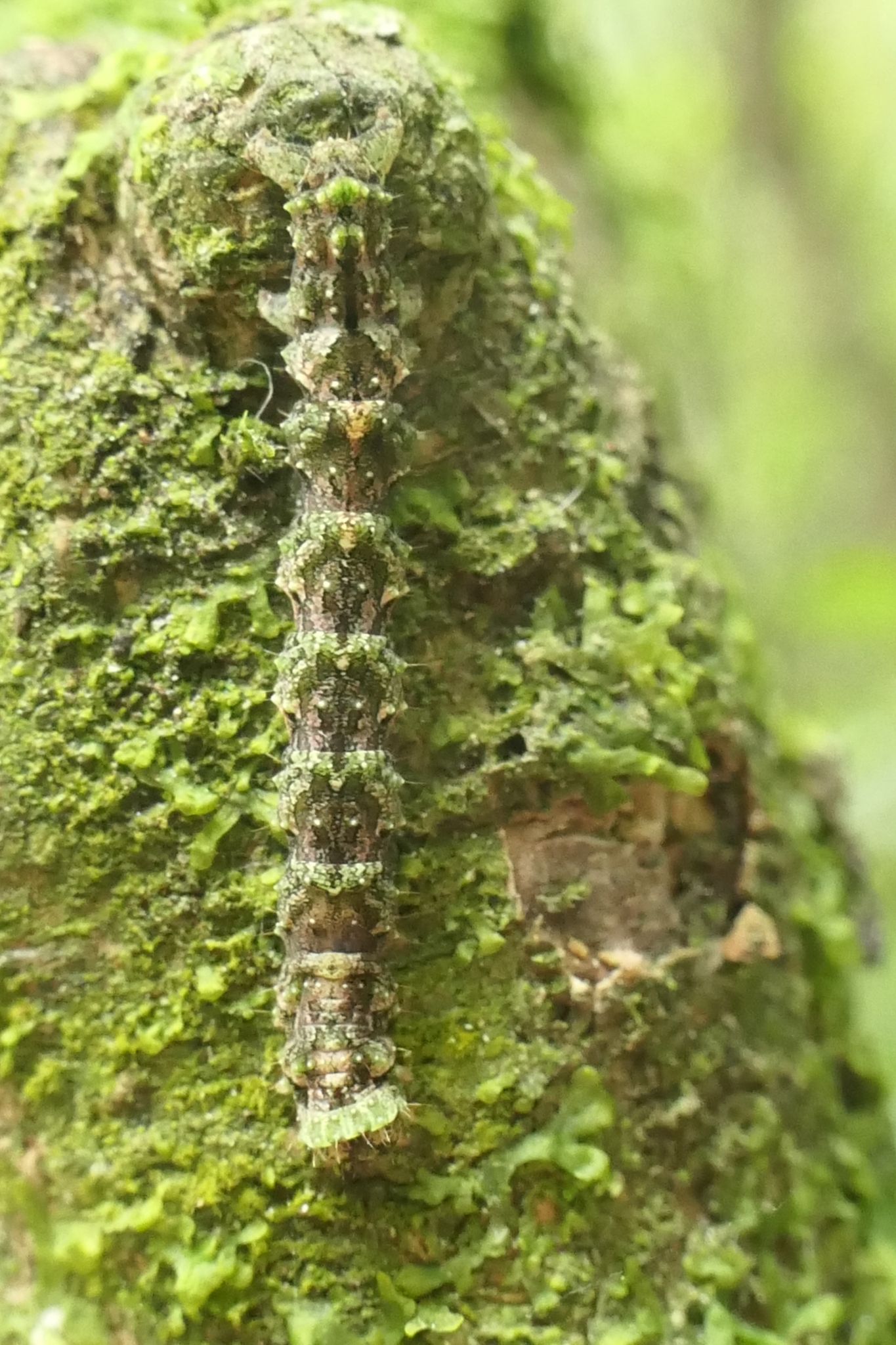
A. similata larva.

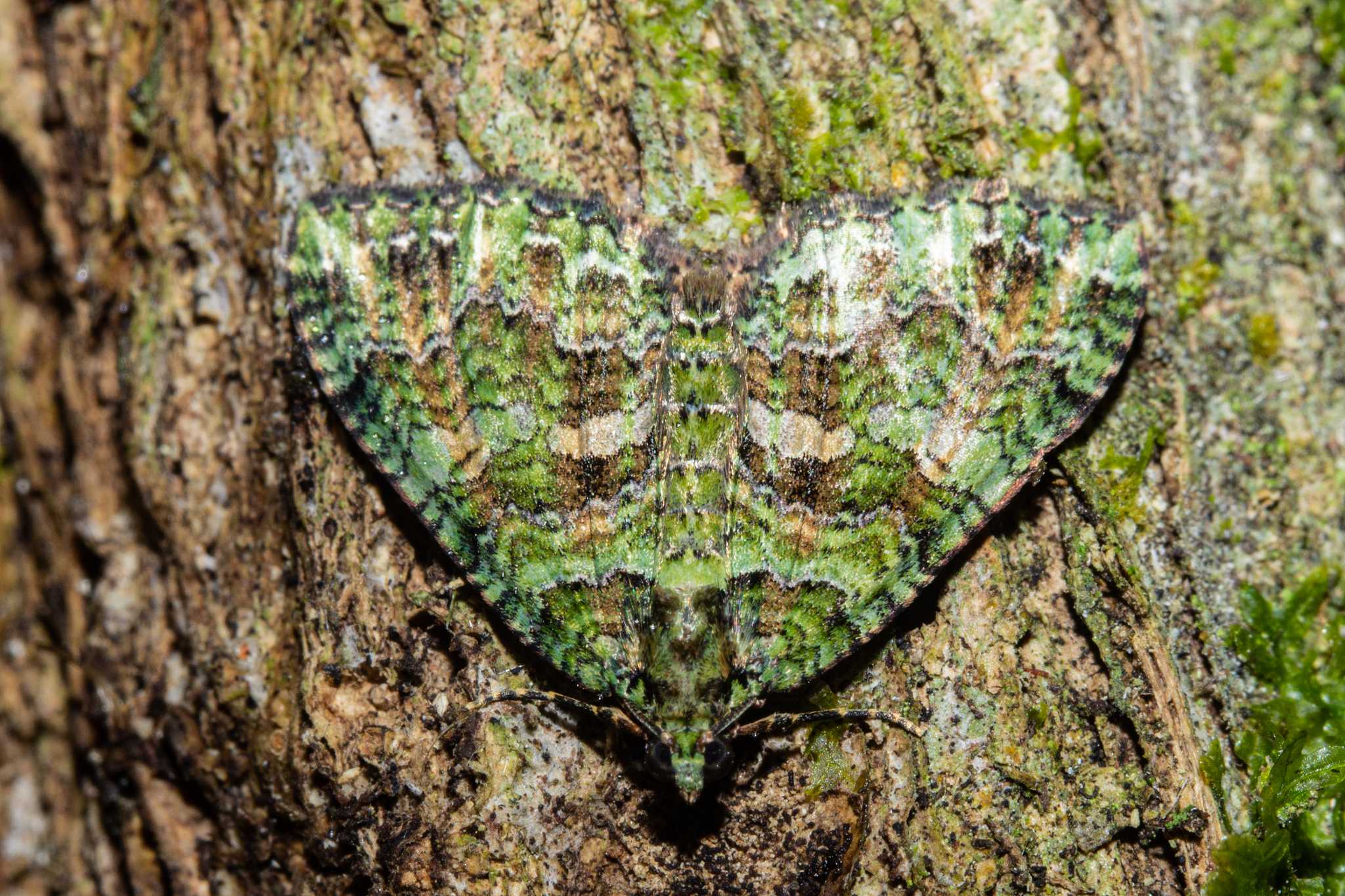
A. similata resting on a tree trunk.

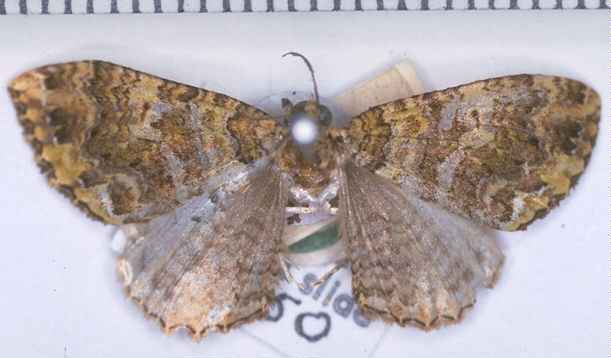
Male holotype specimen of A. similata.

The eggs of this species are coloured white and are oval in shape. They mature over the space of approximately three weeks.

Hudson described the larvae of this species as follows:

The larva, which feeds on Coprosma robusta and C. rotundifolia, is about 1 inch in length, rather stout, slightly attenuated at each end; dull brown thickly speckled and streaked with blackish; the central portions of the three thoracic segments are green as well as a series of prominent dorsal ridges situated on the posterior margins of the other segments; the spiracles are black margined with white and the legs and prolegs pale green. Younger larvae have the dorsal ridges much less conspicuous, and whitish tubercles are often situated on segments 7, 8, 9 and 10.

Hudson goes on to explain that the larvae resembles a small twig covered in moss thus making it hard to detect on its food plant. Hudson also believed that this species over winters in its larval state.

Hudson describes the pupa of this species as follows:

The pupa is enclosed in a thin cocoon, constructed of silk and refuse, situated on the surface of the ground.

Hudson also described the adults of this species as follows:

The expansion of the wings is 1 1/4 inches. The fore-wings are dark greyish-brown or purplish-brown, with the veins and margins broadly marked with bright green; there are numerous irregular wavy blackish streaks forming three very ill-defined darker transverse bands; the first at the base; the second from about one-fourth to two-thirds, usually with a paler central area; and the third near the termen outwardly edged with white. There is a series of fine black terminal marks and the cilia are dark brown. The hind-wings are cream-coloured tinged with very pale reddish-brown, darker towards the dorsum, with numerous pale brown wavy transverse lines. There is a series of black crescentic marks on the termen, and the cilia are pale reddish-brown.

This species is similar in appearance to A. callichlora but can be distinguished from that species as A. similata has a purple-grey coloured mark where the forewings meet. A. similata can also be distinguished from this species as it has two white oblong shaped white patches on the bottom of its forewings near its abdomen when the wings are at rest. Hudson states that it can commonly be observed resting on moss covered tree trunks and that its colouring provides camouflage protection against predators.

== Distribution ==
Austrocidaria similata is endemic to New Zealand. This species is found on the Auckland Islands, Campbell Island / Motu Ihupuku, Snares Islands, the Chatham Islands and mainland New Zealand, Stewart Island / Rakiura and Codfish Island / Whenua Hou.

== Habitat and hosts ==
This species inhabits native forest and shrubland where its larval host species can be found. The larvae feed on Coprosma species.

== Behaviour ==
Adults are on wing throughout the year but are most common in the months from October to March. The adults of this species are nocturnal and are attracted to light. They have been collected via a mercury vapour light trap.
