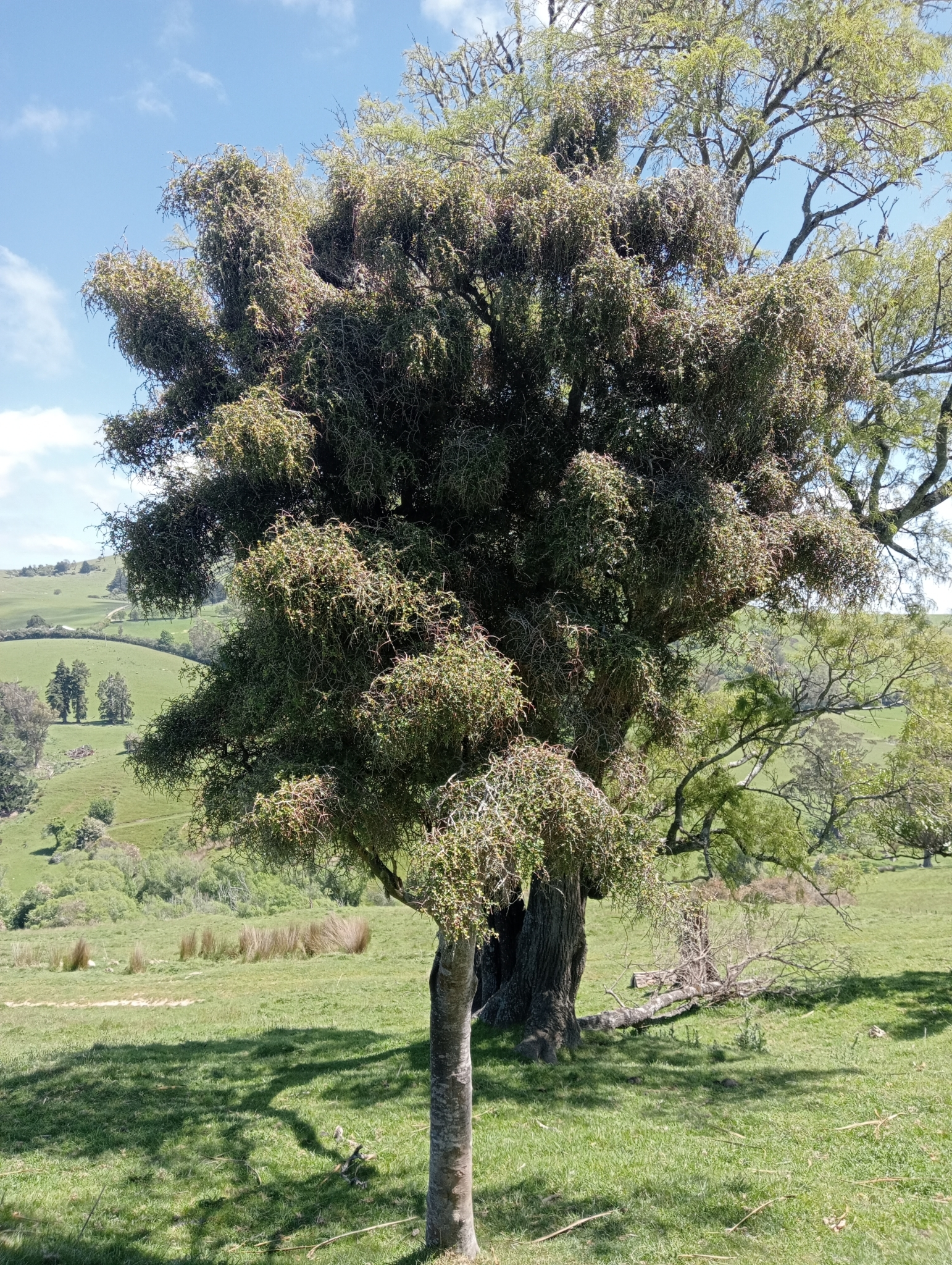
- A M. divaricata in Otago farmland

Conservation status
- Not Threatened (NZ TCS)

Scientific classification
- Kingdom: Plantae
- Clade: Tracheophytes
- Clade: Angiosperms
- Clade: Eudicots
- Clade: Asterids
- Order: Ericales
- Family: Primulaceae
- Genus: Myrsine
- Species: M. divaricata

Binomial name
- Myrsine divaricata A.Cunn.

= Myrsine divaricata =

Species of shrub

Myrsine divaricata also known as weeping māpou or weeping matipo, is a small tree up to 4 metres (13 ft) tall or often a shrub endemic to New Zealand. It has a strongly divaricating habit with interlaced branches. The woody parts are stiff and pubescent when young. The small leathery simple leaves are borne on short petioles and may be slightly two lobed at the end. The very small yellow or reddish flowers may be borne singly or in small groups which mature into small purple, occasionally white, fruit.

== Description ==
Myrsine divaricata is a shrub or small tree up to 4m with drooping/weeping and divaricating branchlets, giving this plant a straggly, twiggy and branched look.

Its leaves are small, being between 5–15 mm long by 5–10mm wide, and are on short petioles. They are simple, alternate or in fascicles, often broad-obovate or heart-shaped, and with a smooth margin. Leaves appear leathery, with oil glands dotted throughout. Commonly, there will also be a dark marking at the base of the leaf blade.

The trunk of M. divaricata is slim with rough, dark brown bark, which is often covered with lichen. The thin branchlets are divaricating, interlaced, spreading, and rigid. They also curve downwards, which gives them a drooping appearance.

The pale yellow to reddish flowers are also very small, being 2–3 mm in diameter with 3 or 4 petals. They are found singly, or in fascicles below the leaves.

Its fleshy fruit are often described as a drupe. They are small, 4–5 mm in diameter, and round. When ripe, fruits are a bright purple, but can also be mauve, or (rarely) white. Fruits contain one seed which are round and striped.

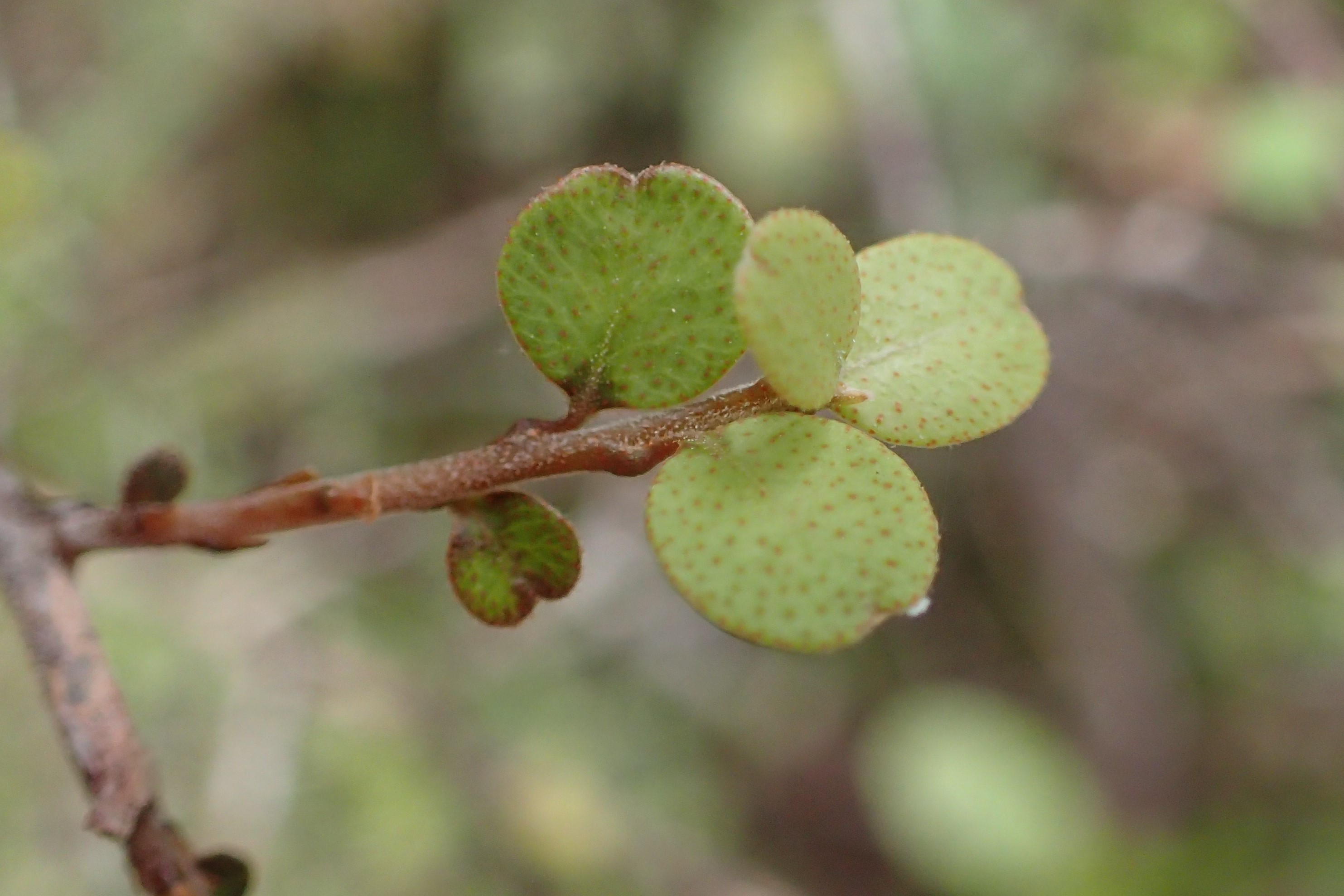
Leaves

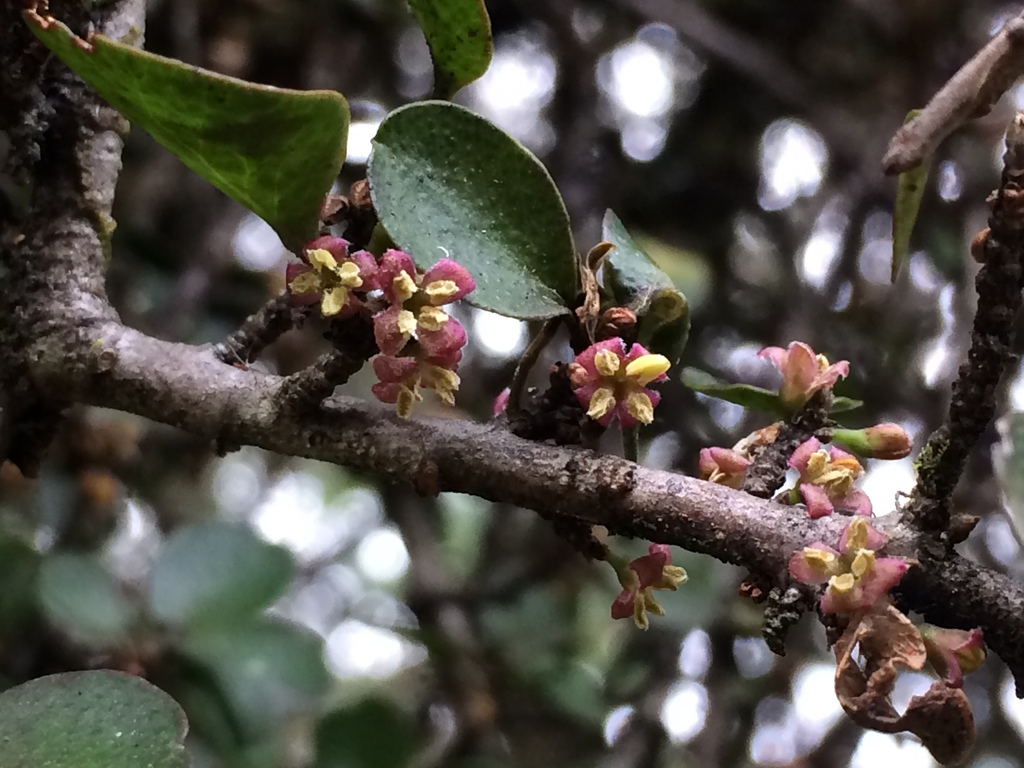
Flowers

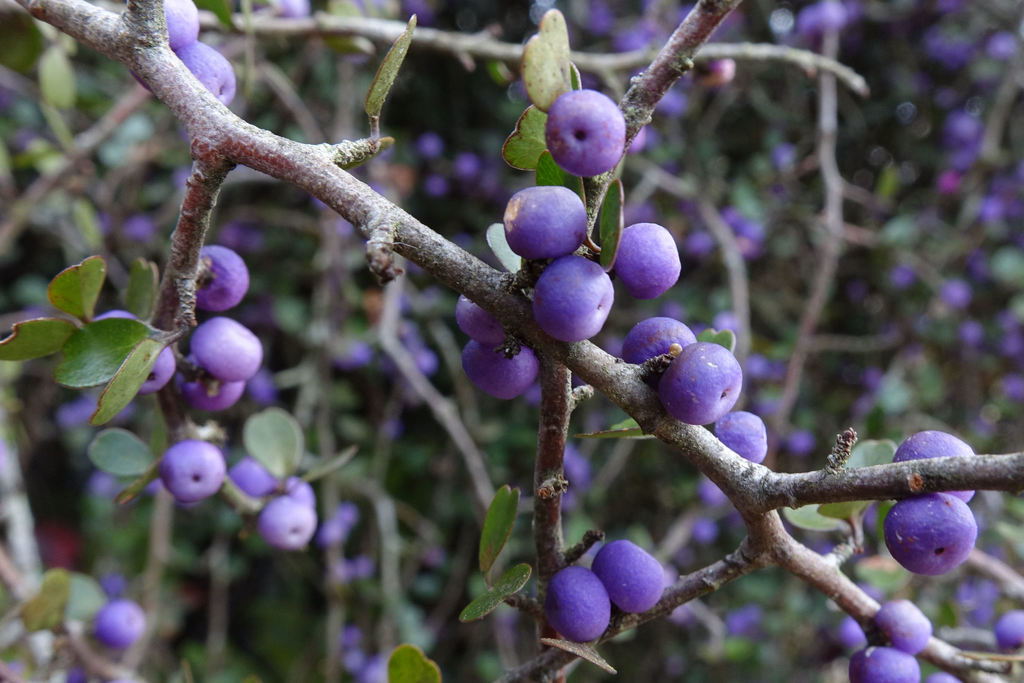
Fruit

== Range ==
=== Natural global range ===
Myrsine divaricata is endemic to New Zealand.

=== New Zealand range ===
Myrsine divaricata is common and widespread across New Zealand. It can be found in the North Island, South Island, Stewart Island, Auckland Islands, and Campbell Islands from lowland to higher montane environments or sea level to 1,200 m.

== Habitat ==
This species has been described as a generalist because it can be found in a wide range of habitats throughout New Zealand. However, it especially prefers high fertility sites.

From lowland to montane, it is known to occur in scrubland, inland basins, forests and on forest margins. With a cold sensitivity of −8.5°C, M. divaricata can be found in frost hollows, which are associated with severe frosts and poor drainage.

Myrsine divaricata occurs in many woody ecosystems including beech-broadleaved forest alliances, where M. divaricata is a subcanopy species in a silver beech-broadleaf dominated forest or beech forest alliances. In these ecosystems, M. divaricata is often used as an indicator species.

== Ecology ==
=== Phenology ===
Myrsine divaricata is evergreen and dioecious. Flowering occurs from June to November. A few months later, between August and April, these flowers will mature and fruiting will occur, producing purple fruits that ripen in the same timeframe. The flowers of M. divaricata are insect pollinated, and frugivorous birds disperse its seeds.

=== Predators, parasites, and diseases ===
Birds including New Zealand bellbirds and silvereyes, have been observed eating the fruits of M. divaricata. Other birds like riflemen, brown creepers, grey warblers, tomtits, and New Zealand fantails use M. divaricata to forage for other things, like invertebrates.

The extinct and flightless ratite, moa, are also believed to have predated M. divaricata. Moa gizzard content samples have revealed the leaves and seeds of M. divaricata, indicating that it was once part of the moa diet.

Invertebrates that are known to predate M. divaricata includes moths, beetles, flies, bees, true bugs and nematodes.

Species of moth use M. divaricata as a host plant by feeding on the plant's leaves or flowers as caterpillars. This has been specifically observed in the moth species, Declana floccosa, Apoctena flavescens, Gellonia pannularia, Pseudocoremia insignita, Pyrgotis plagiatana, and Pasiphila inductata.

Beetles can be found on M. divaricata, often living in dead parts of the plant, like branches, twigs, or bark. This includes Cacephatus aucklandicus, Ophryops dispar, Microcryptorhynchus latitarsis, Microcryptorhynchus multisetosus, Microcryptorhynchus suillus, Microcryptorhynchus kronei, Pachyderris punctiventris, Psepholax sulcatus, and Strongylopterus hylobioides.

Species of gall fly from the family Cecidomyiidae use M. divaricata as a host plant by inducing and living in galls on the plant as larvae.

Myrsine divaricata is regarded as good bee forage by farmers. Bee species that are native and introduced to New Zealand will use this plant for pollen and nectar.

True bugs have been found using M. divaricata as a host plant, specifically Toxoptera aurantii, Aneurus (Aneurodellus) zealandensis, Eriococcus setulosus, Umbonichiton hymenantherae Poliaspis media, Leucaspis gigas, and Rastrococcus namartini.

The nematode species Criconema (Criconema) spinicaudatumwill and Blandicephalanema nothofagi are associated with M. divaricata.

Introduced mammals such as deers, chamois, and goats will predate M. divaricata. Common brush tailed possums will also predate M. divaricata, but this is very rare. Despite being susceptible to mammalian browsing, M. divaricata is very tolerant because of its diveracate form.

Plants known to parasitise Myrsine divaricata include mistletoes from the genus Korthalsella. Both Korthalsella lindsayi, and Korthalsella clavata use M. divaricata as a host.

== Evolution ==
The divaricate form in M. divaricata is theorised to have coevolved as defensive adaptation against the moa. It is believed that the divaricate form prevented heavy moa predation on leaves tightly held within the plant's branches.

The stems of divaricate plant species also have almost twice the tensile strength of non-divaricate plant species on average. Myrsine divaricata specifically has a stem tensile strength of 16.6 N/mm-2. This means that it would take more strength for a moa to break the stems of divaricate plant species.

Ostriches (an extant relative of moa) in cafeteria-style trials have been shown to strongly select M. divaricata, providing affirmation towards the fact that the divaricate form did not deter moa browsing, but was useful in preventing damage.

== Chromosome number ==
The chromosome number of M. divaricata is 2n = 46.
