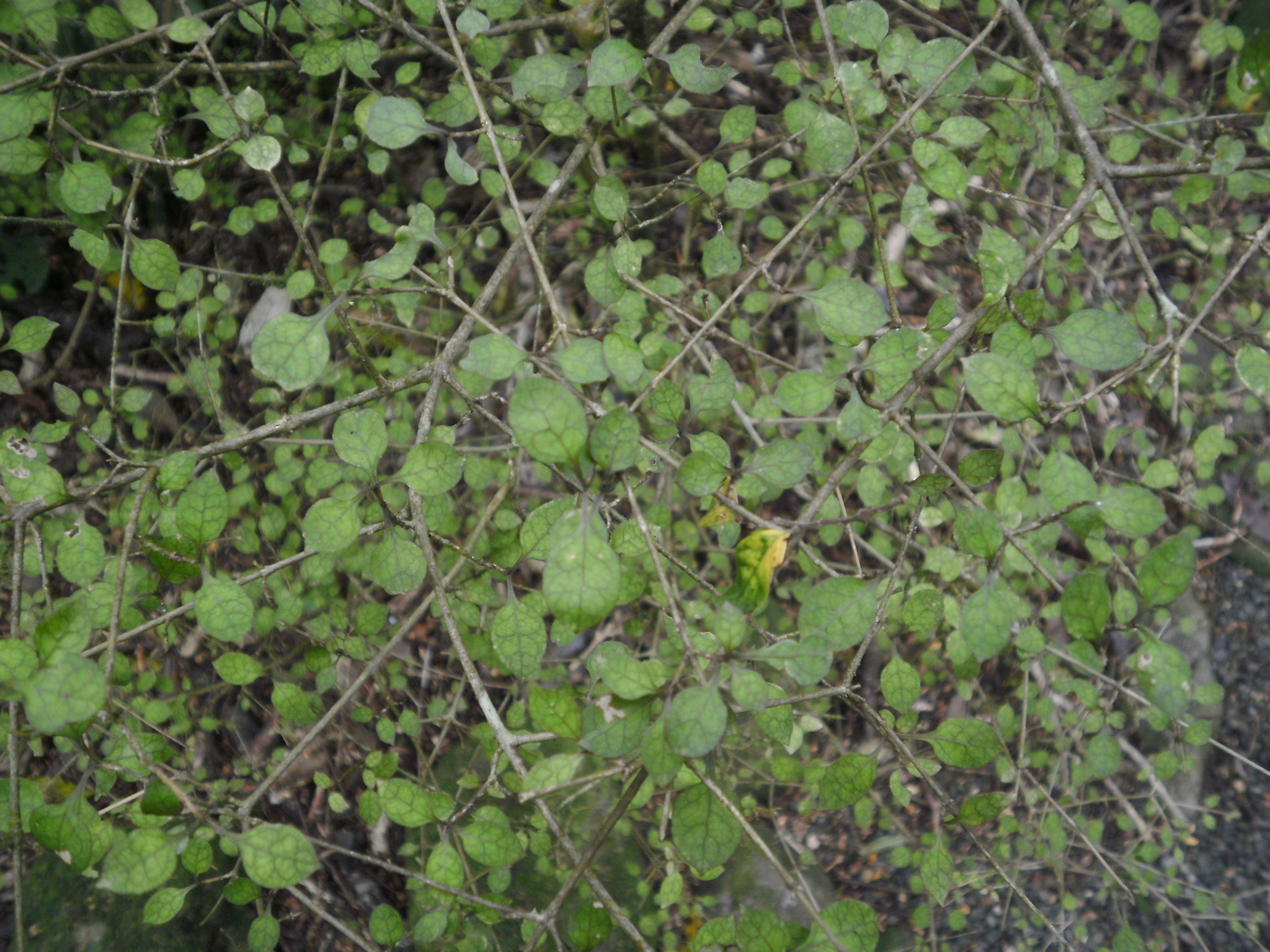

Scientific classification
- Kingdom: Plantae
- Clade: Tracheophytes
- Clade: Angiosperms
- Clade: Eudicots
- Clade: Asterids
- Order: Gentianales
- Family: Rubiaceae
- Genus: Coprosma
- Species: C. areolata

Binomial name
- Coprosma areolata Cheeseman, 1886

= Coprosma areolata =

Species of plant

Coprosma areolata, commonly known as thin-leaved coprosma, is a species of shrub that is native to New Zealand. C. areolata grows in wet, lowland forest and can also grow in exposed places. Coprosma is from the Greek kopros 'dung' and osme 'smell', referring to the foul smell of the species, literally 'dung smell'. And areolata is netted, with a network pattern between the veins.
