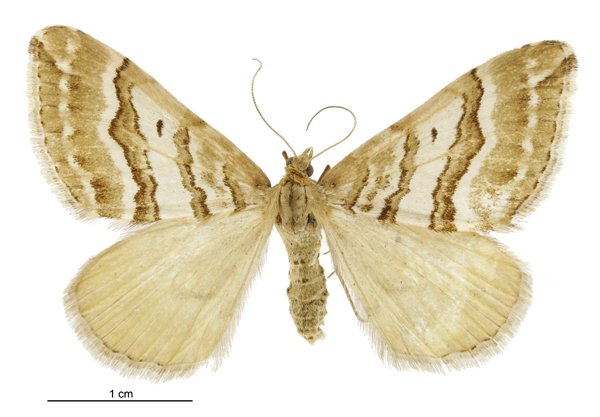
- Female
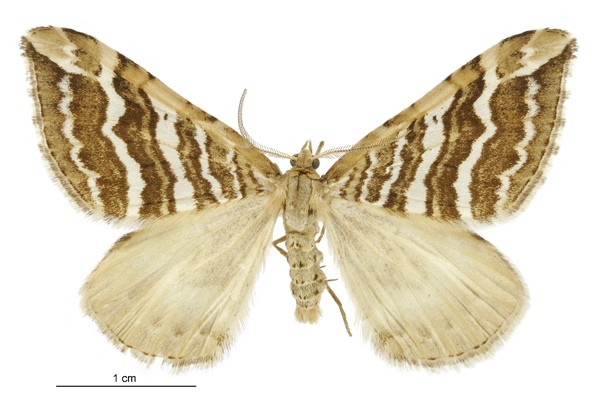
- Male

Scientific classification
- Kingdom: Animalia
- Phylum: Arthropoda
- Clade: Pancrustacea
- Class: Insecta
- Order: Lepidoptera
- Family: Geometridae
- Genus: Asaphodes
- Species: A. cataphracta

Binomial name
- Asaphodes cataphracta (Meyrick, 1883)

Synonyms
- Larentia cataphracta Meyrick, 1883; Xanthorhoe cataphracta (Meyrick, 1883)

= Asaphodes cataphracta =

Species of moth

Asaphodes cataphracta, also known as the western brown carpet moth, is a moth in the family Geometridae. It is endemic to New Zealand and is found in the North and South Island. This species prefers grassy or tussock covered mountain side slopes as habitat. The adults of this species are on the wing from December until March. The larvae of A. cataphracta is known to consume native mountain buttercups (Ranunculaceae).

== Taxonomy ==
This species was first described by Edward Meyrick in 1883 as Larentia cataphracta using specimens collected at Arthur's Pass at 3,000 feet, Lake Guyon, and Lake Wakatipu at 4,000 feet. Meyrick gave a fuller description of the species later in 1884. George Hudson discussed the species in his 1898 volume New Zealand moths and butterflies and referred to it as Xanthorhoe cataphracta. In 1971 John S. Dugdale placed this species in the genus Asaphodes. This placement was reaffirmed by Dugdale in 1988. The female lectotype, collected at Arthur's Pass, is held at the Natural History Museum, London.

== Description ==
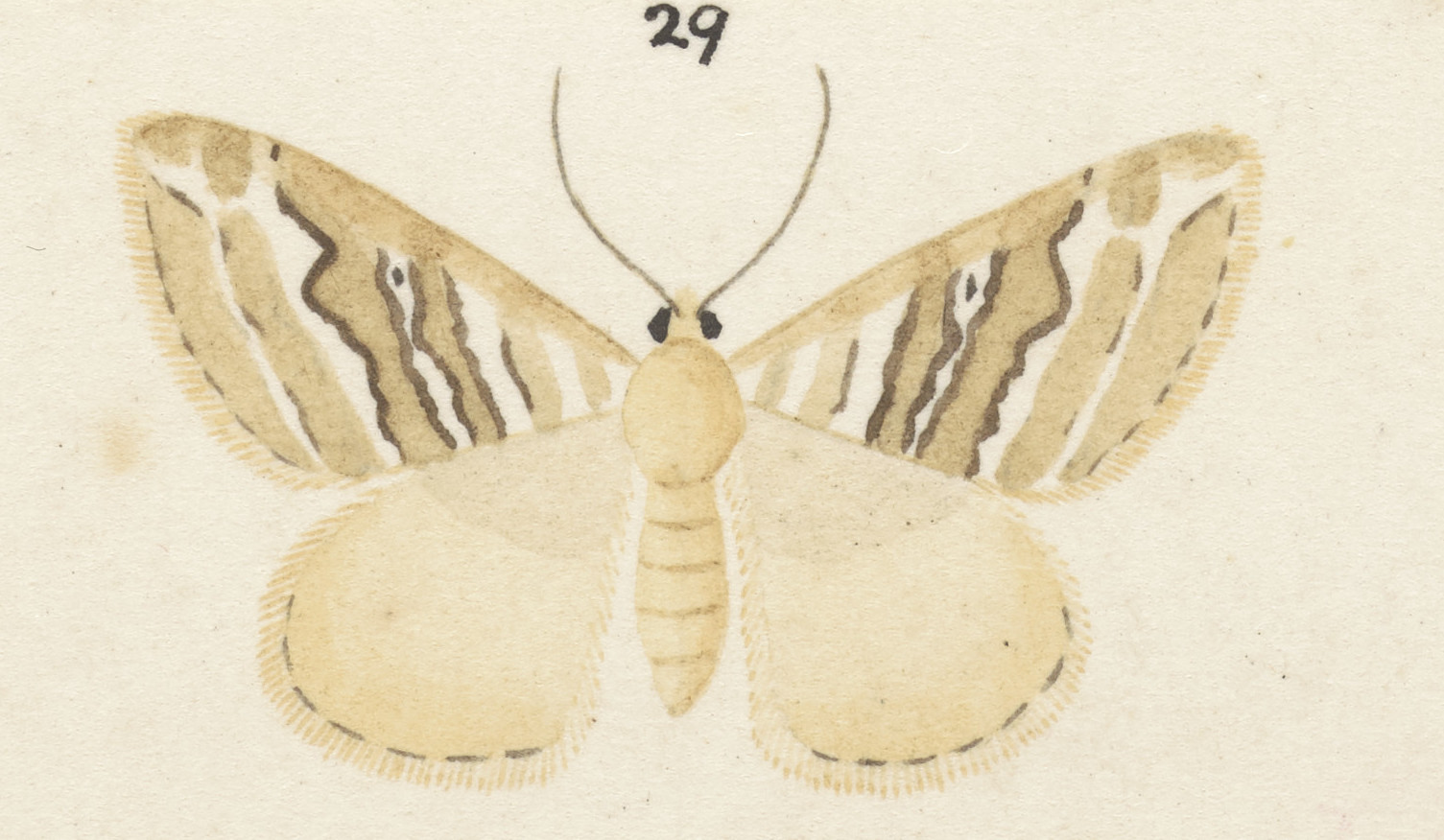
Illustration of female A. cataphracta by George Hudson.

Hudson described the species as follows:

The fore-wings are dull yellowish-brown, with numerous slightly waved oblique black and white transverse bands; one very broad white band is situated near the middle, and another at about three-fourths; there is a broad longitudinal reddish-brown line on the costal edge, in which the transverse lines almost disappear; there is also a pale, somewhat triangular, area at the apex. The hind-wings are very pale greyish-ochreous. The cilia of all the wings are very pale ochreous. The female is duller and paler than the male.

== Distribution and habitat ==
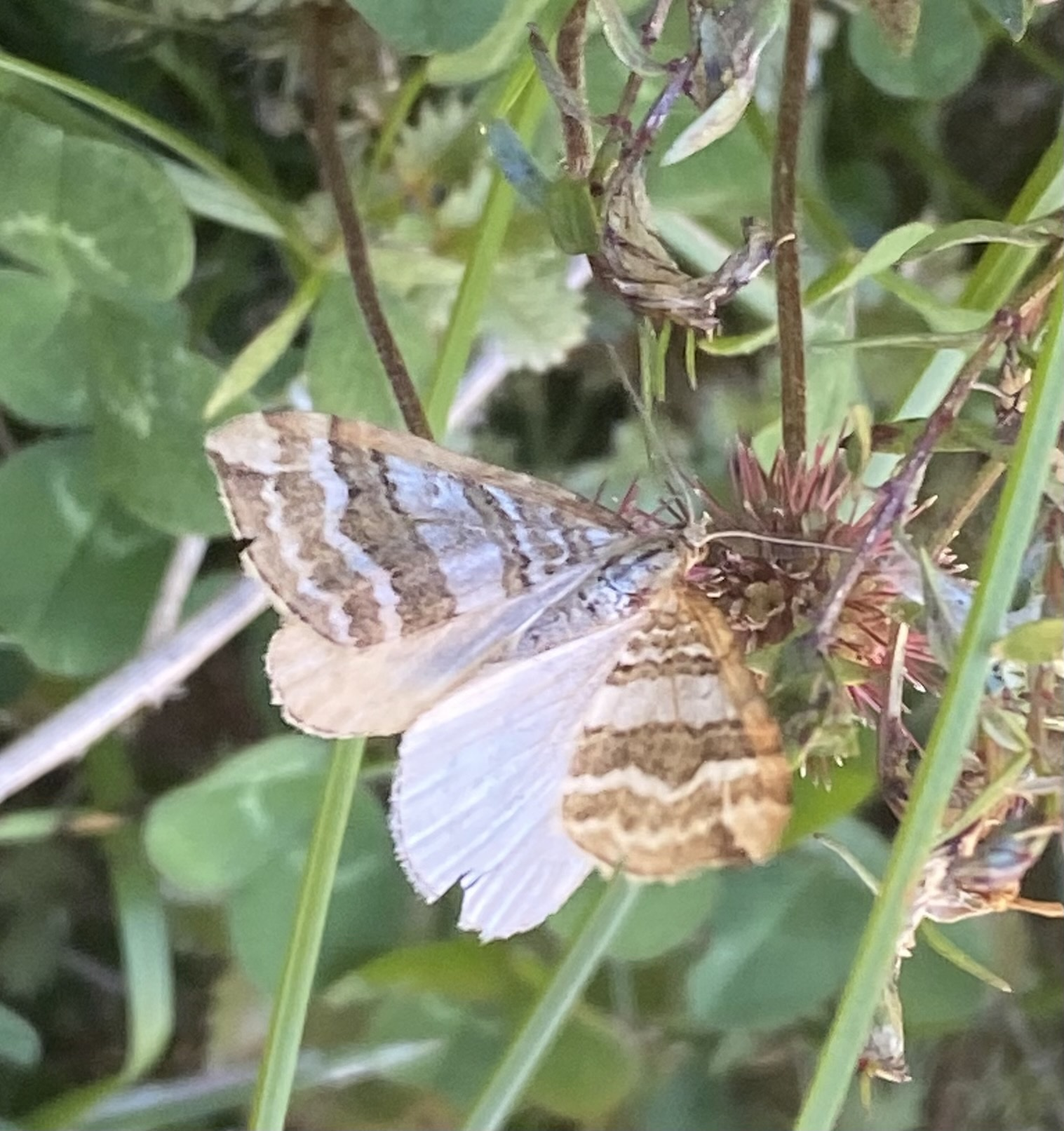
Observation of live A. cataphracta.

A. cataphracta is endemic to New Zealand. It can be found in the North Island and the South Island. It prefers grassy mountain side slopes as habitat. Specimens of this species have been collected in the North Canterbury (NC) and Westland (WD) specimen collection localities as described by Crosby et al. The species was collected in February in the Mount Cook district by Alfred Philpott as well as at Arthur's Pass to Lake Wakatipu up to 1200m by Meyrick. Hudson stated the species occurred in abundance in the Humboldt mountains. Specimens were also collected in tussock country near the Homer saddle by George Howes.

== Behaviour ==
The adults of this species are on the wing from December until March. They are a day flying moth.

== Habitat and host species ==
This species inhabits grassy slopes containing its host species at altitudes of between 1000–1300 m. The larvae of this species is known to consume native mountain buttercups (Ranunculaceae).
