= List of moths of Australia (Galacticidae) =

Partial list of Australian moths

This is a list of the Australian moth species of the family Galacticidae. It also acts as an index to the species articles and forms part of the full List of moths of Australia.

- Homadaula coscinopa Lower, 1900
- Homadaula lasiochroa Lower, 1899
- Homadaula myriospila Meyrick, 1907
- Homadaula poliodes Meyrick, 1907
- Tanaoctena ooptila Turner, 1913
- Tanaoctena pygmaeodes (Turner, 1926)
