= Galactica inornata =

Scientific classification
- Domain: Eukaryota
- Kingdom: Animalia
- Phylum: Arthropoda
- Class: Insecta
- Order: Lepidoptera
- Family: Galacticidae
- Genus: Galactica
- Species: G. inornata

Binomial name
- Galactica inornata (Walsingham, 1900)

Synonyms
- Mieza inornata Walsingham, 1900

Species of moth

Galactica inornata is a moth in the family Galacticidae. It was first described by Thomas de Grey, 6th Baron Walsingham in 1900. It is endemic to Socotra (Yemen). It might actually belong to the genus Homadaula.

The wingspan is about 12 mm. The forewings are dull greyish white, the veins and cell narrowly marked out by lines of brownish grey, the costa and the dorsum beneath the fold slightly suffused with the same. The hindwings are dirty whitish cinereous.
