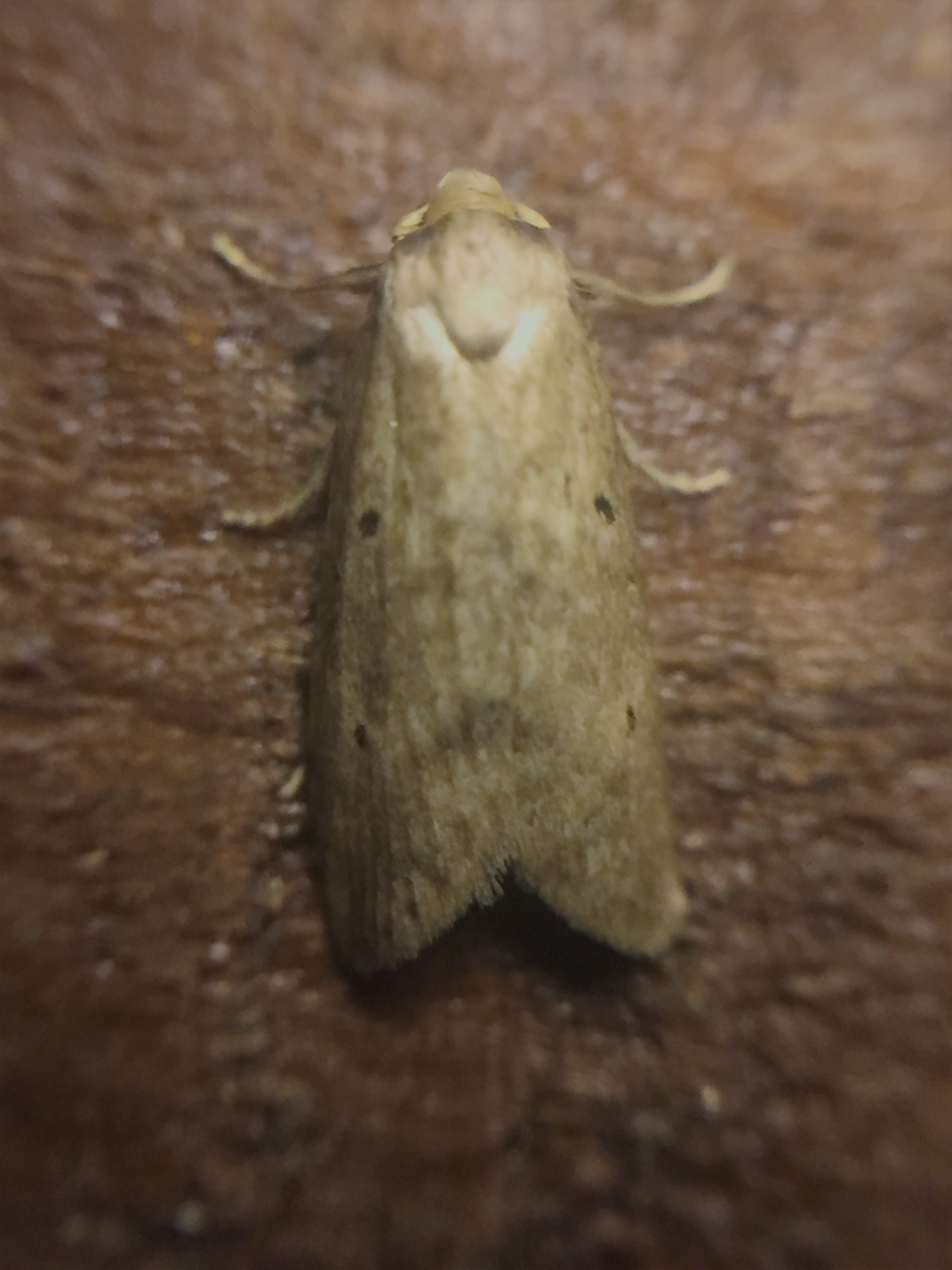

Scientific classification
- Domain: Eukaryota
- Kingdom: Animalia
- Phylum: Arthropoda
- Class: Insecta
- Order: Lepidoptera
- Family: Galacticidae
- Genus: Tanaoctena
- Species: T. dubia

Binomial name
- Tanaoctena dubia Philpott, 1931

Synonyms
- Tanaoctenota dubia (Philpott, 1931)

= Tanaoctena dubia =

Species of moth

Tanaoctena dubia, the Karamu shoot borer or Coprosma shoot borer moth, is a moth in the family Galacticidae. It was described by Alfred Philpott in 1931. It is endemic to New Zealand and has been observed in the northern half of the North Island.

== Taxonomy ==
This species was first described by Alfred Philpott in 1931 using specimens taken in Auckland in January. George Hudson discussed and illustrated this species in his 1939 book under the misspelled name Tanaoctenota dubia. The male holotype specimen, collected by Charles E. Clarke, is held at the Auckland War Memorial Museum.

== Description ==
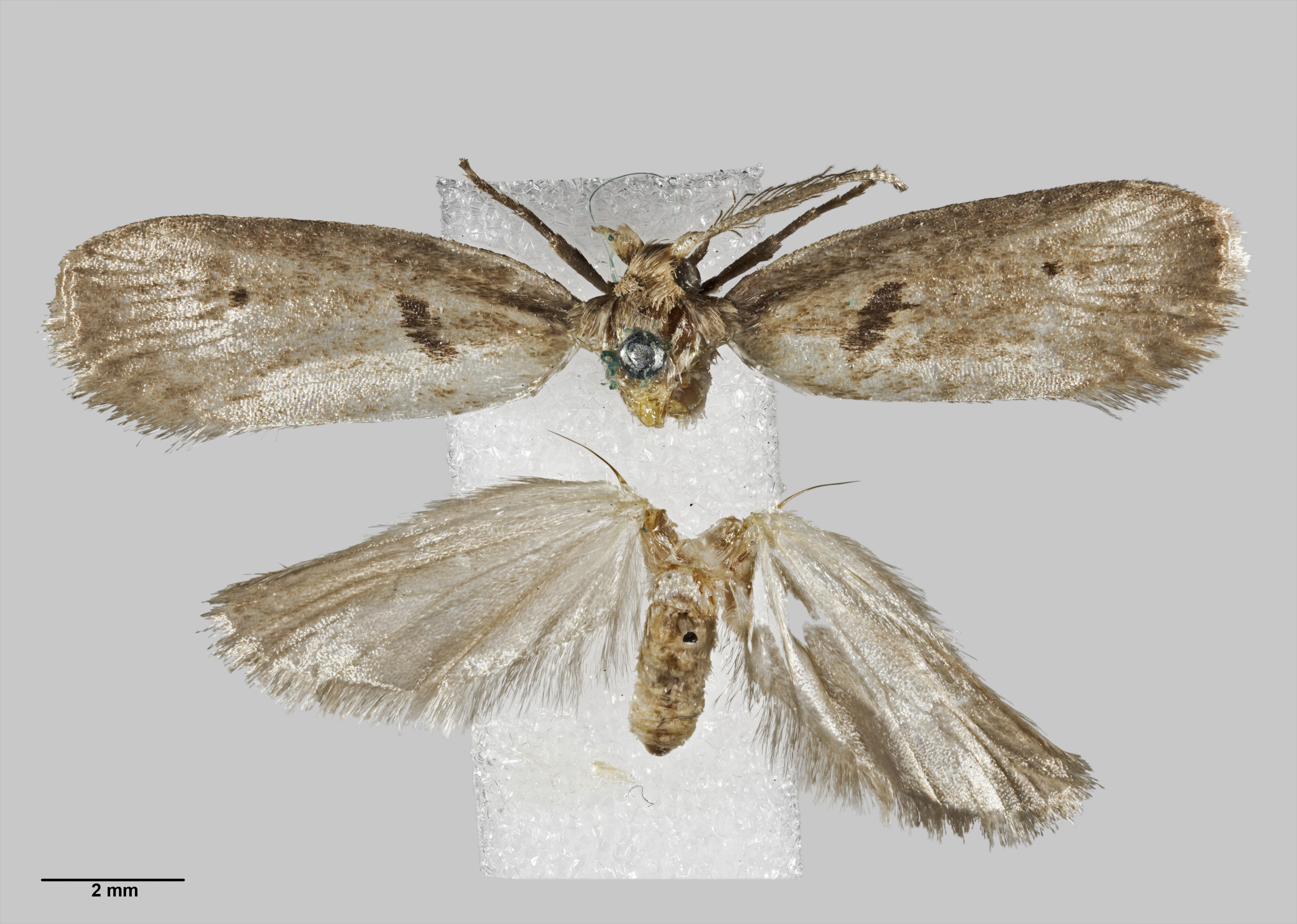
Male holotype.

Philpott described this species as follows:

♂. 18 mm. Head and palpi dull ochreous. Antennae strongly bipectinated and with dense pecten, brown. Thorax pale brown. Abdomen whitish ochreous. Legs ochreous, anterior pair fuscous, tarsi annulated with ochreous. Forewings elongate-oval, costa strongly arched, apex broadly rounded, termen rounded, oblique; dull brownish; an inwardly oblique thick blackish fuscous mark in disc at about ¼; a small round blackish fuscous discal dot at ⅔: fringes dull brown. Hindwings and fringes fuscous grey.

== Distribution ==
This species is endemic to New Zealand. It has been observed in the northern parts of the North Island.

== Behaviour ==
This species is on the wing in from September until May.

== Hosts ==
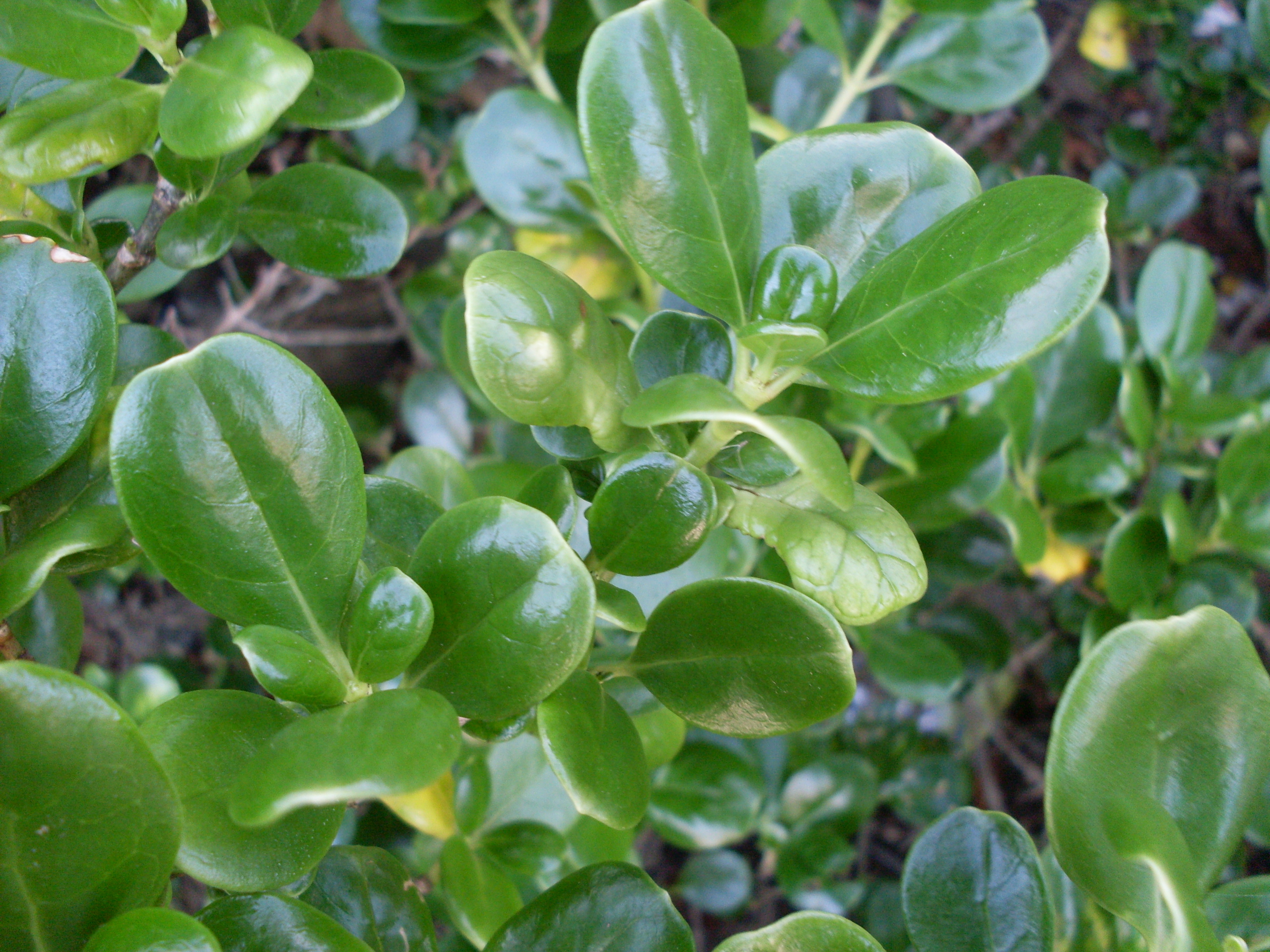
Larval host C. repens.

The larvae feed on Coprosma species such as C. autumnalis, C. macrocarpa, C. repens and C. robusta. They mine the leaves of their host plant, but also bore into the growing shoot tips, causing these shoots to wilt.
