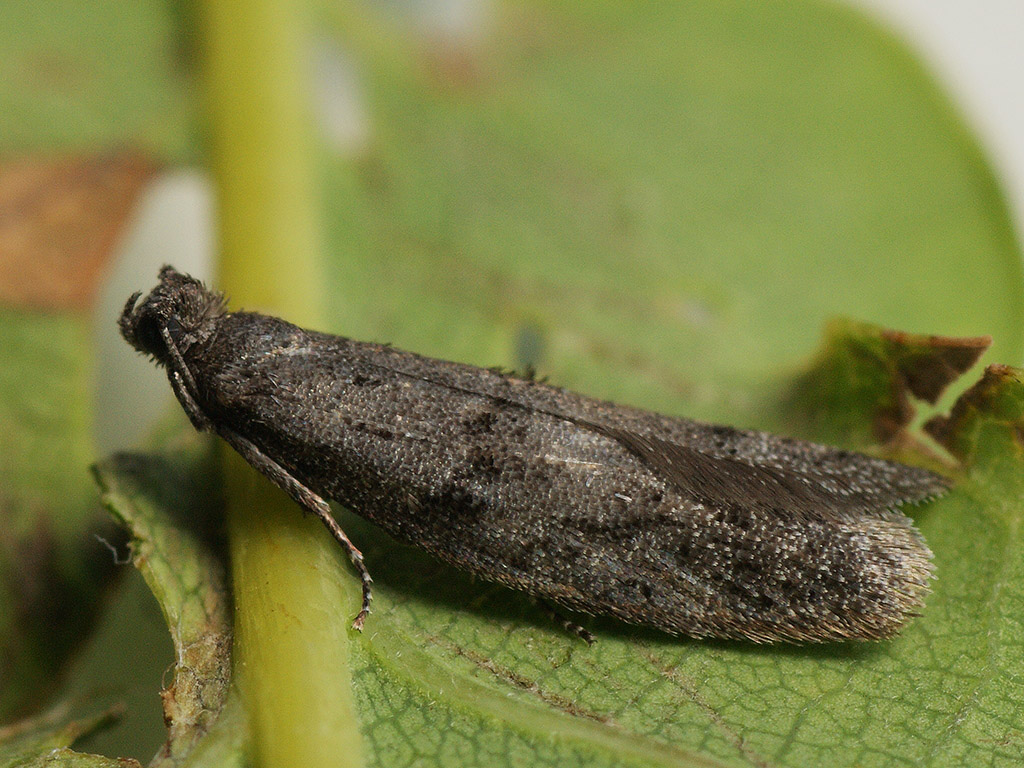
- Wockia asperipunctella

Scientific classification
- Kingdom: Animalia
- Phylum: Arthropoda
- Clade: Pancrustacea
- Class: Insecta
- Order: Lepidoptera
- Infraorder: Heteroneura
- Clade: Eulepidoptera
- Clade: Ditrysia
- Clade: Apoditrysia
- Superfamily: Urodoidea; Kyrki, 1988
- Family: Urodidae; Kyrki, 1988

Genera
- Adixoana Strand, [1913]; Spiladarcha Meyrick, 1913; =Anchimacheta Walsingham, 1914; Urodus Herrich-Schäffer, 1854; =Aperla Walker, 1856; =Paratiquadra Walsingham, 1897; =Pexicnemidia Möschler, 1890; =Trichostibas Zeller, 1863; Wockia Heinemann, 1870; =Patula Bruand, 1850; =Pygmocrates Meyrick, 1932

Diversity
- over 60 species

= Urodidae =

Small family of moths

Urodidae, whose species are commonly known as false burnet moths, is a family of moths in the lepidopteran order. It is the type genus in the superfamily, Urodoidea, with three genera, one of which, Wockia, occurs in Europe.

== Taxonomy and systematics ==
Urodidae were previously included in the superfamily Yponomeutoidea (Kyrki, 1984, 1988) and have also been lumped with Galacticidae (Heppner, 1991, 1997) or with other Sesioidea (Heppner, 1998). They belong to the lower part of the lepidopteran clade "Apoditrysia" (Dugdale et al., 1999) (i.e. not "Obtectomera"), but their closest relatives are as yet unknown and it is hoped that DNA sequencing can help resolve this question.

Urodidae was formerly the only family in the superfamily Urodoidea, but in 2020 a new family was described within Urodoidea, Ustyurtiidae.

== Morphology and identification ==
Urodidae resemble some Zygaenidae: Procridinae at rest. These small to medium-sized moths measure 11 to 37 mm in wingspan and often have a greyish or mottled forewing background colour. The male adult has a "hairpencil" on the costa of the hindwing. In the caterpillar, the placement of the setae and structure of the prolegs is diagnostic, and the pupal segments I–II are fixed. On the head, there are no ocelli or "chaetosemata" and the proboscis even at the base is unscaled. An "epiphysis" is present on the foreleg (Dugdale et al. (1999), and for more details).

== Distribution ==
The genera Urodus and Spiladarcha occur in the Neotropics while Wockia asperipunctella occurs in Europe and has recently been found in northern North America (Heppner, 1997; Landry, 1998) and unless this is a recent invasion the species would be a good example of a Holarctic distribution pattern.

== Biology and host plants ==
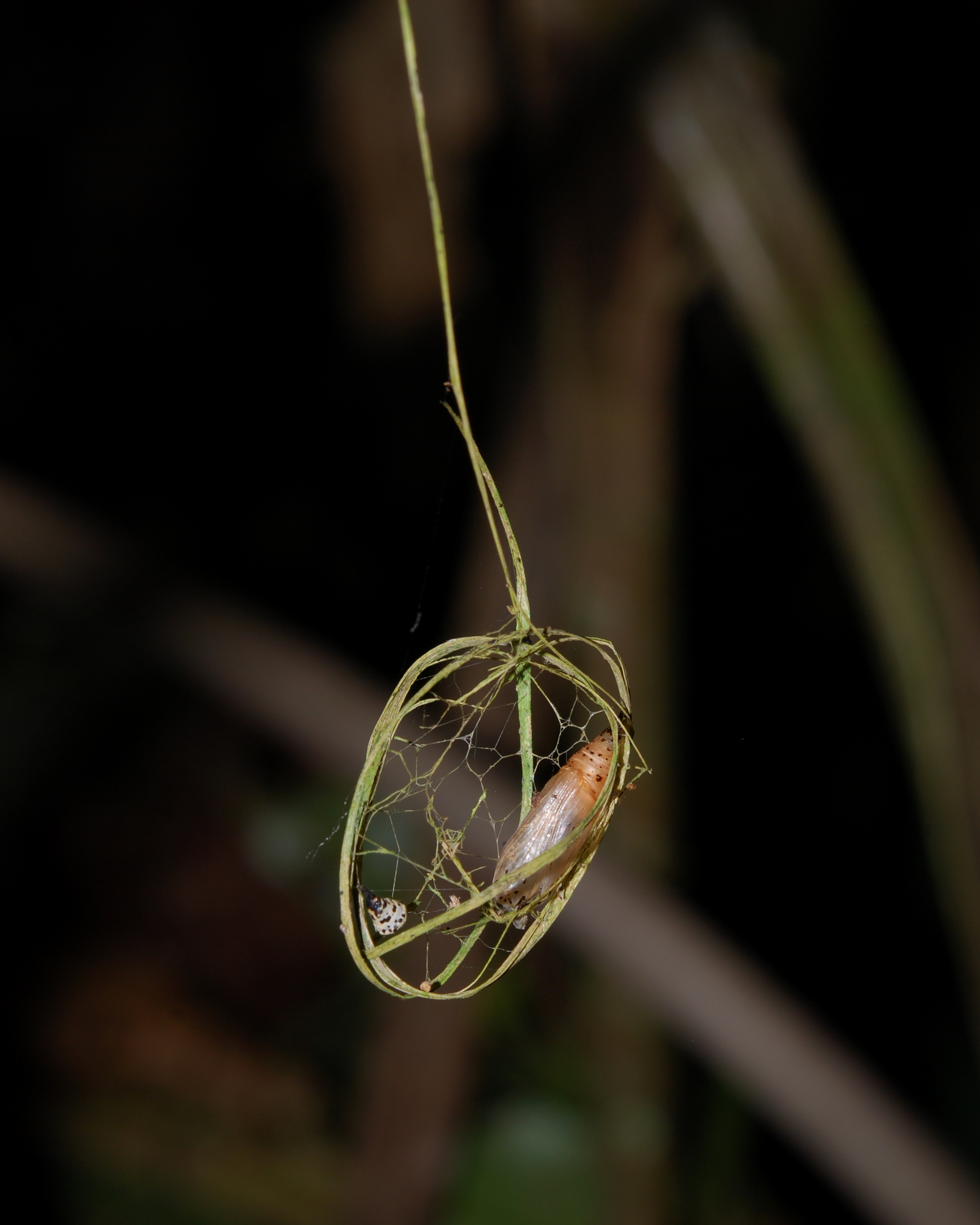
Pupa of an Urodidae species

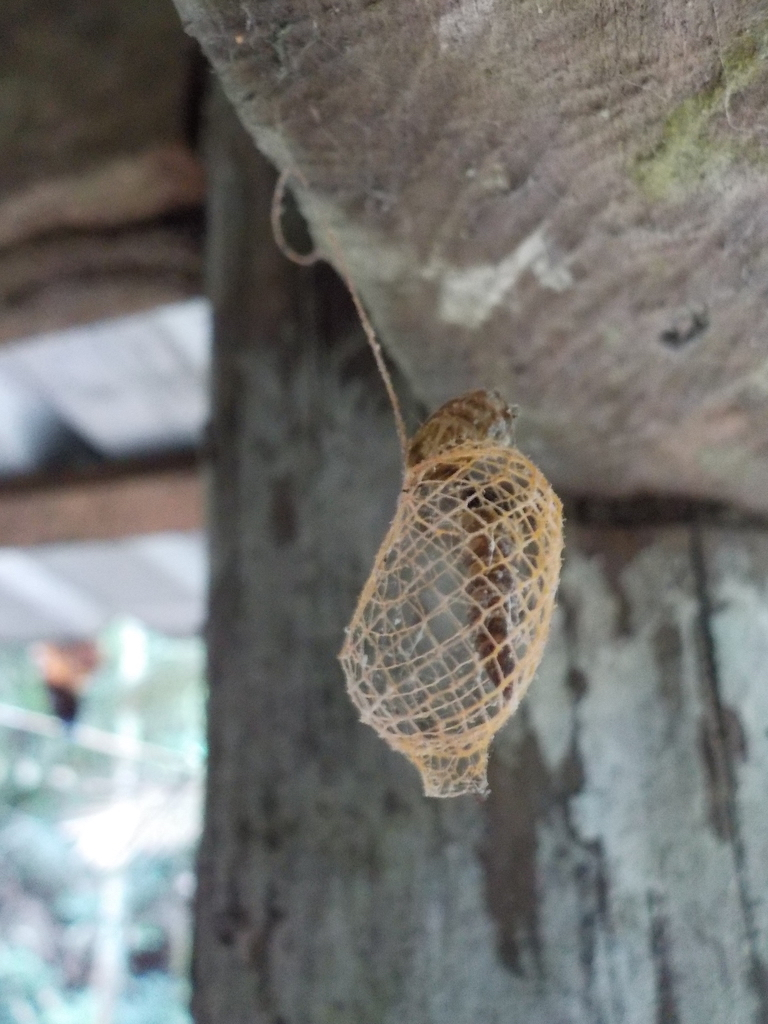
Pupa found under a roof in the Km41 camp (BDFFP) in the Central Amazon

The biology is poorly known, but the larvae can be found on various tree species including some fruit trees. The "bumelia webworm moth" (Urodus parvula) is recorded on Lauraceae: (avocado=Persea), Fagaceae (Quercus), Sapotaceae (Sideroxylon) and Erythroxylaceae: Erythroxylum. Urodus parvula has also been reared on Rutaceae (Citrus) and Malvaceae (Hibiscus). W. asperipunctella has in North America been reared from quaking aspen (Populus tremuloides) (Landry, 1998) and also Salix in Europe. The pupa is contained in an open-mesh cocoon, which can be bright orange in colour, and is sometimes suspended on a very long thread below a leaf.

== Species ==
The following is a list of selected species:

- Geoesthia ceylonica Sohn, 2014 [type locality Sri Lanka]
- Spiladarcha capnodes (Walsingham, 1914) (originally in Anchimacheta)
- Spiladarcha derelicta Meyrick, 1913 [type locality British Guiana]
- Spiladarcha iodes (Walsingham, 1914) (originally in Anchimacheta)
- Spiladarcha tolmetes (Walsingham, 1914) (originally in Anchimacheta)
- Urodus amphilocha Meyrick, 1923
- Urodus aphanoptis Meyrick, 1930
- Urodus aphrogama Meyrick, 1936 (from Rio Grande do Sul, Brazil)
- Urodus auchmera Walsingham, 1914
- Urodus brachyanches Meyrick, 1931
- Urodus calligera Zeller, 1877
- Urodus carabopa Meyrick, 1925
- Urodus chiquita Busck, 1910
- Urodus chrysoconis Meyrick, 1932
- Urodus costaricae Busck, 1910
- Urodus cumulata Walsingham, 1914
- Urodus cyanombra Meyrick, 1913
- Urodus cyclopica Meyrick, 1930
- Urodus decens Meyrick, 1925
- Urodus distincta Strand, 1911
- Urodus favigera Meyrick, 1913
- Urodus fonteboae Strand, 1911
- Urodus forficulella (Walsingham, 1897) (originally in Paratiquadra)
- Urodus fulminalis Meyrick, 1931
- Urodus fumosa (Zeller, 1863) (originally in Trichostibas)
- Urodus hephaestiella (Zeller, 1877)
- Urodus hexacentris Meyrick, 1931
- Urodus imitans Felder, 1875
- Urodus imitata Druce, 1884
- Urodus iophlebia Zeller, 1877
- Urodus isoxesta Meyrick, 1932
- Urodus isthmiella Busck, 1910
- ?Urodus lissopeda (Meyrick, 1932) (originally in Pygmocrates)
- Urodus lithophaea Meyrick, 1913
- Urodus marantica Walsingham, 1914
- Urodus merida Strand, 1911
- Urodus mirella (Möschler, 1890) (originally in Pexicnemidia)
- Urodus modesta Druce, 1884
- Urodus niphatma Meyrick, 1925
- Urodus opticosema Meyrick, 1930
- Urodus ovata Zeller, 1877
- Urodus pallidicostella Walsingham, 1897
- Urodus pamporphyra Meyrick, 1936 (from Rio Grande do Sul, Brazil)
- Urodus parvula Edwards, 1881
- Urodus perischias Meyrick, 1925
- Urodus porphyrina Meyrick, 1932
- Urodus praetextata Meyrick, 1913
- Urodus procridias Meyrick, 1936 (from Rio Grande do Sul, Brazil)
- Urodus pulvinata Meyrick, 1923
- Urodus sanctipaulensis Strand, 1911
- Urodus scythrochalca Meyrick, 1932
- Urodus sordidata Zeller, 1877
- Urodus spumescens Meyrick, 1925
- Urodus staphylina Meyrick, 1932
- Urodus subcaerulea Dognin, 1910
- Urodus sympiestis Meyrick, 1925
- Urodus tineiformis (Walker, 1856) (originally in Aperla)
- Urodus transverseguttata Zeller, 1877
- Urodus triancycla Meyrick, 1931
- Urodus venatella Busck, 1910
- Urodus xiphura Meyrick, 1931
- Wockia asperipunctella Bruand, 1850

== Sources ==
- Firefly Encyclopedia of Insects and Spiders, edited by Christopher O'Toole, ISBN 1-55297-612-2, 2002. [Vernacular name]
- The systematic position of Wockia Heinemann, 1870, and related genera (Lepidoptera: Ditrysia: Yponomeutidae auct.). Nota Lepidopterologica, 11(1): 53.
