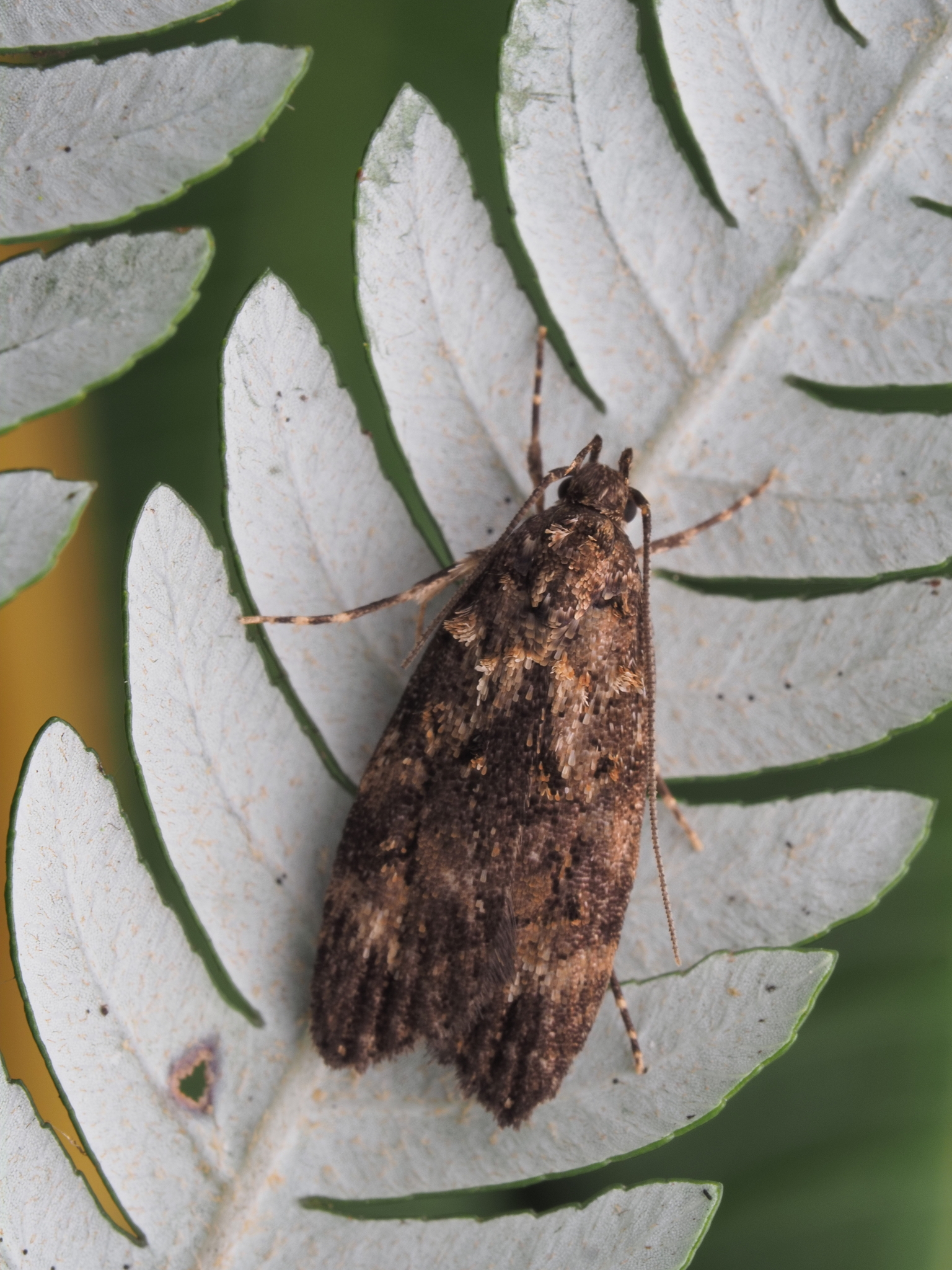

Scientific classification
- Kingdom: Animalia
- Phylum: Arthropoda
- Class: Insecta
- Order: Lepidoptera
- Family: Oecophoridae
- Genus: Izatha
- Species: I. austera

Binomial name
- Izatha austera (Meyrick, 1883)

Synonyms
- Semiocosma austera Meyrick, 1883

= Izatha austera =

Species of moth

Izatha austera is a species of moth in the family Oecophoridae. It was first described by Edward Meyrick in 1883 and is endemic to New Zealand. This species can be found throughout the North Island and has also been observed in the Nelson region in the South Island. The larvae of I. austera feed on dead wood by tunnelling into branches of its host species. The larvae matures from September and is on the wing in the months of December to January. The adult moth is variable in colouration but is seldom observed.

== Taxonomy ==
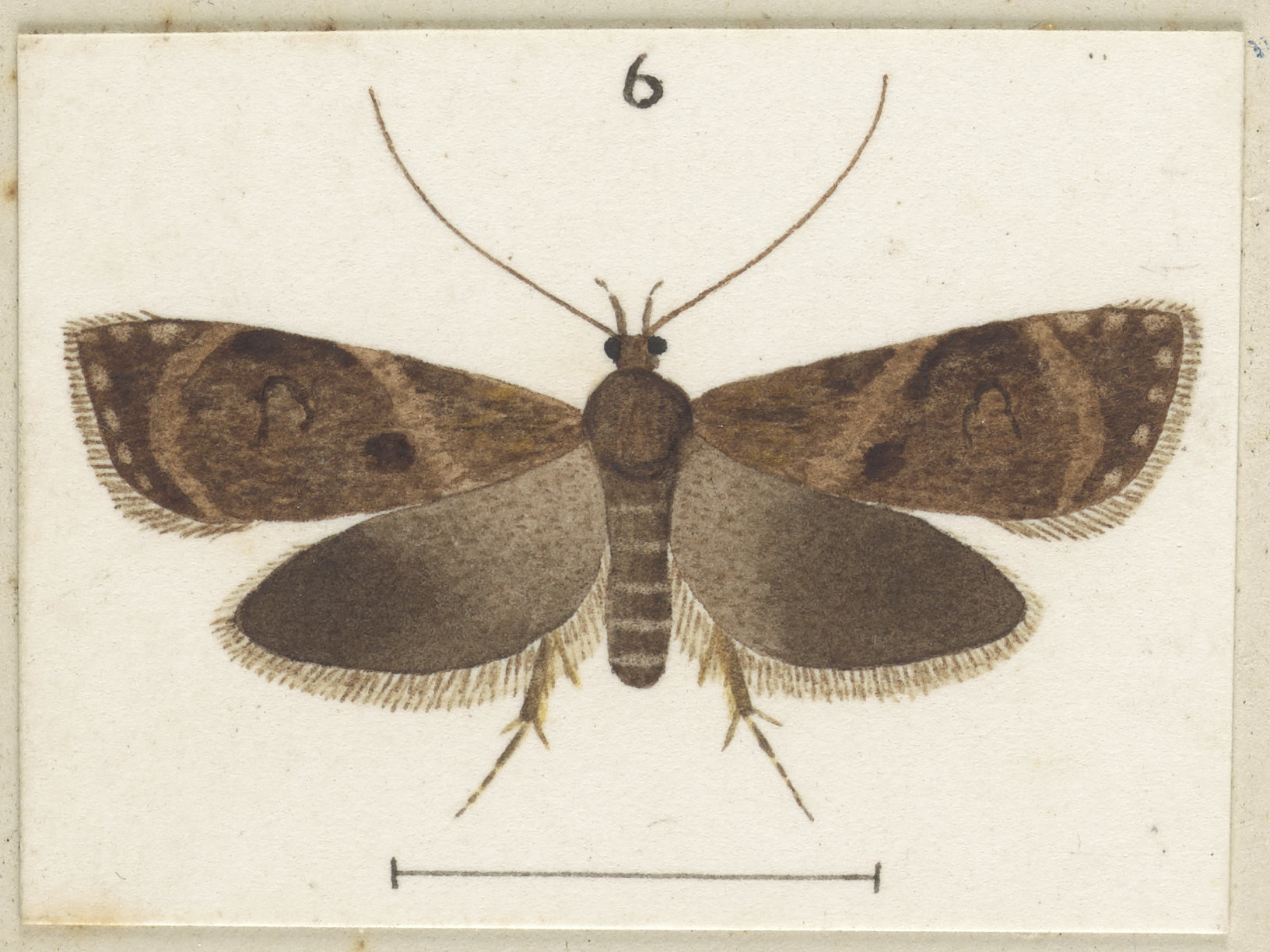
Watercolour by George Hudson c. 1927

I. austera was first described, as Semiocosma austera, by Edward Meyrick in 1883, in brief, and again in greater detail in 1884. Meyrick used two specimens collected in the Botanic Garden and forest in Wellington in January. In 1915 Meyrick placed this species in the genus Izatha. George Hudson discussed and illustrated this species in 1928. The lectotype specimen is held at the Natural History Museum, London.

== Description ==
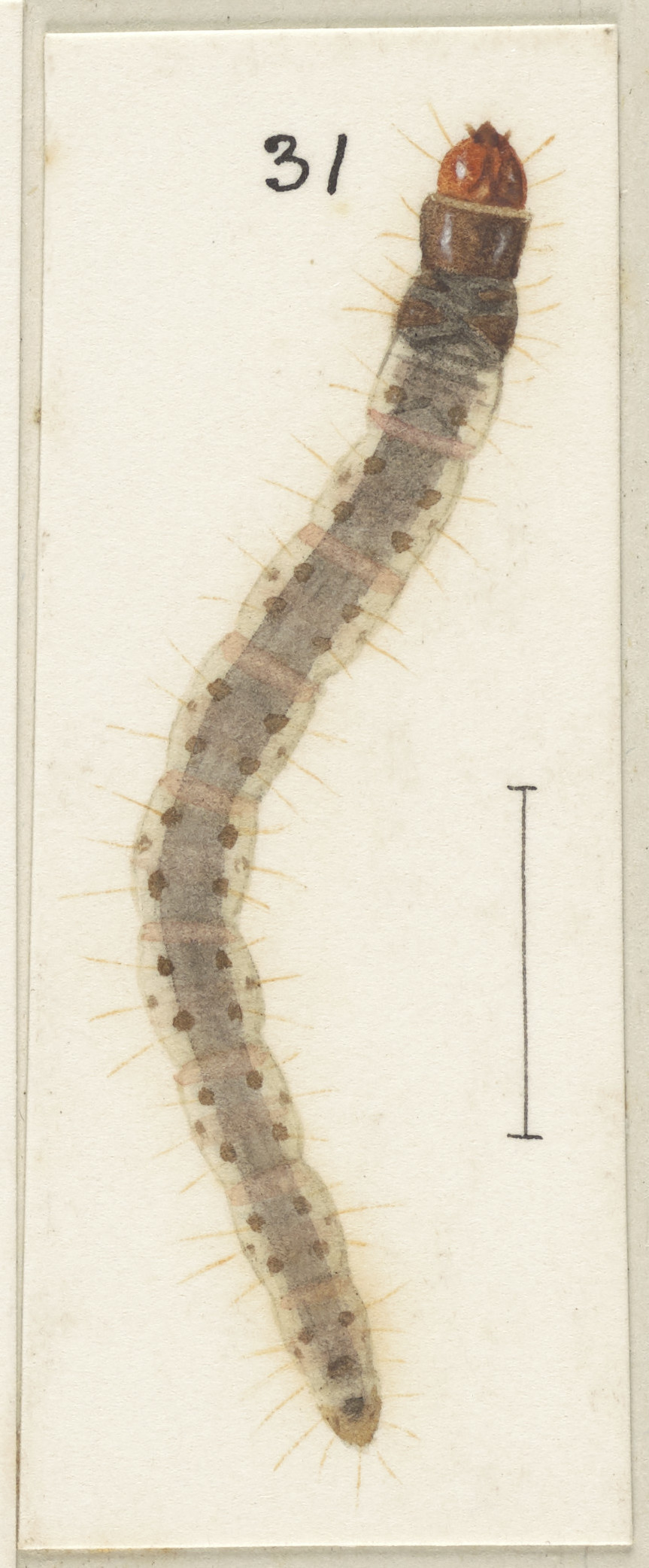
Larva

Hudson described the larvae as follows:

Its length is slightly over 1/2 in.; slender and cylindrical; the head is reddish-brown, highly polished; the second segment dark brown and horny; the third segment has two triangular brown horny dorsal plates; the rest of the body dull ochreous, with a very broad slaty-black dorsal band and four conspicuous horny dorsal tubercles; the terminal segment is horny, yellowish-brown; there is a series of conspicuous lateral tubercles and a whitish lateral ridge; all the tubercles emit long yellowish-brown bristles.

Meyrick described the adults of the species as follows:

Male. — 17-18 mm. Head, antennae, thorax, and abdomen dark fuscous. Palpi dark fuscous, second joint mixed with pale ochreous, terminal joint with a suffused pale ochreous band above and below middle. Legs dark fuscous, median ring of tibiae and apex of all joints whitish-ochreous. Forewings moderate, costa gently arched, apex rounded, hindmargin oblique, hardly rounded; dull fuscous, mixed with darker and lighter; the lighter tint appears to form an obscure transverse fascia before middle parallel to hindmargin, and a curved transverse line from 3/4 of costa to before anal angle; a tuft of dark fuscous scales beneath fold at 1/3; an arched dark fuscous mark in disc beyond middle; hindmargin and apical fourth of costa obscurely spotted with darker : cilia fuscous, with a darker line. Hindwings dark fuscous, somewhat lighter towards base; cilia fuscous, with a cloudy darker line.

The wingspan is 13–19 mm for males and 16.5–25 mm for females. This species is variable in its forewing colouration. I. austera also has noticeable scale-tufts on its forewing. It can be confused with I. dasydisca but the male can be distinguished as it has blackish coloured antennae, a scale-tuft on the third segment of the labial palp, and lacks the pair of large scale-tufts that I. dasydisca has on its forewings.

== Distribution ==
I. austera is endemic to New Zealand. This species is widespread throughout the North Island, with a single South Island record from north-west Nelson. This species is present in Northland, Auckland, Coromandel, Waikato, Bay of Plenty, Taranaki, Taupo, Gisborne, Hawkes Bay, Rangitikei, Wellington and Nelson districts.

== Biology and behaviour ==
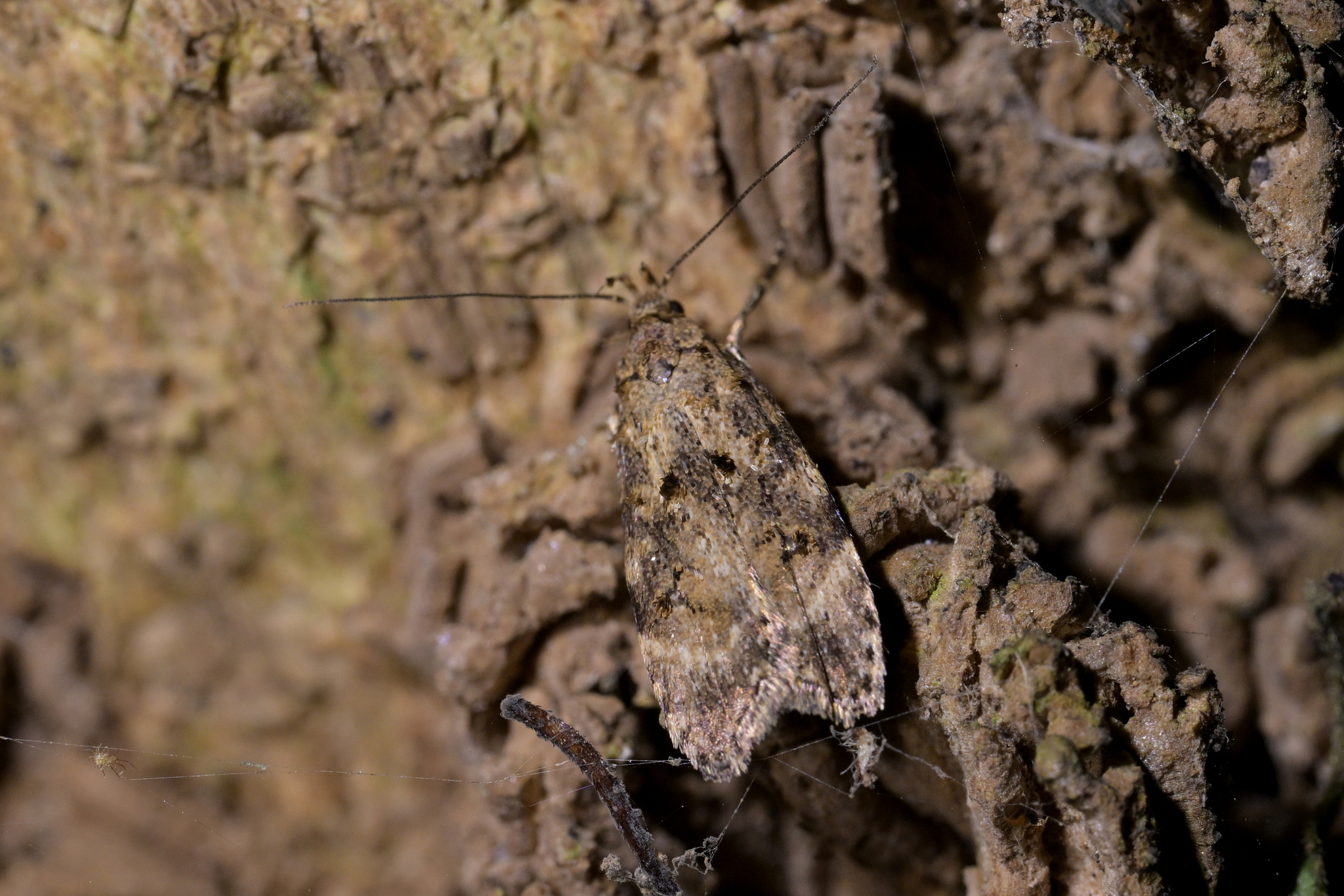
Colouring camouflage of I. austera

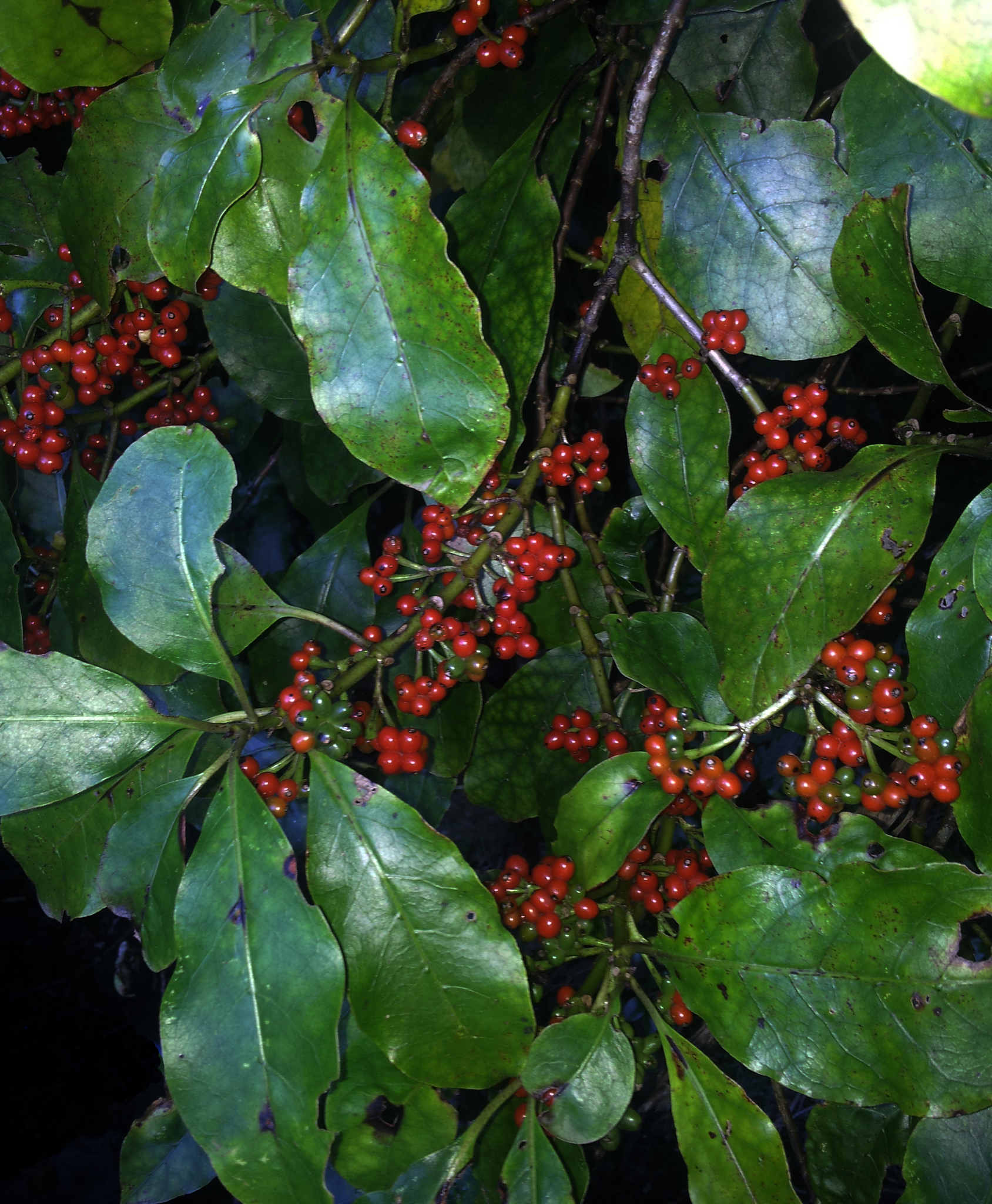
Larval host plant Coprosma grandifolia

Larvae live in silken tubes under the bark of dead branches of its host species. The larvae live during winter months and are mature by the end of September. Adults are on wing from December to February. This species have been collected via sugar traps or by beating shrubs during the daytime. I. austera only comes sparing to light. When resting on bare tree trunks the adult moth is very inconspicuous.

== Habitat and host species ==
Larvae feed during the winter. They have been recorded from dead branches of Aristotelia serrata, Coprosma grandifolia and probably Coprosma robusta, Cordyline australis, Coriaria arborea, Laurelia novae-zelandiae, Litsea calicaris, Melicytus ramiflorus and Olearia rani.
