= Homadaula punctigera =

Scientific classification
- Kingdom: Animalia
- Phylum: Arthropoda
- Class: Insecta
- Order: Lepidoptera
- Family: Galacticidae
- Genus: Homadaula
- Species: H. punctigera

Binomial name
- Homadaula punctigera (Rebel, 1910)

Synonyms
- Paraprays punctigera Rebel, 1910

Species of moth

Homadaula punctigera is a moth in the family Galacticidae. It was described by Rebel in 1910. It is found in the Alai Mountains in Central Asia.

The wingspan is about 16 mm. Adults are dark greyish, with black scales. The hindwings are dark grey.
