= Tanaoctena indubitata =

Scientific classification
- Domain: Eukaryota
- Kingdom: Animalia
- Phylum: Arthropoda
- Class: Insecta
- Order: Lepidoptera
- Family: Galacticidae
- Genus: Tanaoctena
- Species: T. indubitata

Binomial name
- Tanaoctena indubitata Clarke, 1971

Species of moth

Tanaoctena indubitata is a moth in the family Galacticidae. It was described by Clarke in 1971. It is found in French Polynesia (Rapa Iti).
