= Homadaula calamitosa =

Scientific classification
- Kingdom: Animalia
- Phylum: Arthropoda
- Class: Insecta
- Order: Lepidoptera
- Family: Galacticidae
- Genus: Homadaula
- Species: H. calamitosa

Binomial name
- Homadaula calamitosa (Meyrick, 1930)

Synonyms
- Stichotactis calamitosa Meyrick, 1930

Species of moth

Homadaula calamitosa is a moth in the family Galacticidae. It was described by Edward Meyrick in 1930. It is found in Sudan.

The wingspan is 14–15 mm.

The larvae feed on the flowers of Acacia arabica and Acacia nilotica.
