= Homadaula dispertita =

Scientific classification
- Kingdom: Animalia
- Phylum: Arthropoda
- Class: Insecta
- Order: Lepidoptera
- Family: Galacticidae
- Genus: Homadaula
- Species: H. dispertita

Binomial name
- Homadaula dispertita Meyrick, 1922

Species of moth

Homadaula dispertita is a moth in the family Galacticidae. It was described by Edward Meyrick in 1922. It is found in China.

The wingspan is about 15 mm. The forewings are light grey with about thirty moderate or minute scattered irregular black dots, including a subterminal curved series and several others on the termen. The hindwings are grey, but darker posteriorly.
