= Homadaula wieseri =

Scientific classification
- Kingdom: Animalia
- Phylum: Arthropoda
- Clade: Pancrustacea
- Class: Insecta
- Order: Lepidoptera
- Family: Galacticidae
- Genus: Homadaula
- Species: H. wieseri

Binomial name
- Homadaula wieseri Mey, 2011

Species of moth

Homadaula wieseri is a moth in the family Galacticidae. It was described by Wolfram Mey in 2011. It is found in Namibia.
