= Galactica variinotella =

Scientific classification
- Domain: Eukaryota
- Kingdom: Animalia
- Phylum: Arthropoda
- Class: Insecta
- Order: Lepidoptera
- Family: Galacticidae
- Genus: Galactica
- Species: G. variinotella

Binomial name
- Galactica variinotella (Chrétien, 1915)

Synonyms
- Psecadia variinotella Chrétien, 1915

Species of moth

Galactica variinotella is a moth in the family Galacticidae. It was described by Pierre Chrétien in 1915. It is found in Tunisia.

The wingspan is 11–14 mm. The forewings are creamy white, while the hindwings are white, but somewhat greyish towards the margin.
