= Galactica caradjae =

Scientific classification
- Domain: Eukaryota
- Kingdom: Animalia
- Phylum: Arthropoda
- Class: Insecta
- Order: Lepidoptera
- Family: Galacticidae
- Genus: Galactica
- Species: G. caradjae

Binomial name
- Galactica caradjae Walsingham, 1911

Species of moth

Galactica caradjae is a moth in the family Galacticidae. It was described by Walsingham in 1911. It is found in Algeria.

The wingspan is about 13 mm. The forewings are greyish white with a slight rosy tinge and very sparsely sprinkled with black scales, with a patch of these scales resting on the middle of the fold, and a smaller patch a little before its outer extremity. The black scales are distributed very sparsely along the costa, mostly towards the base, on either side of the fold before the black plical patch, and again between this and the smaller patch beyond it, some reaching as far as the end of the cell. There are also a few along the extreme termen, but not at the apex or tornus. The hindwings are shining silvery white, with a slight greyish tinge.
