= Galactica (moth) =

Scientific classification
- Kingdom: Animalia
- Phylum: Arthropoda
- Class: Insecta
- Order: Lepidoptera
- Family: Galacticidae
- Genus: Galactica; Walsingham, 1911

Genus of moths

Galactica is a genus of moths in the family Galacticidae. Mey (2022) argues that it is a junior synonym of Homadaula.

== Selected species ==
There are up to five species:

- Galactica caradjae (Walsingham, 1911)
- Galactica inornata (Walsingham, 1900)
- Galactica pluripunctella (Caradja, 1920)
- Galactica variinotella (Chrétien, 1915)
- Galactica walsinghami (Caradja, 1920)

Mey (2022) places Galactica walsinghami in Zarcinia and recognizes Galactica pluripunctella as a variety within his Zarcinia walsinghami.
