= Homadaula ravula =

Scientific classification
- Kingdom: Animalia
- Phylum: Arthropoda
- Clade: Pancrustacea
- Class: Insecta
- Order: Lepidoptera
- Family: Galacticidae
- Genus: Homadaula
- Species: H. ravula

Binomial name
- Homadaula ravula Mey, 2004

Species of moth

Homadaula ravula is a moth in the family Galacticidae. It was described by Wolfram Mey in 2004. It is found in Angola, Madagascar, Malawi, Namibia and Zimbabwe.
