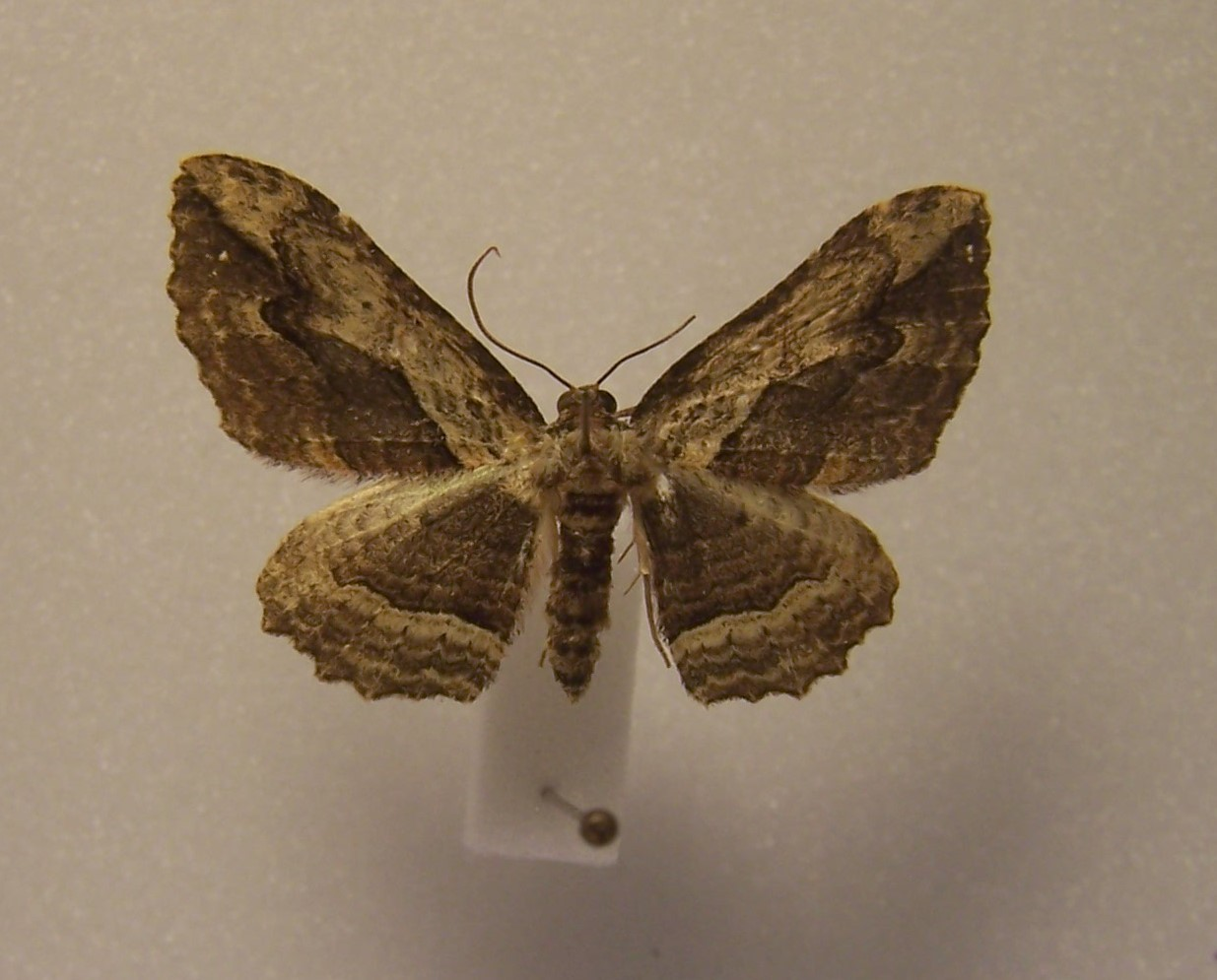

Scientific classification
- Kingdom: Animalia
- Phylum: Arthropoda
- Clade: Pancrustacea
- Class: Insecta
- Order: Lepidoptera
- Family: Geometridae
- Genus: Austrocidaria
- Species: A. bipartita

Binomial name
- Austrocidaria bipartita (Prout, 1958)

Synonyms
- Horisme anguligera bipartita Prout, 1958

= Austrocidaria bipartita =

Species of moth endemic to New Zealand

Austrocidaria bipartita is a species of moth of the family Geometridae. It endemic to New Zealand. It was first described by Louis Beethoven Prout in 1958. This species is found throughout New Zealand and adults are on the wing all year round. Adults are nocturnal and are attracted to light. The larval host plants of this moth are species in the genus Coprosma.

== Taxonomy ==
This species was first described by Louis Beethoven Prout in 1958 as an aberration of the species Horisme anguligera. John S. Dugdale raised this moth to species level in 1988 on the basis that the colour pattern as well as the male genitalia of this species was distinctive. The male holotype, collected by W. George Howes in Wellington, is held at the Natural History Museum, London.

== Description ==
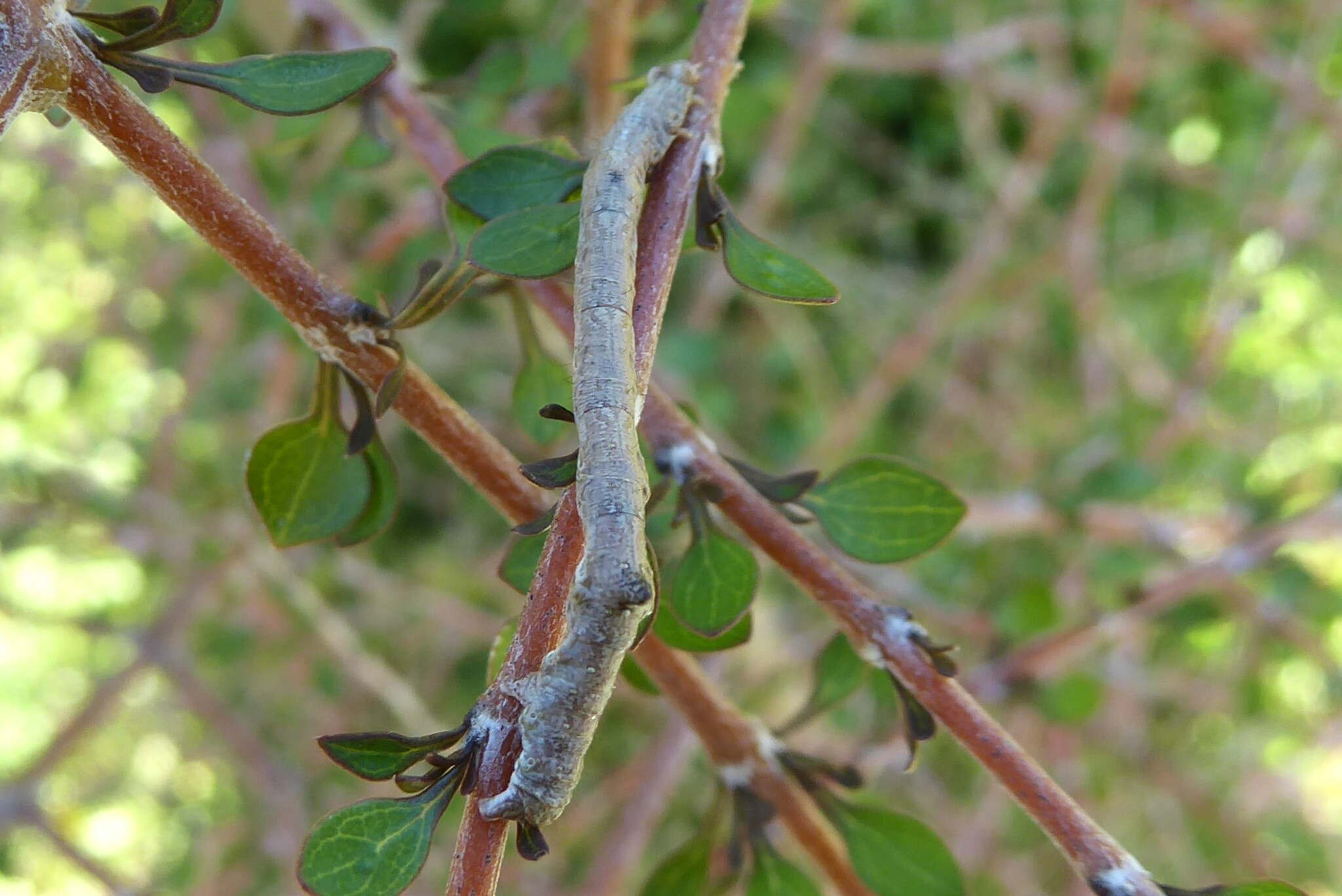
A. bipartita larva.

The larvae are grey in colour and have two raised areas on its abdominal segments.

Prout first described the adult of this species as follows:

Fore wing : anterior of a line from the apex to two-sevenths of the inner margin the wing is light buff, lightly irrorate with fuscous along the costa; posterior of it the wing is drab irrorate with fuscous, the light buff, postmedial fascia being marked only between veins R, and M, and at the inner margin. Hind wing : costa and postmedial fascia broadly, subterminal fascia slenderly light buff; remainder of wing drab irrorate with fuscous and transversed by several slender, fuscous fasciae.

Although this species can be confused with A. anguligera it can be distinguished by studying the pattern below the middle of the forewing as it has a distinctive, dark tooth-like marking. The female of this species has an ochreous-brown wing colour with white markings.

== Distribution ==
This species is endemic to New Zealand. It is found in the North, South and Stewart Islands as well as at the Poor Knights Islands.

== Habitat and hosts ==
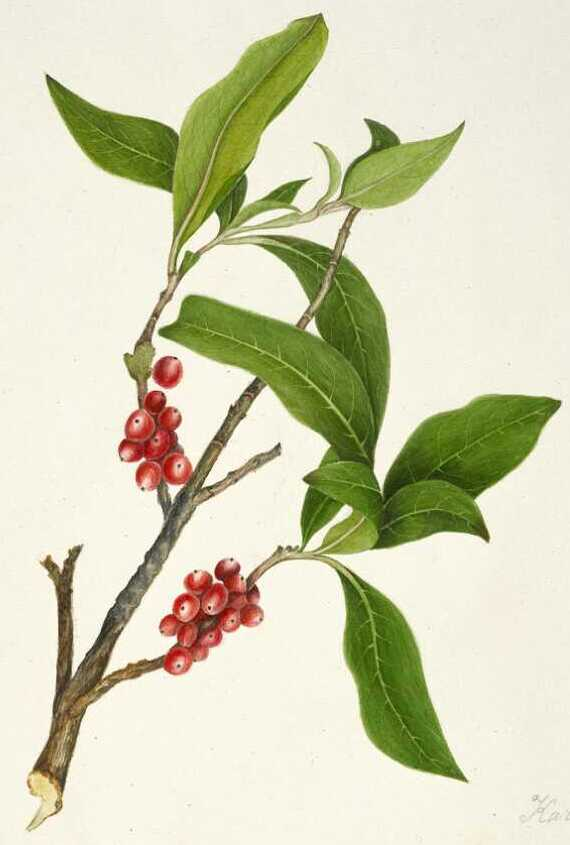
Illustration of larval host plant C. robusta.

The larval host of this moth are species in the genus Coprosma including C. autumnalis, C. macrocarpa and C. robusta.

== Behaviour ==
The larvae of A. bipartita pupate in the leaf litter at the base of their host plant or alternatively in their host plant leaves. The adults of this species are on the wing all year round but are most commonly observed from September until April. Adults are nocturnal and are attracted to light. During daylight hours adults can be observed at rest on tree trunks.

== Pests ==
A parasitoid of this moth is Meteorus pulchricornis.
