= Homadaula albida =

Scientific classification
- Kingdom: Animalia
- Phylum: Arthropoda
- Clade: Pancrustacea
- Class: Insecta
- Order: Lepidoptera
- Family: Galacticidae
- Genus: Homadaula
- Species: H. albida

Binomial name
- Homadaula albida Mey, 2004

Species of moth

Homadaula albida is a moth in the family Galacticidae. It was described by Wolfram Mey in 2004. It is found in Namibia.
