= Homadaula maritima =

Scientific classification
- Kingdom: Animalia
- Phylum: Arthropoda
- Clade: Pancrustacea
- Class: Insecta
- Order: Lepidoptera
- Family: Galacticidae
- Genus: Homadaula
- Species: H. maritima

Binomial name
- Homadaula maritima Mey, 2007

Species of moth

Homadaula maritima is a moth in the family Galacticidae. It was described by Wolfram Mey in 2007. It is found in Yemen.
