= Galactica pluripunctella =

Scientific classification
- Domain: Eukaryota
- Kingdom: Animalia
- Phylum: Arthropoda
- Class: Insecta
- Order: Lepidoptera
- Family: Galacticidae
- Genus: Galactica
- Species: G. pluripunctella

Binomial name
- Galactica pluripunctella Caradja, 1920

Species of moth

Galactica pluripunctella is a moth in the family Galacticidae. It is found in Russia.
