= Adixoana =

Scientific classification
- Kingdom: Animalia
- Phylum: Arthropoda
- Class: Insecta
- Order: Lepidoptera
- Family: Urodidae
- Genus: Adixoana; Strand, [1913]
- Species: A. auripyga

Binomial name
- Adixoana auripyga Strand, 1913

Genus of moths

Adixoana is a genus of moths in the family Urodidae containing only one species, Adixoana auripyga, which is known from Equatorial Guinea. The species was formerly included in the family Sesiidae.
