= Homadaula lasiochroa =

Scientific classification
- Domain: Eukaryota
- Kingdom: Animalia
- Phylum: Arthropoda
- Class: Insecta
- Order: Lepidoptera
- Family: Galacticidae
- Genus: Homadaula
- Species: H. lasiochroa

Binomial name
- Homadaula lasiochroa Lower, 1899

Species of moth

Homadaula lasiochroa is a moth in the family Galacticidae. It was described by Oswald Bertram Lower in 1899. It is found in Australia, where it has been recorded from New South Wales.

The wingspan is 10–12 mm. The forewings are snow white, strongly spotted throughout with black, except for the basal third of the costa. There is a well-marked elongate blackish blotch, just before the middle and nearer to the inner margin than to the costa. There is also a blackish spot in the middle of the disc at five-sixths from the base. The costa and inner margin are spotted with black, except for the basal third of the costa. The hindwings are shining greyish fuscous, becoming whitish towards the base. The apex is fuscous.
