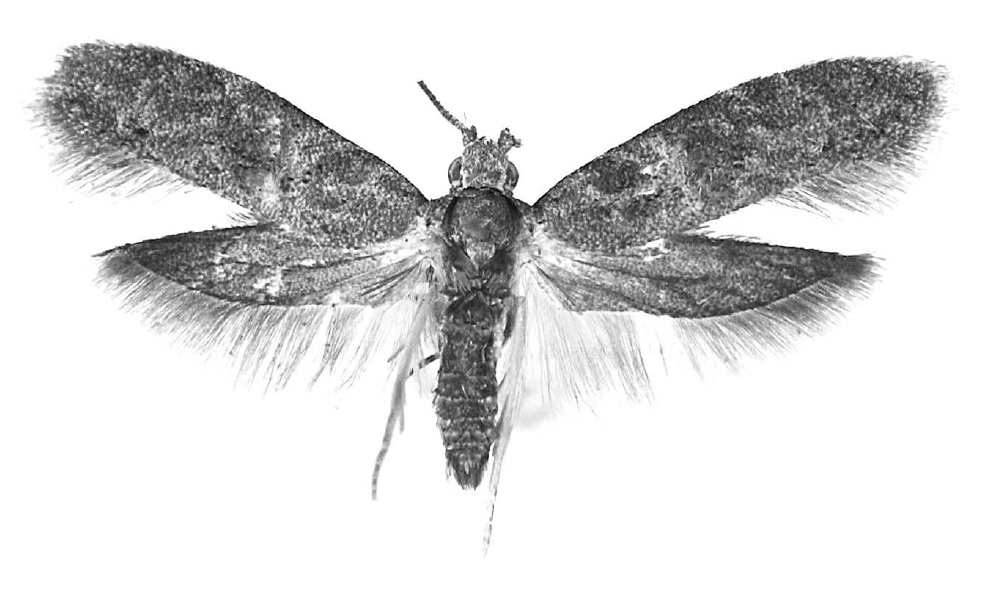
- Wockia mexicana

Scientific classification
- Kingdom: Animalia
- Phylum: Arthropoda
- Clade: Pancrustacea
- Class: Insecta
- Order: Lepidoptera
- Family: Urodidae
- Genus: Wockia; Heinemann, 1870

Synonyms
- Patula Bruand, 1851; Wockea Reutti 1898; Wockeia Spuler 1910

= Wockia =

Moth genus in family Urodidae

Wockia is a genus of moths in the family Urodidae containing around 10 described species. Individuals are small and relatively dull gray in color.

Larvae (caterpillars) are known to feed on plants in the family Salicaceae, with W. asperipunctella feeding on species of willows (Salix) and Populus, while W. chewbacca feeds on the leaves of the Casearia, albeit it avoids the veins to prevent any indigestion. The species in the Wockia genus do not have a long development time, which allows for multiple generations to occur. Specifically, the W. chewbacca takes typically two weeks to develop from egg to pupa and then another ten days in a cocoon to become an adult.

== Species ==
- Wockia asperipunctella (Bruand 1851) - Holarctic
- Wockia balikpapanella Kyrki, 1986 - Borneo
- Wockia chewbacca Adamski, 2009 - Mexico
- Wockia diabolica Sohn, 2013 - Jamaica
- Wockia koreana Sohn, 2008 - Korea
- Wockia magna Sohn, 2014 - Japan and Korea
- Wockia mexicana Adamski, 2009 - Mexico
- Wockia tetroidon Sohn, 2013 - Jamaica
- Wockia variata Sohn and Park, 2013 - Vietnam
