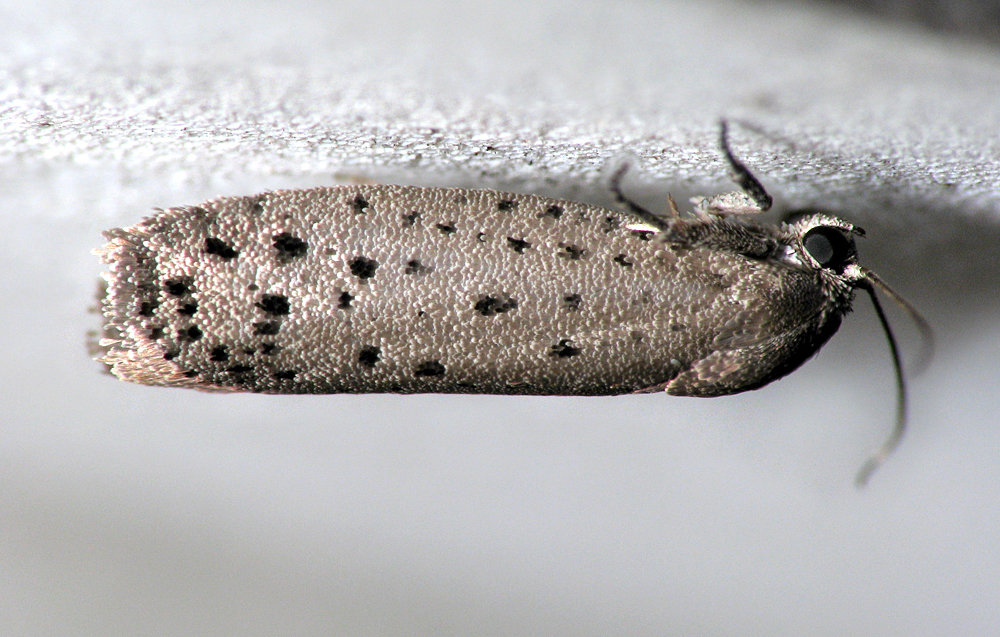

Scientific classification
- Kingdom: Animalia
- Phylum: Arthropoda
- Class: Insecta
- Order: Lepidoptera
- Family: Galacticidae
- Genus: Homadaula
- Species: H. anisocentra

Binomial name
- Homadaula anisocentra Meyrick, 1922

Synonyms
- Homadaula usuguronis Matsumura, 1931; Homadaula albizziae Clarke, 1943

= Homadaula anisocentra =

Mimosa webworm

Species of moth

Homadaula anisocentra, also known as the mimosa webworm, is a species of moth in the family Galacticidae. It is considered a pest of ornamental plants. They attack the leaves of mimosa (Albizia julibrissin) and honeylocust (Gleditsia triacanthos).

This species was introduced into the United States from China in the 1940s and likely has two generations per year in the Mid Atlantic region of the United States. The average first occurrence of larvae is after 543 growing degree-days.

== Description ==
Adults are about 10 millimetres (0.4 in) long. They are silvery gray in color and have wings covered with small, black dots. The larvae are approximately 15 mm (0.6 in) in length and are green to dark brown color. The larvae have white stripes.
