= Ustyurtia zygophyllivora =

Scientific classification
- Kingdom: Animalia
- Phylum: Arthropoda
- Clade: Pancrustacea
- Class: Insecta
- Order: Lepidoptera
- Family: Ustyurtiidae
- Genus: Ustyurtia
- Species: U. zygophyllivora

Binomial name
- Ustyurtia zygophyllivora Kaila, Heikkilä & Nupponen, 2020

Species of moth

Ustyurtia zygophyllivora is a species of moth in the family Ustyurtiidae. It was described in 2020 and is known only from the Ustyurt Nature Reserve in Kazakhstan. The species adapts to hot desert conditions and is one of only two species in its genus.
