= Homadaula myriospila =

Scientific classification
- Kingdom: Animalia
- Phylum: Arthropoda
- Class: Insecta
- Order: Lepidoptera
- Family: Galacticidae
- Genus: Homadaula
- Species: H. myriospila

Binomial name
- Homadaula myriospila Meyrick, 1907

Species of moth

Homadaula myriospila is a moth in the family Galacticidae. It was described by Edward Meyrick in 1907. It is found in Australia, where it has been recorded from Shark Bay to Cape Arid National Park in Western Australia.

The wingspan is 13–17 mm. The forewings are grey, finely irrorated (sprinkled) with white and strewn with numerous dark fuscous dots. The absence of white irroration generally forms a subquadrate blotch on the costa before the middle, its anterior edge darker and tending to be produced to the dorsum, but this is sometimes obsolete or reduced to a spot in the disc. There is a more or less distinct small dark spot above the dorsum before the tornus. The hindwings are ochreous grey, becoming darker towards the apex.
