= Homadaula coscinopa =

Scientific classification
- Domain: Eukaryota
- Kingdom: Animalia
- Phylum: Arthropoda
- Class: Insecta
- Order: Lepidoptera
- Family: Galacticidae
- Genus: Homadaula
- Species: H. coscinopa

Binomial name
- Homadaula coscinopa Lower, 1900

Species of moth

Homadaula coscinopa is a moth in the family Galacticidae. It was described by Oswald Bertram Lower in 1900. It is found in Australia, where it has been recorded from New South Wales.

The wingspan is about 14 mm. The forewings are whitish, irrorated (speckled) with small black spots, more or less arranged in transverse series, becoming more dense on the margins, leaving a basal patch of ground colour much whiter. There is an obscure elongate, somewhat cuneiform (wedge-shaped) spot of black, from the costa to the apex, reaching more than half across wing. The hindwings are fuscous, somewhat bronzy.
