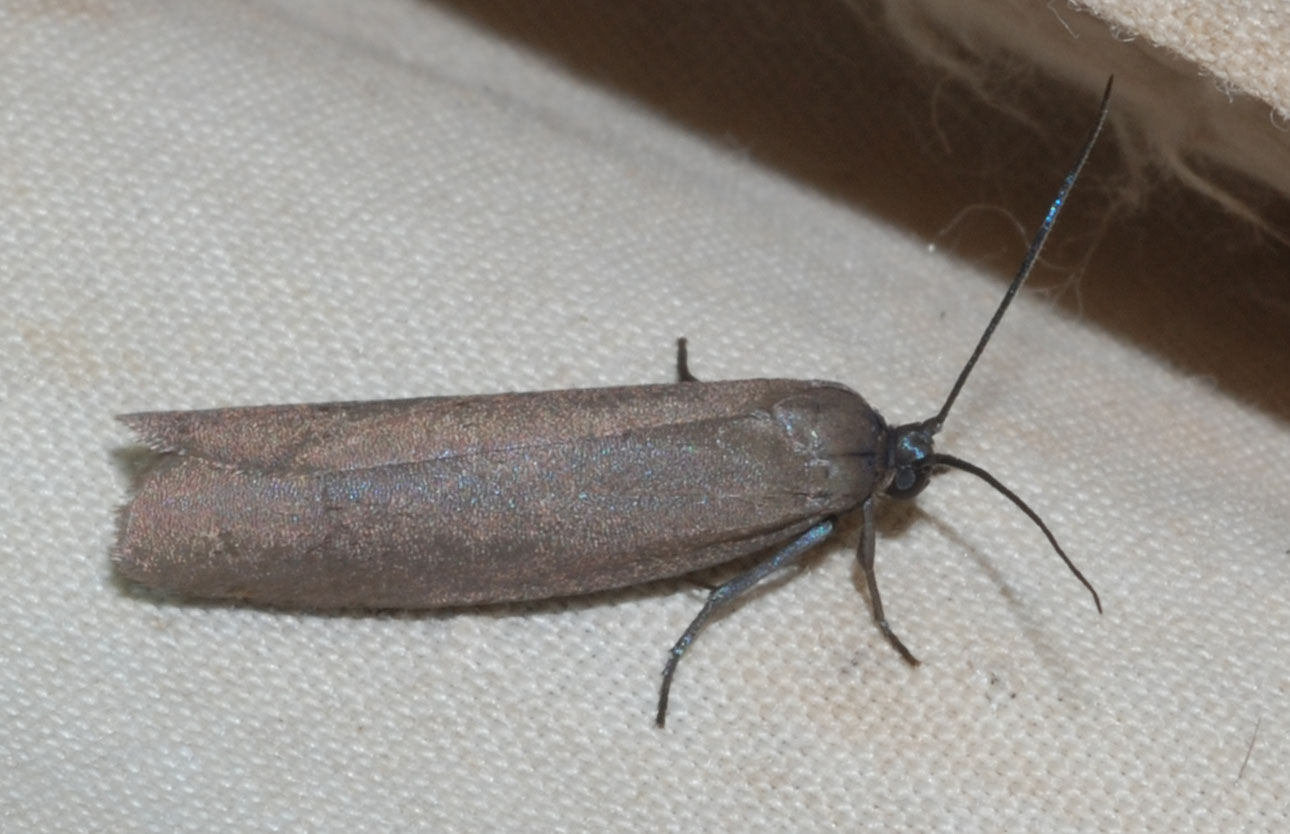
- Urodus parvula

Scientific classification
- Kingdom: Animalia
- Phylum: Arthropoda
- Class: Insecta
- Order: Lepidoptera
- Family: Urodidae
- Genus: Urodus; Herrich-Schäffer, 1854

Type species
- Urodus monura Herrich-Schäffer, 1854

Synonyms
- Trichostibas Zeller, 1863; Paratiquadra Walsingham, 1897

= Urodus =

Genus of moths

Urodus is a genus of moths in the family Urodidae.

== Species ==
- Urodus amphilocha Meyrick, 1923
- Urodus aphanoptis Meyrick, 1930
- Urodus aphrogama Meyrick, 1936 (from Rio Grande do Sul, Brazil)
- Urodus auchmera Walsingham, 1914
- Urodus brachyanches Meyrick, 1931
- Urodus calligera Zeller, 1877
- Urodus carabopa Meyrick, 1925
- Urodus chiquita Busck, 1910
- Urodus chrysoconis Meyrick, 1932
- Urodus costaricae Busck, 1910
- Urodus cumulata Walsingham, 1914
- Urodus cyanombra Meyrick, 1913
- Urodus cyclopica Meyrick, 1930
- Urodus decens Meyrick, 1925
- Urodus distincta Strand, 1911
- Urodus favigera Meyrick, 1913
- Urodus fonteboae Strand, 1911
- Urodus forficulella (Walsingham, 1897) (originally in Paratiquadra)
- Urodus fulminalis Meyrick, 1931
- Urodus fumosa (Zeller, 1863) (originally in Trichostibas)
- Urodus hephaestiella (Zeller, 1877)
- Urodus hexacentris Meyrick, 1931
- Urodus imitans Felder, 1875
- Urodus imitata Druce, 1884 (from Guademala)
- Urodus iophlebia Zeller, 1877
- Urodus isoxesta Meyrick, 1932
- Urodus isthmiella Busck, 1910
- ?Urodus lissopeda (Meyrick, 1932) (originally in Pygmocrates)
- Urodus lithophaea Meyrick, 1913
- Urodus marantica Walsingham, 1914
- Urodus merida Strand, 1911
- Urodus mirella (Möschler, 1890) (originally in Pexicnemidia)
- Urodus modesta Druce, 1884 (from Guatemala)
- Urodus monura Herrich-Schäffer, [1854] (from Venezuela)
- Urodus niphatma Meyrick, 1925
- Urodus opticosema Meyrick, 1930
- Urodus ovata Zeller, 1877
- Urodus pallidicostella Walsingham, 1897
- Urodus pamporphyra Meyrick, 1936 (from Rio Grande do Sul, Brazil)
- Urodus parvula Edwards, 1881 (from the USA)
- Urodus perischias Meyrick, 1925
- Urodus porphyrina Meyrick, 1932
- Urodus praetextata Meyrick, 1913
- Urodus procridias Meyrick, 1936 (from Rio Grande do Sul, Brazil)
- Urodus pulvinata Meyrick, 1923
- Urodus sanctipaulensis Strand, 1911
- Urodus scythrochalca Meyrick, 1932
- Urodus sordidata Zeller, 1877
- Urodus spumescens Meyrick, 1925
- Urodus staphylina Meyrick, 1932
- Urodus subcaerulea Dognin, 1910
- Urodus sympiestis Meyrick, 1925
- Urodus tineiformis (Walker, 1856) (originally in Aperla)
- Urodus transverseguttata Zeller, 1877
- Urodus triancycla Meyrick, 1931
- Urodus venatella Busck, 1910
- Urodus xiphura Meyrick, 1931
