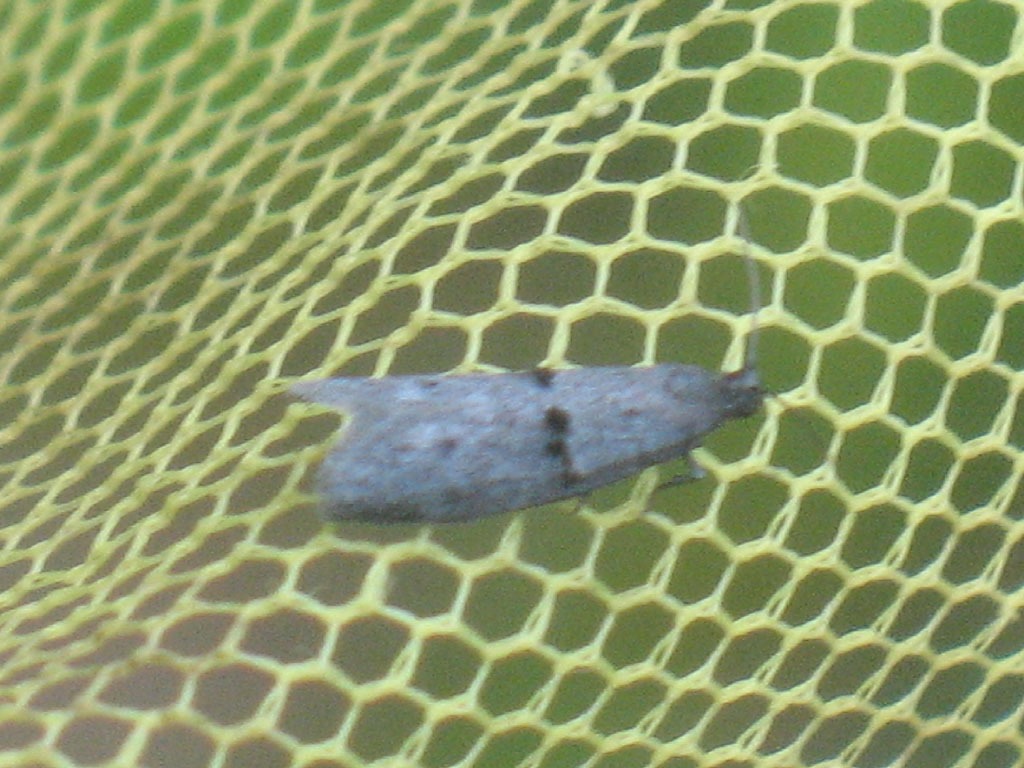

Scientific classification
- Kingdom: Animalia
- Phylum: Arthropoda
- Class: Insecta
- Order: Lepidoptera
- Family: Urodidae
- Genus: Wockia
- Species: W. asperipunctella

Binomial name
- Wockia asperipunctella (Bruand, 1851)

Synonyms
- Patula asperipunctella Bruand, 1850; Wockia funebrella Heinemann, 1870

= Wockia asperipunctella =

Species of moth

Wockia asperipunctella is a species of moth, belonging to the genus Wockia.

It is native to Europe and Northern America.
