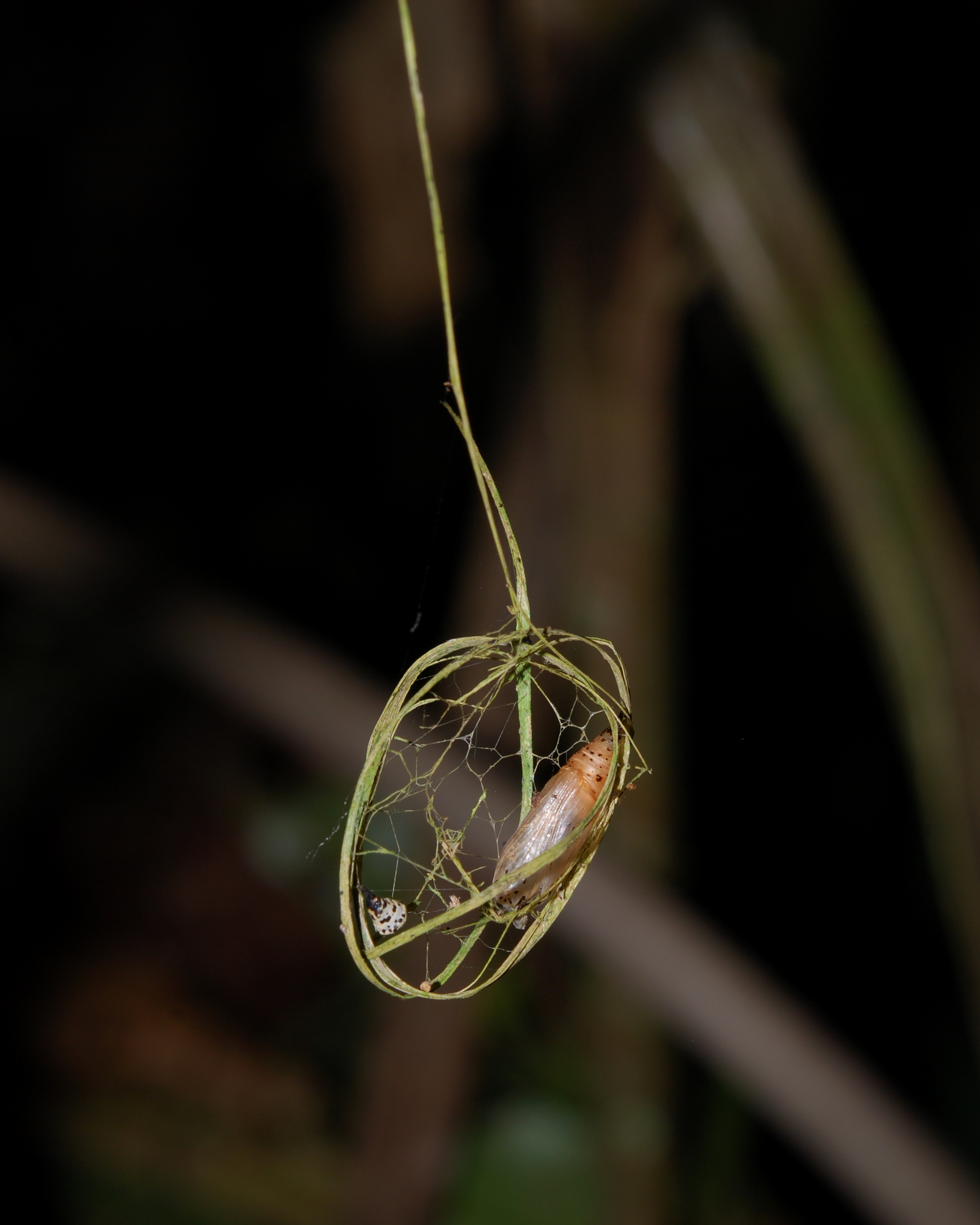
- Urodidae

Scientific classification
- Domain: Eukaryota
- Kingdom: Animalia
- Phylum: Arthropoda
- Class: Insecta
- Order: Lepidoptera
- Clade: Apoditrysia
- Superfamily: Urodoidea; Kyrki, 1988

Families
- Urodidae; Ustyurtiidae

= Urodoidea =

Superfamily of moths

Urodoidea is a superfamily of moths in the clade Apoditrysia. It currently contains two families: Urodidae and Ustyurtiidae.
