= Geoesthia =

Scientific classification
- Kingdom: Animalia
- Phylum: Arthropoda
- Class: Insecta
- Order: Lepidoptera
- Family: Urodidae
- Genus: Geoesthia
- Species: G. ceylonica

Binomial name
- Geoesthia ceylonica Sohn, 2014

Monotypic moth genus in family Urodidae

Geoesthia is a monotypic moth genus in the family Urodidae first described by Jay Sohn in 2014. Its only species, Geoesthia ceylonica, was described in the same paper. It is only known from Sri Lanka.

This species is the only second urodid moth found from Oriental region. It is characterized by lack of scale tufts on the labial palp, absence of raised scales of two subbasal spots on the forewings, five signa within female corpus bursae and presence of M-stem on the hindwings.
