= Homadaula poliodes =

Scientific classification
- Kingdom: Animalia
- Phylum: Arthropoda
- Class: Insecta
- Order: Lepidoptera
- Family: Galacticidae
- Genus: Homadaula
- Species: H. poliodes

Binomial name
- Homadaula poliodes Meyrick, 1907

Species of moth

Homadaula poliodes is a moth in the family Galacticidae. It was described by Edward Meyrick in 1907. It is found in Australia, where it has been recorded from Western Australia.

The wingspan is 11–12 mm. The forewings are grey, densely and suffusedly irrorated (sprinkled) with white and with some scattered rather dark fuscous dots. The markings are rather dark fuscous, consisting of a triangular spot on the dorsum near the base, a moderately broad fascia at one-third, attenuated or obsolete on the costa, as well as an irregular blotch on the dorsum before the tornus and an irregular spot on the costa at three-fourths, and another on the termen above the tornus. The hindwings are rather dark grey, but lighter towards base.
