= Tanaoctena =

Scientific classification
- Domain: Eukaryota
- Kingdom: Animalia
- Phylum: Arthropoda
- Class: Insecta
- Order: Lepidoptera
- Family: Galacticidae
- Genus: Tanaoctena; Turner, 1913

Species
- See text

Synonyms
- Nesotropha Turner, 1926; Cylicophora Turner, 1927

Genus of moths

Tanaoctena is a genus of moths of the family Galacticidae.

== Species ==
- Tanaoctena dubia - Philpott, 1931
- Tanaoctena indubitata - Clarke, 1971
- Tanaoctena ooptila - Turner, 1913
- Tanaoctena pygmaeodes - (Turner, 1926)

== Former species ==
- Tanaoctena collina - Turner, 1926
