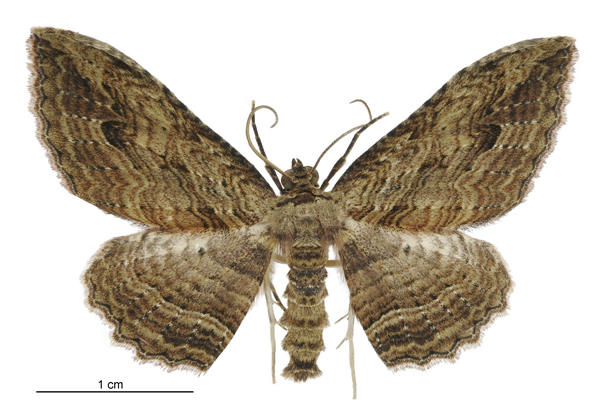
- Male
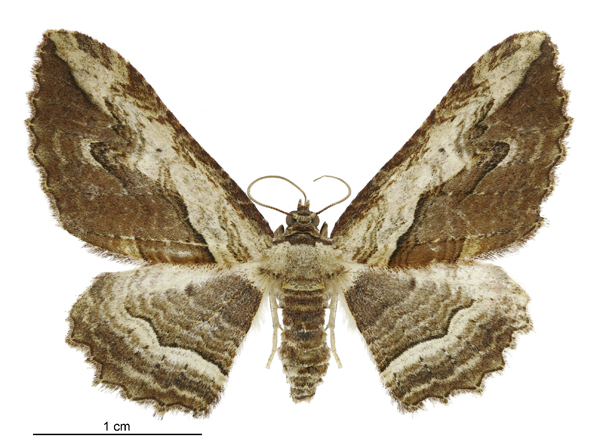
- Female

Scientific classification
- Kingdom: Animalia
- Phylum: Arthropoda
- Clade: Pancrustacea
- Class: Insecta
- Order: Lepidoptera
- Family: Geometridae
- Genus: Austrocidaria
- Species: A. anguligera

Binomial name
- Austrocidaria anguligera (Butler, 1879)

Synonyms
- Phibalapteryx anguligera Butler, 1879; Eucymatoge anguligera (Butler, 1897)

= Austrocidaria anguligera =

Species of moth

Austrocidaria anguligera is a species of moth in the family Geometridae. It is endemic to New Zealand. It is regarded as being uncommon but is frequently confused with Austrocidaria bipartita.

== Taxonomy ==
This species was first described by Arthur Gardiner Butler in 1879 using specimens collected by Frederick Hutton in Dunedin and given the name Phibalapteryx anguligera. George Vernon Hudson discussed and illustrated this species in his 1898 book as a synonym of Hydriomena gobiata. In his 1928 publication The Butterflies and Moths of New Zealand Hudson again illustrated and discussed the species, but under the name Eucymatoge anguligera following Edward Meyrick's placement of the species within that genus. In 1988 John S. Dugdale assigned the species to a new genus Austrocidaria. The holotype specimen is held at the Natural History Museum, London.

== Description ==
Butler described the adult moths of the species as follows:

♀ More sandy in coloration than P. gobiata, with a distinct oblique olivaceous brown central belt, limited by the discal blackish line, which is widely zigzag, but diverging from this line above the lower radial, whence it runs transversely but irregularly to the costal margin; a large dusky discocellular spot; veins on the disc white dotted with black as usual; secondaries with the margin rather more strongly dentated than in P. gohiata, the inner blackish line represented by a grey band; outer border limited by a dusky line; a slender black marginal line; primaries below with a lakey tint; the discocellular dot black; a transverse irregular discal line answering to that of the upper surface; secondaries pale sandy-whitish, the basal half crossed by five dusky lines; disc crossed by a darker sandy nebula. Expanse of wings 1 inch 4 lines.

A. anguligera is sometimes confused with A. bipartita, with the latter being the more common species.

== Distribution ==
This species is endemic to New Zealand. It has been found in Canterbury, Otago, Invercargill, and Otira in the South Island, as well as in Auckland and Wellington in the North Island.

== Biology and behaviour ==
The adults of this species are on the wing from September to March. They can be found resting on tree trunks or fence posts during the day.

== Habitat and host species ==
This species prefers scrubby forest habitat. It occurs in a variety of ecosystems from montane to coastal. The larvae of this moth feeds on Coprosma species. Meyrick noted that the adults of this species could be found on the flowers of Senecio species. Hudson stated that the adult moths fed on the flowers of Veronica salicifolia.
