= Urodus aphrogama =

Scientific classification
- Kingdom: Animalia
- Phylum: Arthropoda
- Class: Insecta
- Order: Lepidoptera
- Family: Urodidae
- Genus: Urodus
- Species: U. aphrogama

Binomial name
- Urodus aphrogama Meyrick, 1936

Species of moth

Urodus aphrogama is a species of moth from Brazil. It has a wingspan of 24–26 mm and its forewings are dark fuscous with three pairs of small very obscure suffused whitish spots in disc.
