= Tanaoctena pygmaeodes =

Scientific classification
- Domain: Eukaryota
- Kingdom: Animalia
- Phylum: Arthropoda
- Class: Insecta
- Order: Lepidoptera
- Family: Galacticidae
- Genus: Tanaoctena
- Species: T. pygmaeodes

Binomial name
- Tanaoctena pygmaeodes (Turner, 1926)

Synonyms
- Nesotropha pygmaeodes Turner, 1926; Cylicophora collina Turner, 1927

Species of moth

Tanaoctena pygmaeodes is a moth in the family Galacticidae. It was described by Turner in 1926. It is found in Australia, where it has been recorded from Tasmania.

The wingspan is 14–16 mm. The forewings are fuscous with variably developed white transverse strigulae. These combine to form two fasciae, the first antemedian, moderately broad, outwardly curved, its outer edge angled above the middle. The second is ill-defined and broad on the costa from the middle to three-fourths, narrowing to a point at the tornus. There is some irregular ochreous irroration and there are two dark fuscous discal dots in the fasciae, the first beyond one-third, the second at two-thirds. There are also some ochreous-whitish terminal dots. The hindwings are fuscous.
