= Tanaoctena ooptila =

Scientific classification
- Domain: Eukaryota
- Kingdom: Animalia
- Phylum: Arthropoda
- Class: Insecta
- Order: Lepidoptera
- Family: Galacticidae
- Genus: Tanaoctena
- Species: T. ooptila

Binomial name
- Tanaoctena ooptila Turner, 1913

Species of moth

Tanaoctena ooptila is a moth in the family Galacticidae. It was described by Turner in 1913. It is found in Australia, where it has been recorded from Queensland.

The wingspan is 14–16 mm. The forewings are ochreous-whitish, with irregular fuscous suffusion which tends to form transverse lines. There is a dark fuscous median discal dot at one-third, and a second before two-thirds. There are two closely approximated lines from the costa at one-fourth, diverging in the disc, the first inwardly curved to one-fourth of the dorsum, the second outwardly to the mid-dorsum. There is a pale area around the first discal dot and there are two suffused lines between this and the second dot. The hindwings are whitish.
