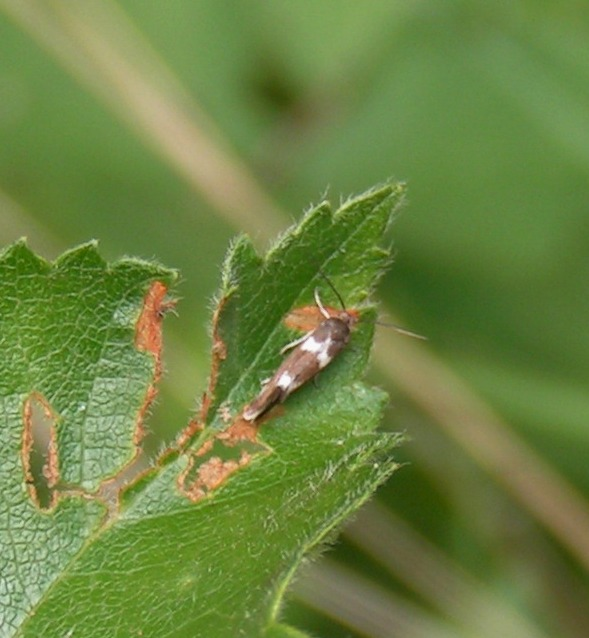

Scientific classification
- Kingdom: Animalia
- Phylum: Arthropoda
- Clade: Pancrustacea
- Class: Insecta
- Order: Lepidoptera
- Family: Plutellidae
- Genus: Atemelia
- Species: A. torquatella

Binomial name
- Atemelia torquatella Lienig & Zeller, 1846

= Atemelia torquatella =

Species of moth

Atemelia torquatella is a species of moth belonging to the family Plutellidae first described by Friederike Lienig and Philipp Christoph Zeller in 1846.

It is native to Europe.
