= Atemelia =

Scientific classification
- Kingdom: Animalia
- Phylum: Arthropoda
- Class: Insecta
- Order: Lepidoptera
- Family: Plutellidae
- Genus: Atemelia; Herrich-Schäffer, 1853

Species
- See text

Genus of moths

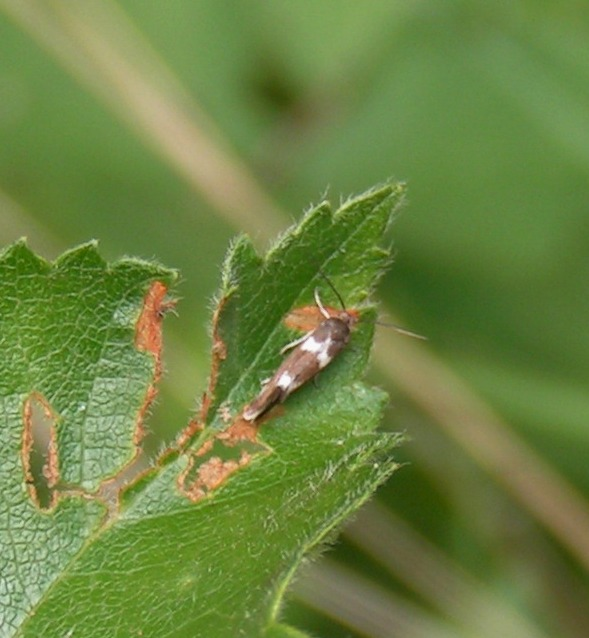
Atemelia torquatella

Atemelia is a genus of moths of the family Plutellidae.

== Species ==
- Atemelia casimiroae Sohn et Epstein 2019
- Atemelia compressella - Herrich-Schäffer, 1855
- Atemelia contrariella - Zeller, 1877
- Atemelia iridesma - Meyrick, 1930
- Atemelia mahonivora Sohn et Peralta 2014
- Atemelia torquatella - Lienig, 1846
