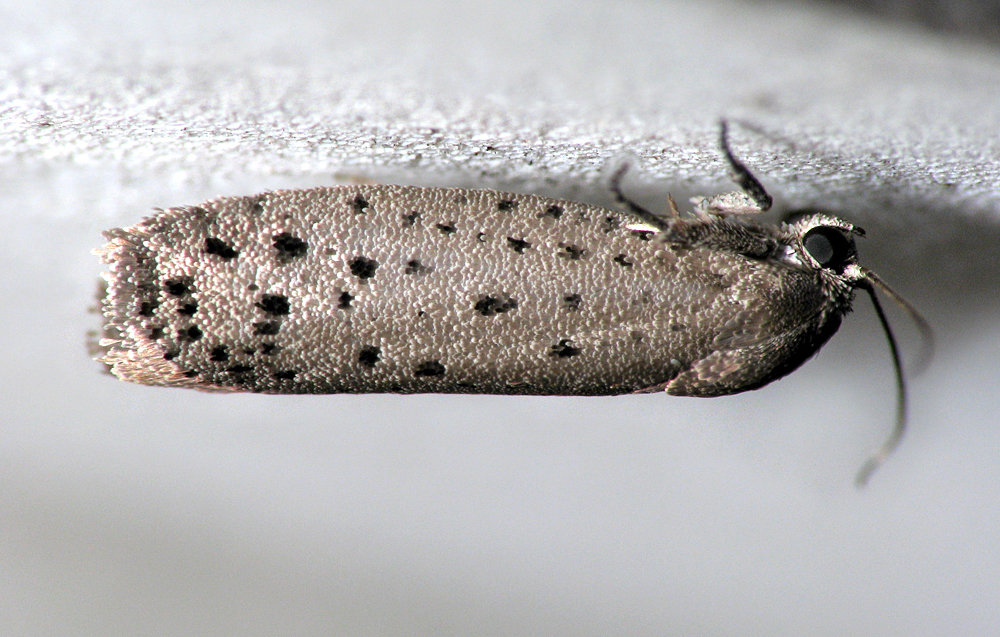
- Mimosa Webworm Moth, Homadaula anisocentra.

Scientific classification
- Domain: Eukaryota
- Kingdom: Animalia
- Phylum: Arthropoda
- Class: Insecta
- Order: Lepidoptera
- Family: Galacticidae
- Genus: Homadaula; Lower, 1899

Synonyms
- Paraprays Rebel, 1910; Stichotactis Meyrick, 1930

= Homadaula =

Genus of moths

Homadaula is a genus of moths in the family Galacticidae.

== Selected species ==
- Homadaula albida Mey, 2004
- Homadaula anisocentra Meyrick, 1922
- Homadaula calamitosa (Meyrick, 1930)
- Homadaula coscinopa Lower, 1900
- Homadaula dispertita Meyrick, 1922
- Homadaula lasiochroa Lower, 1899
- Homadaula maritima Mey, 2007
- Homadaula montana Mey, 2007
- Homadaula myriospila Meyrick, 1907
- Homadaula poliodes Meyrick, 1907
- Homadaula punctigera (Rebel, 1910)
- Homadaula ravula Mey, 2004
- Homadaula submontana Mey, 2007
- Homadaula watamomaritima Mey, 2007
- Homadaula wieseri Mey, 2011
