= Ustyurtia =

Scientific classification
- Kingdom: Animalia
- Phylum: Arthropoda
- Clade: Pancrustacea
- Class: Insecta
- Order: Lepidoptera
- Family: Ustyurtiidae; Kaila, Heikkilä & Nupponen, 2020
- Genus: Ustyurtia; Kaila, Heikkilä & Nupponen, 2020

Genus of moths

Ustyurtia is the sole genus of moths in the monotypic family Ustyurtiidae.

The species of this genus are found in Kazakhstan.

Species:

- Ustyurtia zygophyllivora Kaila, Heikkilä & Nupponen, 2020
- Ustyurtia charynica Kaila, Heikkilä & Nupponen, 2020
