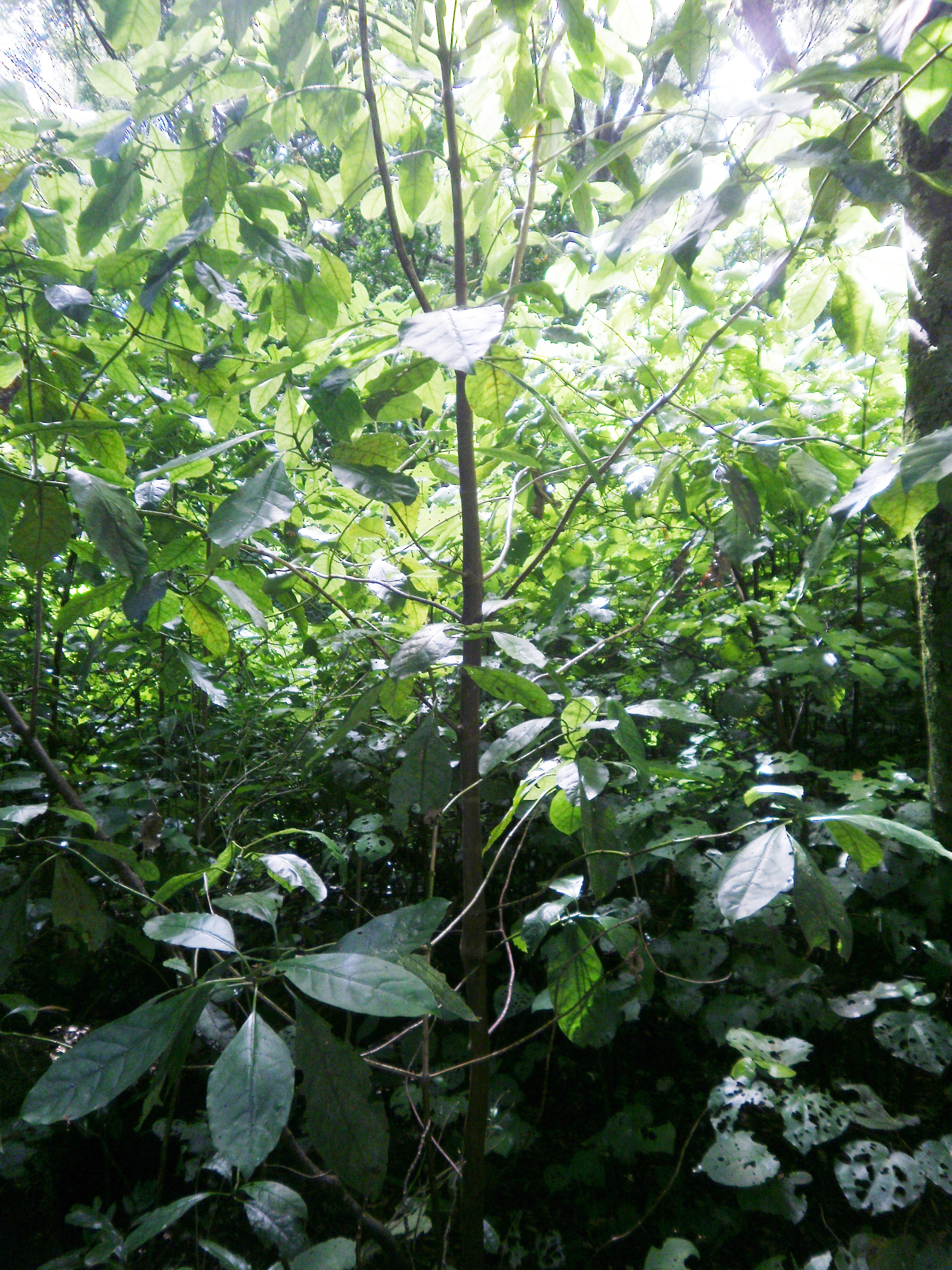

Scientific classification
- Kingdom: Plantae
- Clade: Tracheophytes
- Clade: Angiosperms
- Clade: Eudicots
- Clade: Asterids
- Order: Gentianales
- Family: Rubiaceae
- Genus: Coprosma
- Species: C. autumnalis

Binomial name
- Coprosma autumnalis Colenso

= Coprosma autumnalis =

Species of plant

Coprosma autumnalis or C. grandifolia according to earlier Colenso authority, (In Māori: kanono, raurēkau or kawariki) is a native forest shrub of New Zealand. It is widespread in both the North Island and in the northern South Island, and has the largest leaves of any New Zealand coprosma. The name kawariki was applied after its leaves resembling those of the tropical Terminalia catappa which was once planted as shade for noble chiefs (ariki).

Kanono is found in wet and shaded forest areas where it can grow to 6 metres high, with a slender trunk and stout branches. Leaves grow up to 15 cm long with 2 cm or longer stalks.

Kanono produces ripe orange fruit between February and May, then flowers around April.

Māori have used the bark to produce a yellow colour for dyeing flax fibre.

C. autumnalis is more commonly known by its earlier name Coprosma grandifolia
