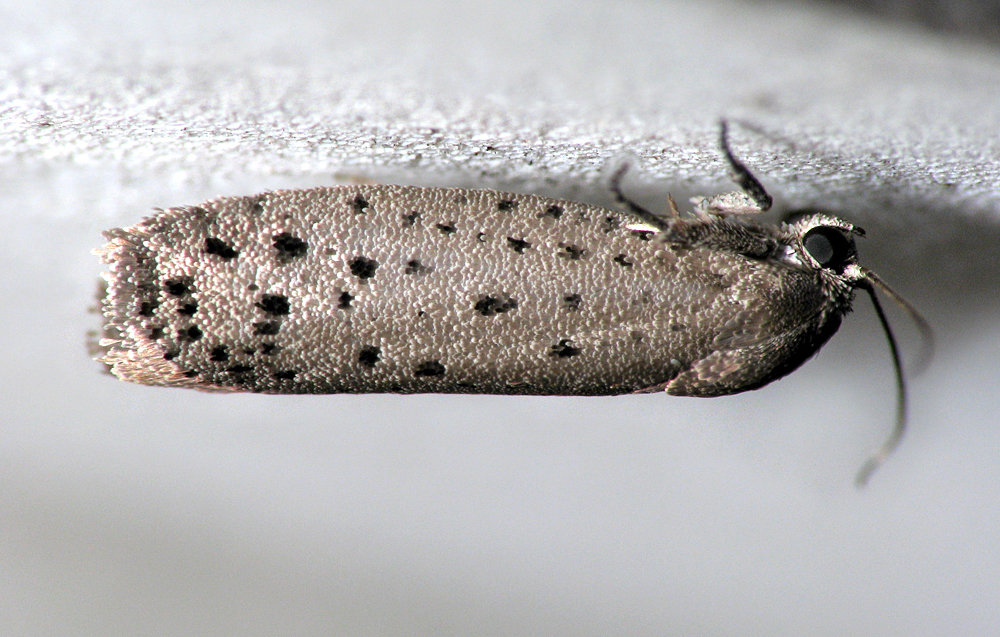
- Homadaula anisocentra

Scientific classification
- Kingdom: Animalia
- Phylum: Arthropoda
- Clade: Pancrustacea
- Class: Insecta
- Order: Lepidoptera
- Infraorder: Heteroneura
- Clade: Eulepidoptera
- Clade: Ditrysia
- Clade: Apoditrysia
- Superfamily: Galacticoidea; Minet, 1986
- Family: Galacticidae; Minet, 1986

Genera
- Galactica Walsingham, 1911; Homadaula Lower, 1899 ?Tanaoctena Turner, 1913

Diversity
- About 33 species

= Galacticidae =

Family of moths

Galacticidae is a recently recognised and enigmatic family of insects in the lepidopteran order. These moderate sized moths are 8–17 mm in wingspan and have previously been embedded within several lepidopteran superfamilies (Tineoidea: Psychidae, Urodoidea, Sesioidea and in several families of Yponomeutoidea), but Galacticidae is currently placed in its own superfamily at the base of the natural group Apoditrysia (Dugdale et al., 1999 [1998]; May, 2004).

Note: the superfamily was unintentionally called "Galaticoidea" in Dugdale et al. (1999) [1998].

The relationships of Galacticidae need reassessment with new characters including DNA data. The genus Homadaula looks remarkably like the yponomeutid genera Prays and Atemelia and some species are reminiscent of "small ermine" moths. Despite the spined abdominal segments of the pupae and a few other characters (Minet, 1986) some possess structural similarities to yponomeutids as well and have similar larval behaviour so their removal from the Yponomeutoidea has been questioned (Mey, 2004).

The family is distributed in the Old World from Africa and Madagascar to Asia, Australia and New Caledonia. The richest genus is Homadaula with eight species. The mimosa webworm (Homadaula anisocentra) is a pest of ornamental plants, which has been introduced to eastern North America (Moriuti, 1963; Dugdale et al., 1999).
