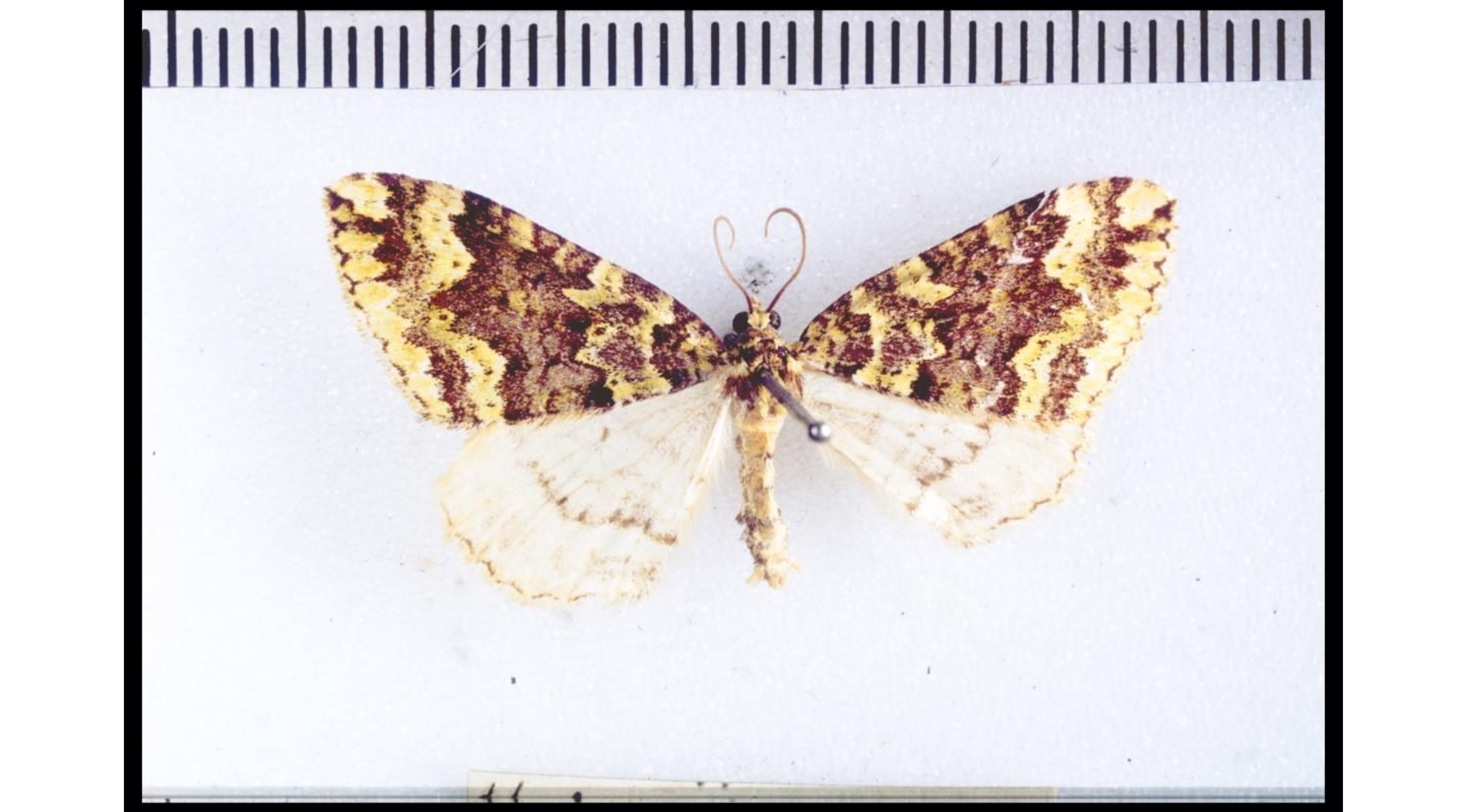
- Holotype specimen

Scientific classification
- Kingdom: Animalia
- Phylum: Arthropoda
- Clade: Pancrustacea
- Class: Insecta
- Order: Lepidoptera
- Family: Geometridae
- Genus: Austrocidaria
- Species: A. praerupta

Binomial name
- Austrocidaria praerupta (Philpott, 1918)

Synonyms
- Hydriomena praerupta Philpott, 1918

= Austrocidaria praerupta =

Species of moth endemic to New Zealand

Austrocidaria praerupta, also known as the mountain Coprosma carpet moth, is a species of moth of the family Geometridae. It endemic to New Zealand and is found in the South Island. This moth is associated with plant species in the genus Coprosma and adults are on the wing in November and December.

== Taxonomy ==
This species was first described by Alfred Philpott in 1918 using a specimen collected on Mount Cleughearn in the Hunter Mountains in Fiordland. Philpott originally named this species Hydriomena praerupta. In 1928 George Hudson discussed this species as a synonym of Hydriomena callichlora. Later in 1928 Philpott disagreed with this synonymisation and discussed this species under the name H. praerupta. In 1943 W. George Howes agreed with Philpott that H. praerupta should be treated as a distinct species. Hudson subsequently accepted this in his 1950 publication. Despite this the taxonomic status of this species is still in doubt and requires further investigation. In 1971 John S. Dugdale placed this species in the genus Austrocidaria. The male holotype specimen is held in the New Zealand Arthropod Collection.

== Description ==
Philpott described this species as follows:

♂. 33-34 mm. Head yellowish-green. Palpi yellowish-green mixed with brown. Antennae brown, ochreous-tinged. Thorax yellowish-green mixed with black. Abdomen ochreous. Legs ochreous-grey, more or less infuscated. Forewings triangular, costa moderately arched, apex obtuse, termen slightly bowed; yellowish-green : markings dark olive-green; a curved irregular band near base, preceded by an obscure line; space between basal and median bands pale ground-colour with suffused dark median area; median band broad, anterior margin curved, with strong indentations above and below middle, posterior margin irregularly curved, with strong bidentate projection at middle; subterminal line greenish-white, subdentate, broadlv margined anteriorly with dark suffusion which almost touches projection of median band, thus nearly interrupting the stripe of pale ground-colour; an oblique dark striga from below apex to terminal line, deliminating a pale subtriangular apical patch; a crenate blackish terminal line: cilia yellowish-green with some dark scales. Hindwings grey-whitish : a waved fuscous median line and several similar but imperfect preceding and following lines; a thin blackish crenate line on termen : cilia ochreous-grey.

Philpott points out that this species is very similar in appearance to Hydriomena callichlora but at it can be distinguished by the pale apical area, the more dentate subterminal line, and the stronger projection of the posterior margin of the median band on its forewings.

== Distribution ==
This species is endemic to New Zealand and has been observed in the South Island.

== Habitat and hosts ==
This species is associated with plants in the genus Coprosma.

== Behaviour ==
Adults have been observed on the wing in November and December.
