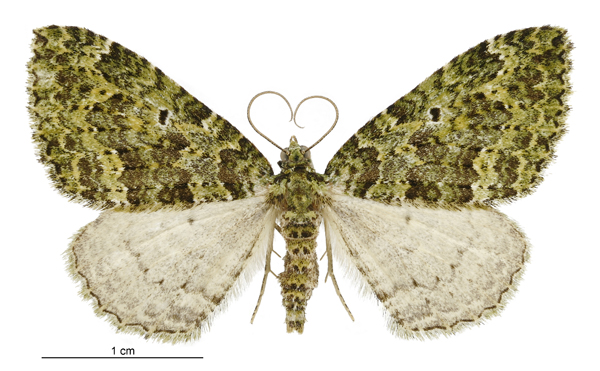
- Female
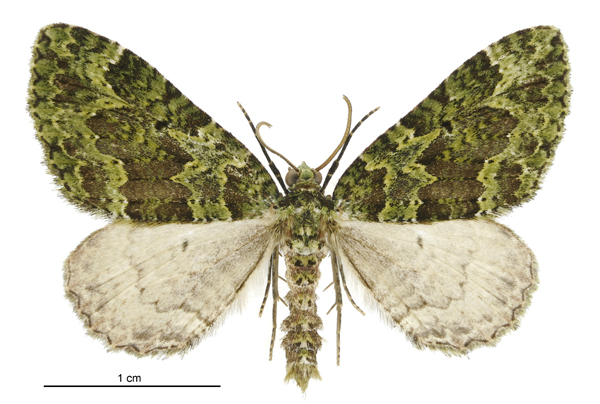
- Male

Scientific classification
- Kingdom: Animalia
- Phylum: Arthropoda
- Class: Insecta
- Order: Lepidoptera
- Family: Geometridae
- Genus: Austrocidaria
- Species: A. callichlora

Binomial name
- Austrocidaria callichlora (Butler, 1879)

Synonyms
- Cidaria callichlora Butler, 1879; Hydriomena callichlora harmonica Clarke, 1926

= Austrocidaria callichlora =

Species of moth endemic to New Zealand

Austrocidaria callichlora, also known as the green Coprosma carpet moth, is a species of moth of the family Geometridae. It endemic to New Zealand. This species is found in both the North and South Islands where it inhabits native shrubland and forest as well as tussock. Larvae feed on Coprosma species.

== Taxonomy ==
It was first described by Arthur Gardiner Butler in 1879 using specimens collected in the Wairarapa and named Cidaria callichlora. George Hudson described and illustrated this species under the name Hydriomena callichlora in both his 1898 book New Zealand moths and butterflies (Macro-lepidoptera) and his 1928 book The butterflies and moths of New Zealand. In 1926 Charles E. Clarke described a new subspecies of this species Hydriomena callichlora harmonica. Hudson synonymised this subspecies in his 1928 publication. J. S. Dugdale placed this species in the genus Austrocidaria in 1971. The male holotype of this species was collected in Dunedin by F. W. Hutton and is held at that Natural History Museum, London.

== Description ==
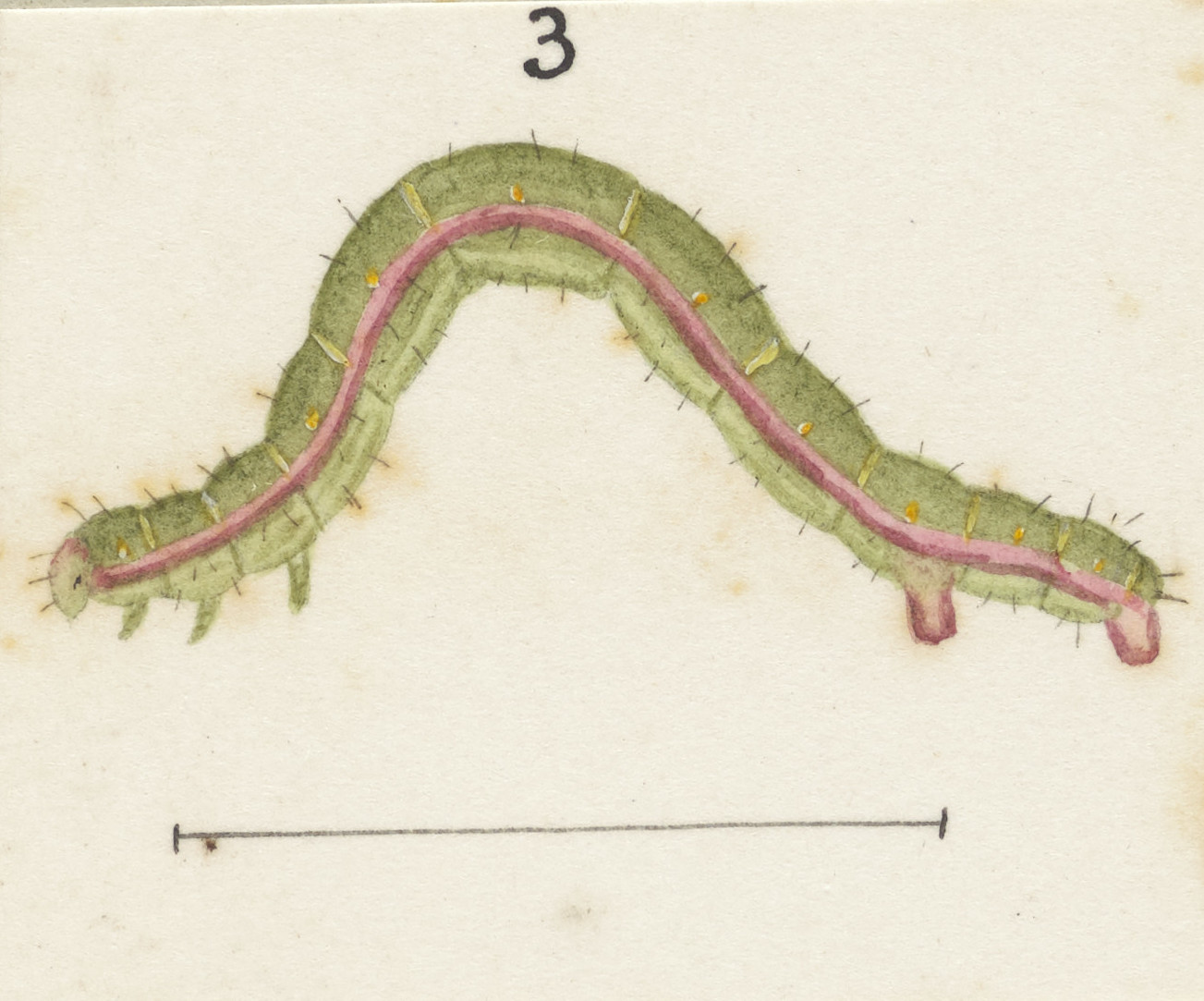
Illustration of larvae

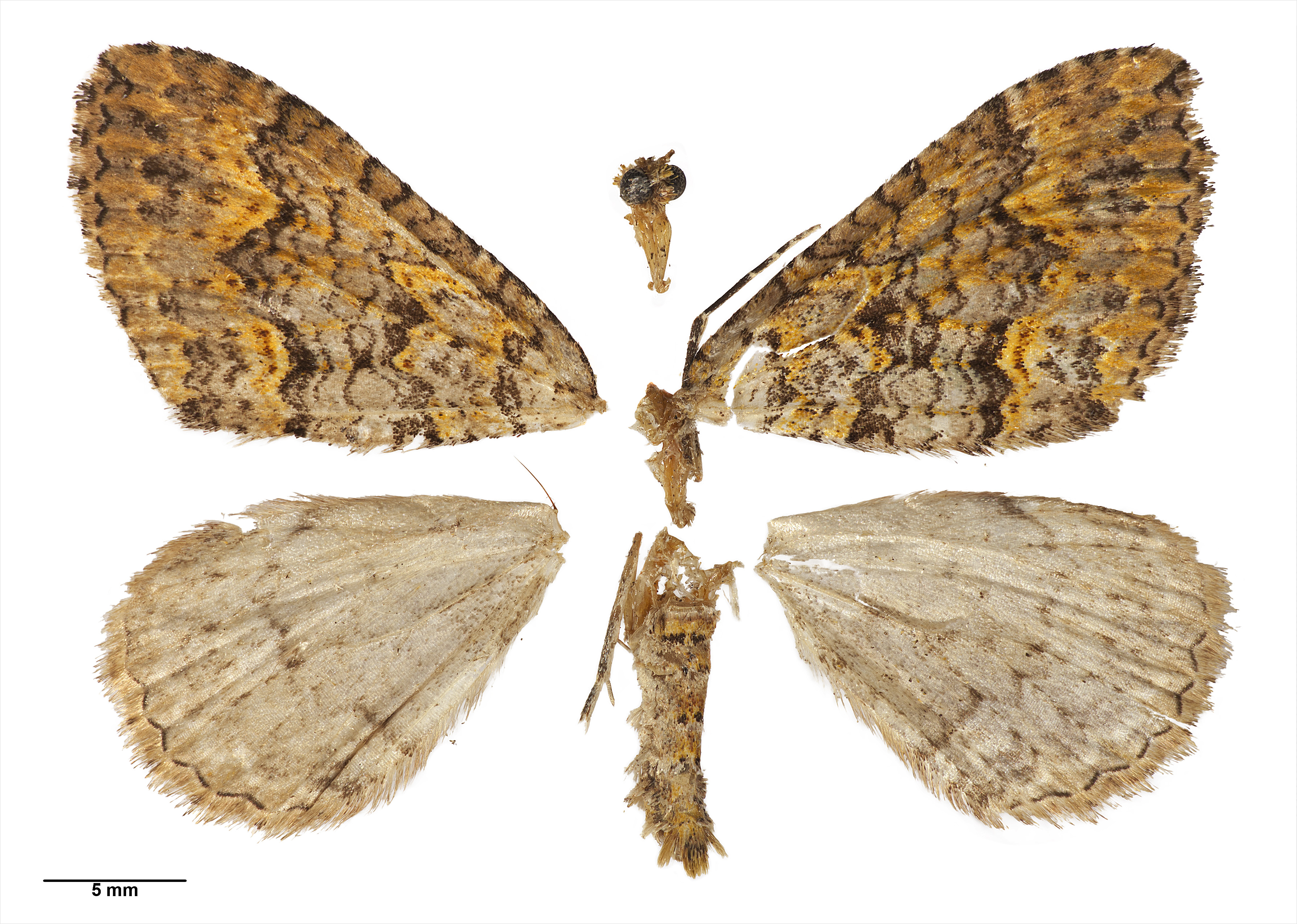
Male holotype of A. callichlora.

Hudson described the larvae and pupae of this species as follows:

The very handsome larva, which feeds on Coprosma rotundifolia, during the summer months, is about 1 inch in length, moderately slender, slightly flattened and of almost uniform thickness; very bright green much paler on the

ventral surface; there is a conspicuous crimson lateral line sometimes edged with white and the prolegs are also crimson; the segmental divisions are marked in yellow, and there are a few isolated black bristles. Younger larvae have the ground colour dull greyish-green, whitish underneath, and the crimson stripe is much fainter than in the full-grown larva.

The pupa is enclosed in a fragile cocoon composed of several leaves joined together with silk and usually situated on the surface of the ground.

When first describing this species and naming it Cidaria callichlora, Butler said the following:

Nearly allied to the European C. miata, from which it differs as follows: primaries above more densely green; basal patch smaller and darker, not so angular; central belt wider, its inner edge not so sharply defined, its outer edge widely zigzag from above the second median branch; the white submarginal spots replaced by a pale greenish festooned line; the double marginal black dots replaced by <-shaped markings; secondaries crossed by two widely separated indistinct dentate-simuate grey discal lines; no discocellular dot; abdomen pale brown with white dorsal dots on each side of which are black dots; below there are similar differences, but here all the wings exhibit black discocellular dots. Expanse of wings 1 inch 3 lines.

This species is similar in appearance to A. similata but lacks the purple-grey coloured mark where the forewings meet in that latter species. This species is also visually similar to Austrocidaria praerupta with George Hudson mistakenly discussing A. praerupta as a synonym of A. callichlora. The wingspan of adults is between 24 and 34 mm. Adults are variable in wing colouration. Some specimens sourced from Fiordland being particularly intensely coloured, with some featuring shades of blue and green on their wings.

== Distribution ==
A. callichlora is endemic to New Zealand and can be found on both the North and South Islands.

== Behaviour ==
The adult of the species is on the wing from November to March. Adults have been observed resting on mossy tree-trunks with forewings folded back and their abdomen pointing upwards. Hudson pointed out that this resting position along with the crests on the thorax ensures the insect mimics a patch of moss. Hudson hypothesised that this species spends the winter months either hibernating as full grown larvae or as a pupa.

== Habitat and hosts ==
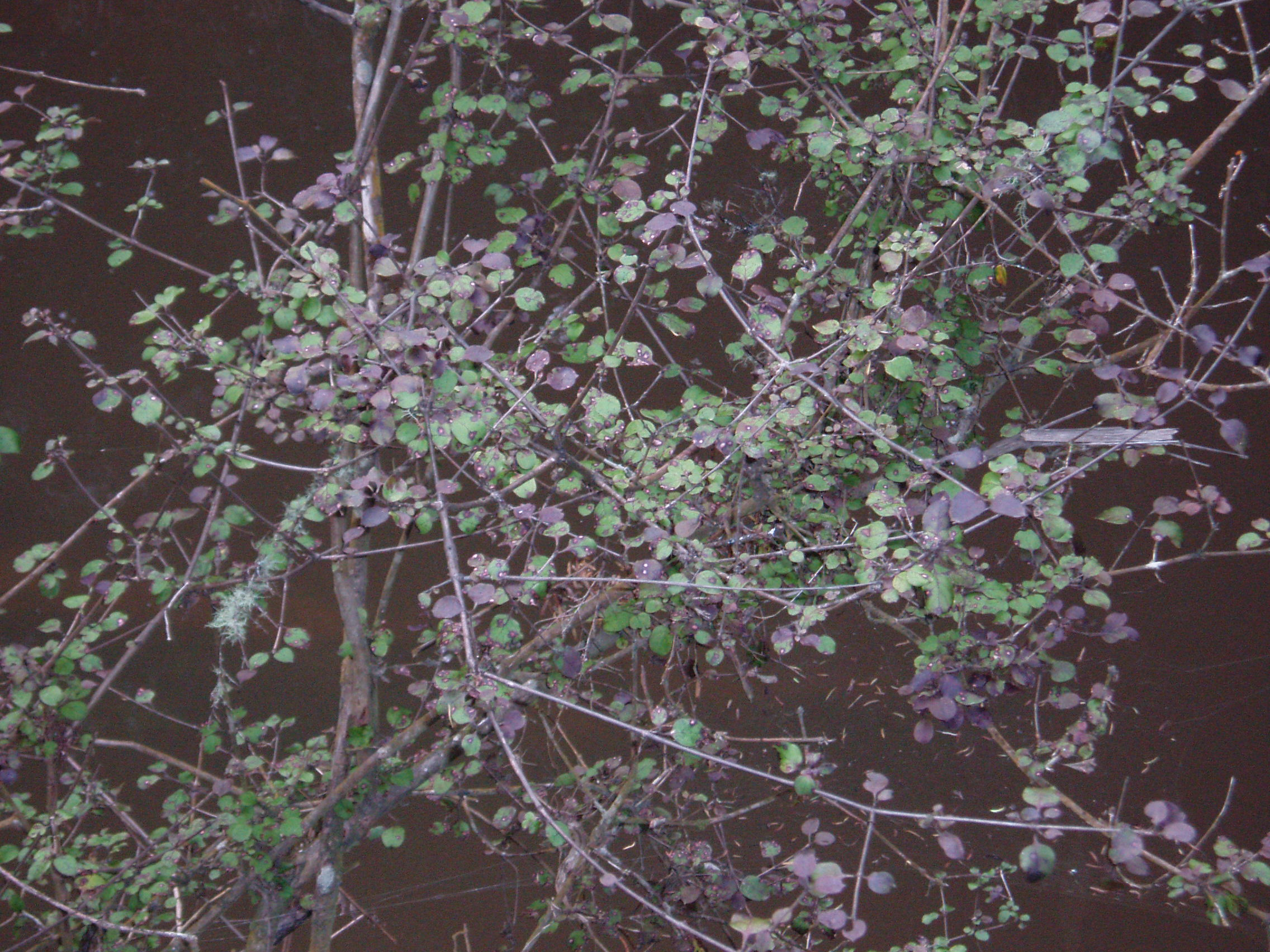
C. rotundifolia, a larval host species

This species is found in native shrubland and forest as well as in tussock, commonly where its host plants are abundant. The larvae of A. callichlora feed on Coprosma species including Coprosma rotundifolia and Coprosma robusta.
