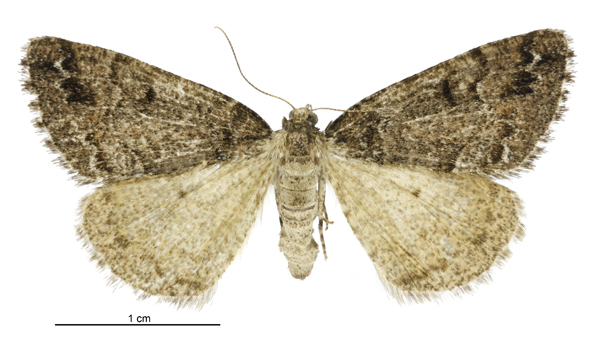
- Female
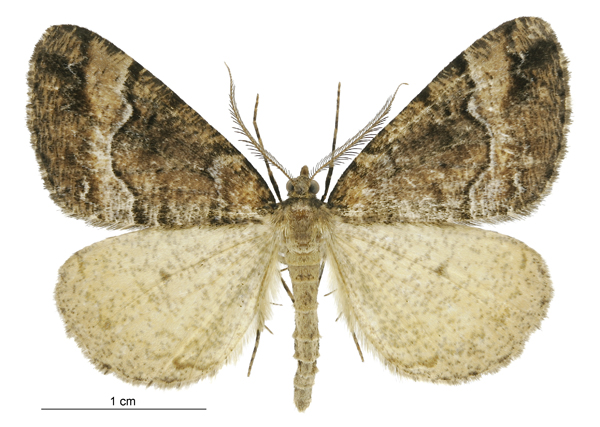
- Male

Scientific classification
- Kingdom: Animalia
- Phylum: Arthropoda
- Clade: Pancrustacea
- Class: Insecta
- Order: Lepidoptera
- Family: Geometridae
- Genus: Pseudocoremia
- Species: P. colpogramma

Binomial name
- Pseudocoremia colpogramma (Meyrick, 1936)

Synonyms
- Selidosema colpogramma Meyrick, 1936

= Pseudocoremia colpogramma =

Species of moth endemic to New Zealand

Pseudocoremia colpogramma is a species of moth in the family Geometridae. This species was described by Edward Meyrick in 1936. It is endemic to New Zealand.

== Taxonomy ==
This species was first described by Edward Meyrick in 1936 using a specimen bred by George Hudson from a larva collected at Arthur's Pass. Meyrick originally named the species Selidosema colpogramma. Hudson discussed and illustrated both the adult male and female in his 1939 book A supplement to the butterflies and moths of New Zealand. In 1988 J. S. Dugdale placed this species in the genus Pseudocoremia. The female lectotype is held at the Natural History Museum, London.

== Description ==
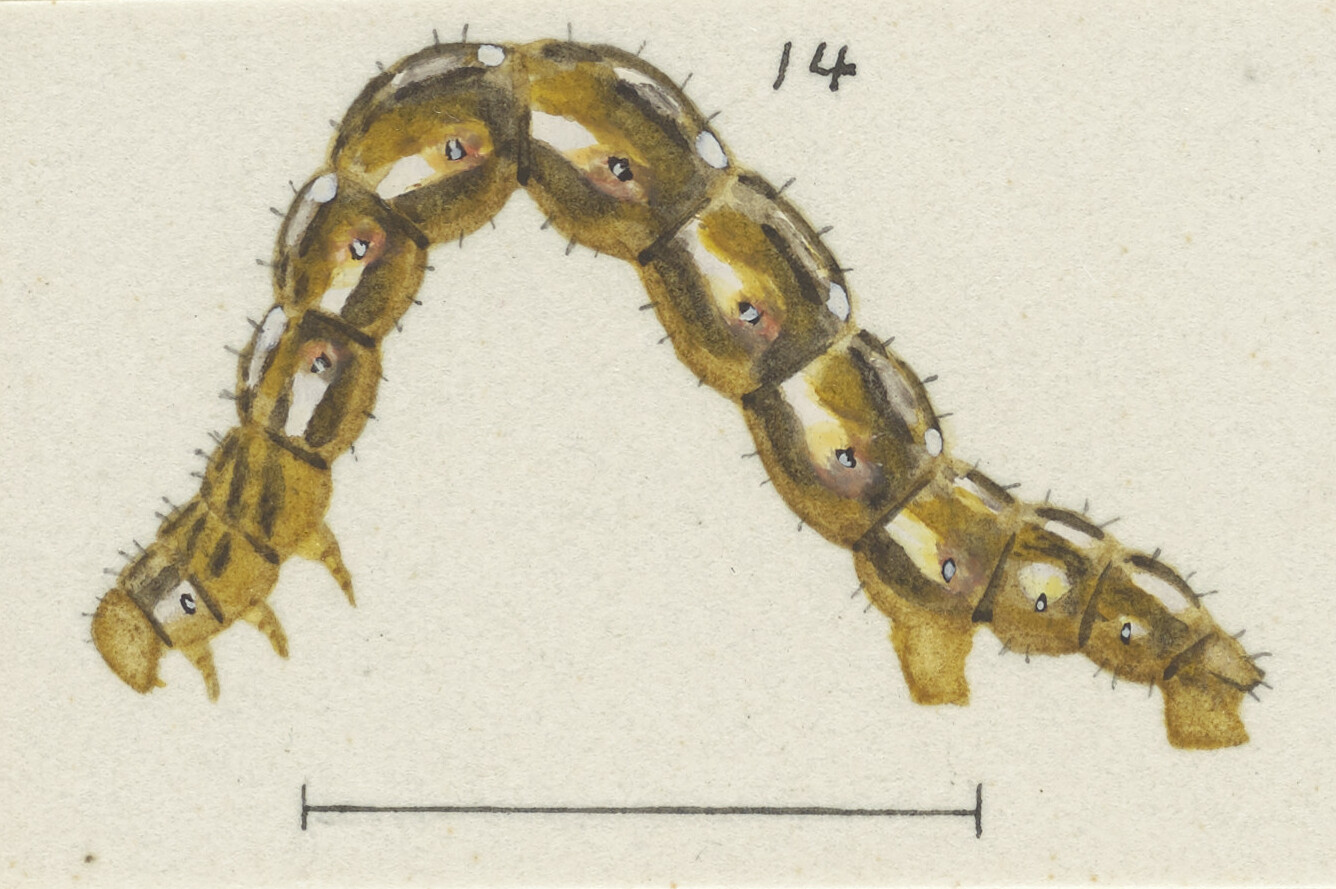
Illustration of larva.

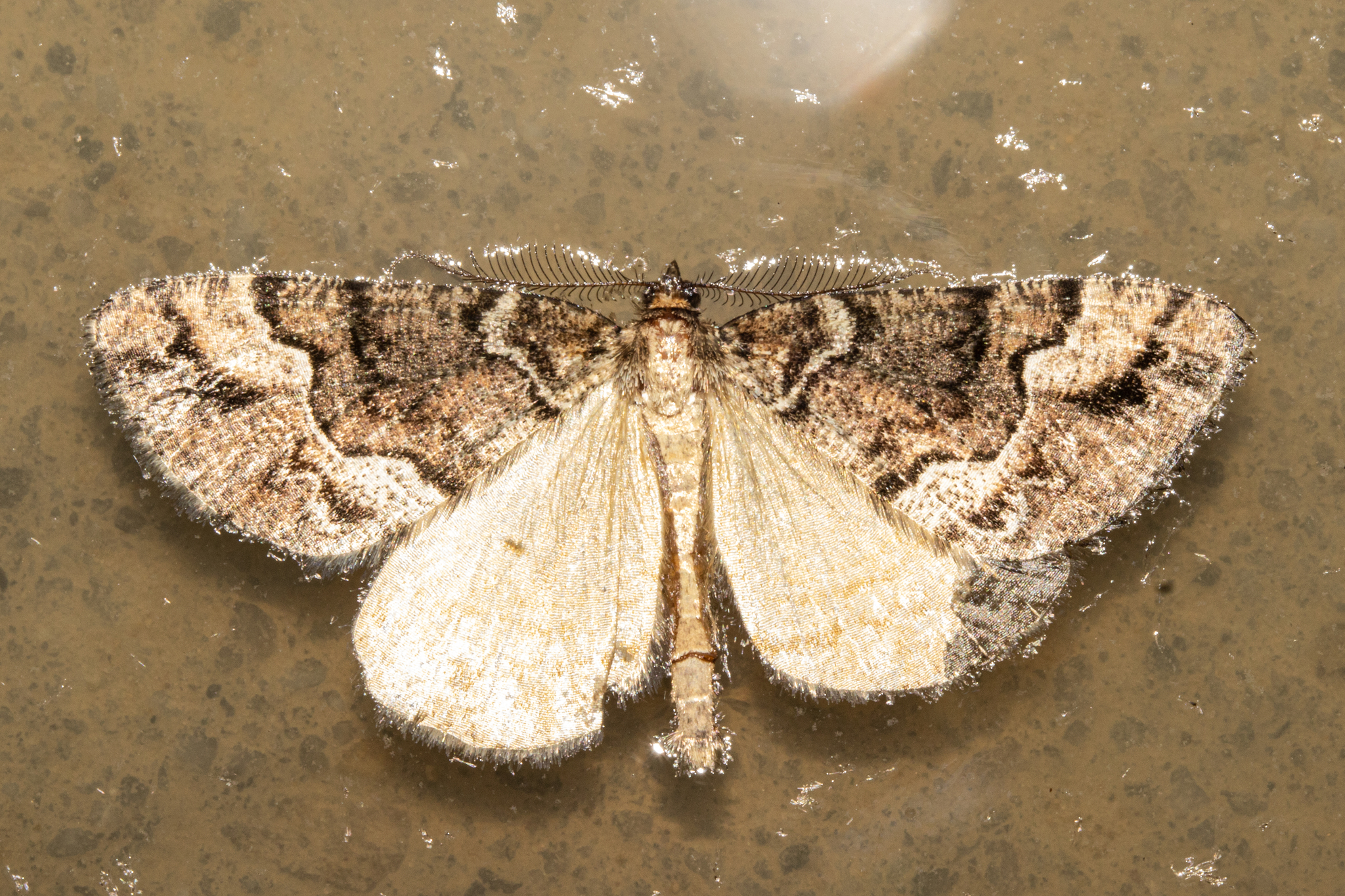

Hudson described this species as follows:

The length of the full-grown larva is about 1 inch. Cylindrical, moderately stout, with segments well defined. Extremely variable in colour, but generally speaking yellowish-brown, variegated with blackish-brown; an irregular series of yellowish-white blotches on sides, and a narrower series on back, more or less margined with the darker colour. These blotches are much less distinct on the anterior and posterior portions of the larva. The whole effect is extraordinarily protective when the larva is resting on its food plant, mountain tauhinu (Cassinia vauvilliersii). Darker larvae resemble mature, or withering shoots, paler ones the younger shoots.

Meyrick described this species as follows:

♂. 31–33 mm. Head, palpi, thorax fuscous, more or less mixed whitish-ochreous. Antennal pectinations ♂ about 8. Fore-wings subtriangular, termen rather obliquely rounded; brownish-ochreous, transversely strigulated dark fuscous; lines waved, whitish, internally strongly edged dark fuscous, first from costa at 1/5 to dorsum at 1/3, excurved, second from costa at 3/5 to dorsum at 2/3, rather excurved in disc but indented or excised above middle, followed in ♂ by broad whitish-ochreous suffusion on costal and dorsal thirds, subterminal nearly parallel to termen, obsolete in middle, in ♀ with an enlargement above this, connected with termen beneath apex by a white dash; discal spot transverse, dark fuscous, inconspicuous; a terminal series of small blackish spots or marks: cilia yellow-whitish irregularly suffused grey. Hindwings ♂ pale greyish-ochreous, ♀ whitish-grey speckled grey; a dark grey discal dot; in ♀ a slightly excurved transverse series of cloudy grey spots at 4/5, and terminal series of small blackish marks; cilia ♂ pale greyish-ochreous, ♀ ochreous-whitish.

The female of this species is paler than the male. Hudson pointed out that this species resembles P. productata but differs from it as P. colpogramma's antennal pectinations are slightly shorter and has distinctive dark grey subterminal spots on the hind-wings.

== Distribution ==
P. colpogramma is endemic to New Zealand. Other than the type locality, this species has been observed in the Tasman, North Canterbury and Otago regions.

== Habitat and hosts ==
This species inhabits subalpine forest and scrub. The larvae of this species feed on species in the genus Ozothamnus including Ozothamnus leptophyllus. Larvae also feed on native broom Carmichaelia.

== Behaviour ==
Larvae usually rest quietly amongst the foliage, where it is almost invisible. Larvae emerge late in February and early in March. Adults are on the wing from January until March.
