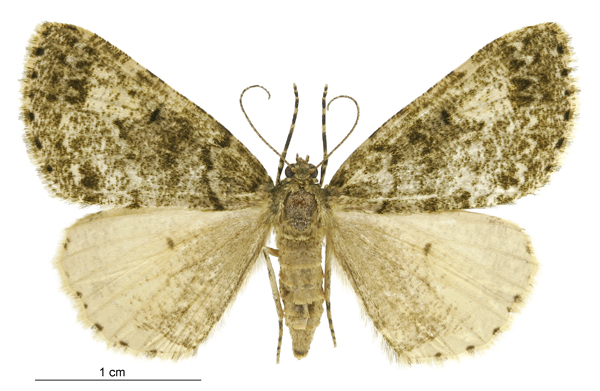
- Female
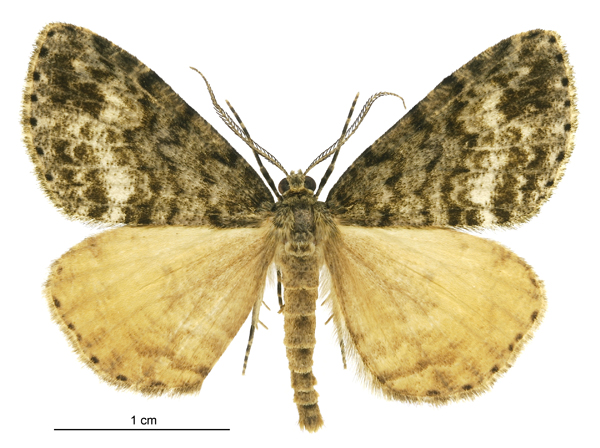
- Male

Scientific classification
- Kingdom: Animalia
- Phylum: Arthropoda
- Clade: Pancrustacea
- Class: Insecta
- Order: Lepidoptera
- Family: Geometridae
- Genus: Pseudocoremia
- Species: P. indistincta

Binomial name
- Pseudocoremia indistincta Butler, 1877

Synonyms
- Selidosema indistincta (Butler, 1877)

= Pseudocoremia indistincta =

Species of moth endemic to New Zealand

Pseudocoremia indistincta, also known as the Grey-green moth, is a species of moth in the family Geometridae. It was first described by Arthur Gardiner Butler in 1877. This species is endemic to New Zealand and can be found throughout the country including in the North, South and Stewart Islands. This species inhabits native forest, shrubland and other wooded areas. It has been hypothesised that this species has two broods a year. Larvae feed on species in the genera Astelia and Muehlenbeckia. When feeding on Astelia species the larvae is able, as a result of its flattened shape, to hide in the bases of the host plant leaves. The pupation habits of the larvae have yet to be resolved. Adults are nocturnal and are attracted to light. They are on the wing from November until April. Adults commonly rest on tree trunks where their colouration ensures they are well camouflaged.

== Taxonomy ==
This species was first described by Arthur Gardiner Butler in 1877 using a specimen collected by James Hector in Dunedin. George Hudson discussed and illustrated this species under the name Selidosema indistincta in his 1928 book The butterflies and moths of New Zealand. In 1988 John S. Dugdale discussed this species under the name Pseudocoremia indistincta. This placement was also followed in the 2010 New Zealand Inventory of Biodiversity. The male holotype is held in the Natural History Museum, London.

== Description ==
Living specimen

Hudson described the adults of this species as follows:

The expansion of the wings is about 1 1/4 inches. The fore-wings of the male are dull greenish-grey, with black and white markings; there is a blackish transverse line near the base; another near the middle, followed by a very broken irregular line then a broader, pale area usually composed of a number of confluent white blotches, followed by a series of cloudy black marks, and a very wavy pale subterminal line. The hind-wings are ochreous mottled with pale brown near the dorsum; there is a series of black dots on the termen of both fore- and hind-wings. The fore-wings of the female are dull brown, faintly tinged with green; all the markings are very indistinct, and there are no clear white patches as in the male.

It is variable in appearance but can be distinguished from most similar species by its greenish tinge, and the absence of indentations on the termen of both fore- and hind-wings. David E. Gaskin stated that the male of the species is more greenish grey in colour with a few white blotches on the forewings while the female is a greenish brown.

This species is similar in appearance to P. rudisata and P. fenerata but can be distinguished as specimens of P. indistincta are darker in comparison and the hindwings are a yellowish or pale orange colour compared to the pale or less intensely coloured hindwings of the previously mentioned species.

Hudson described the larva of this species as follows:

... about 1 inch in length, considerably flattened and rapidly tapering at the posterior extremity; brownish-green on the back and pale green underneath; there is a very conspicuous slightly waved brown lateral line and two faint interrupted brownish-green dorsal lines; the head is yellowish-brown dappled with darker brown, and the spiracles are white with fine black rings; the prolegs are very small.

== Distribution ==
P. indistincta is endemic to New Zealand. This moth is found throughout New Zealand including in the North, South and Stewart Islands. Hudson regarded this species as being very common.

== Habitat and hosts ==
Larval host Astelia solandri.

This species inhabits native forest, scrubland and wooded areas. It is also common in New Zealand beech forests and has been observed both in mountainous regions, where adults have be collected at altitudes of up to 4,000 feet (1,200 m), as well as in lowland habitat. The larvae of this moth feed on species in the genera Astelia, including Astelia solandri, and Muehlenbeckia, including Muehlenbeckia australis.

== Life cycle ==
Gaskin hypothesised that this species likely had two broods a year, with the summer brood maturing quickly and the autumn brood over wintering either as larvae or in the pupal stage. He supported this hypothesis with the argument that adult moths have been observed in early and mid-summer and again in autumn. Gaskin stated that once mature the larvae either spin a cocoon near their host plant or alternatively migrate down to the ground to pupate. However he pointed out that there was doubt regarding which behaviour is an accurate description of the pupation habits of this species.

== Behaviour ==
The larva is very sluggish in its habits, seldom walking. When feeding on Astelia it lives between the large leaves, its flattened shape enabling it to safely retreat to the bases of the leaves where it is secure from all enemies.

Adults are nocturnal and are attracted to light. They are commonly observed on the wing from November until April. Adults are well camouflaged when resting on tree trunks as the colouring of the fore-wings harmonises perfectly, and the pale-coloured hind-wings tends to be concealed by the upper pair.

== Gallery ==
Illustration in original description.

Illustration of female

Illustration of male

Illustration of larva

Camouflaged on a tree trunk
