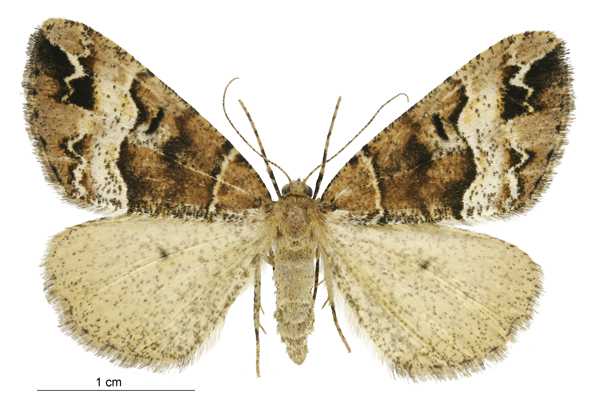
- Female
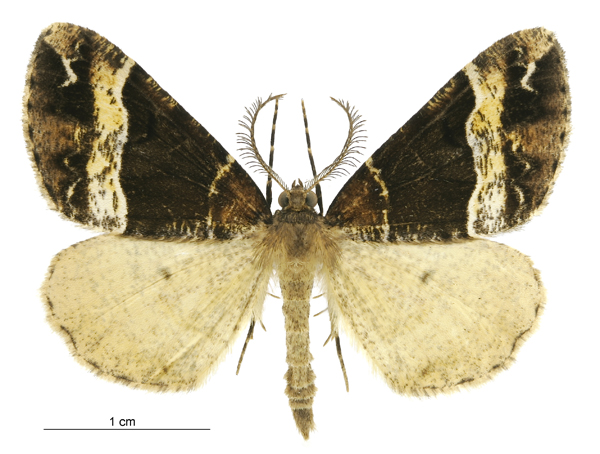
- Male

Scientific classification
- Kingdom: Animalia
- Phylum: Arthropoda
- Clade: Pancrustacea
- Class: Insecta
- Order: Lepidoptera
- Family: Geometridae
- Genus: Pseudocoremia
- Species: P. fascialata

Binomial name
- Pseudocoremia fascialata (Philpott, 1903)

Synonyms
- Selidosema fascialata Philpott, 1903

= Pseudocoremia fascialata =

Species of moth endemic to New Zealand

Pseudocoremia fascialata, also known as the Horopito flash, is a species of moth in the family Geometridae. It was first described by Alfred Philpott in 1903. This species is endemic to New Zealand and has been collected in the North, South and Stewart Islands. This species inhabits native forest. Adults are on the wing from December until April and are attracted to light. Larvae feed on a variety of native trees and shrubs including Pseudowinteria axillaris and Pseudowinteria colorata.

== Taxonomy ==
This species was first described by Alfred Philpott in 1903 and originally named Selidosema fascialata. George Hudson discussed and illustrated this species in his 1928 book The butterflies and moths of New Zealand under that name. In 1988 John S. Dugdale assigned the species to the genus Pseudocoremia. The male lectotype, collected by Philpott collected at South Plains in Southland, is held at the New Zealand Arthropod Collection.

== Description ==
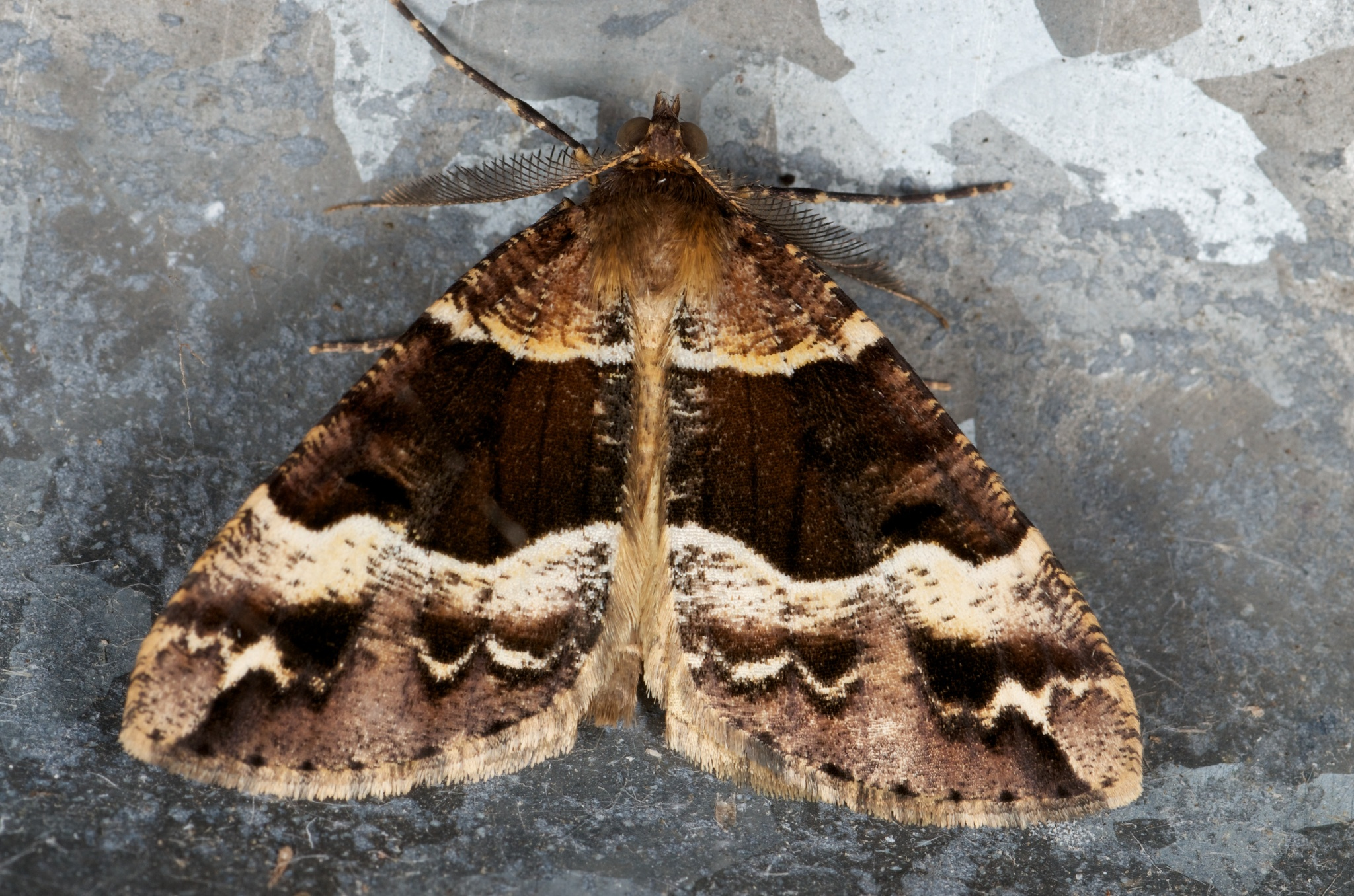
Living specimen.

Philpott described this species as follows:

♂, ♀. 35-38 mm. Head and thorax dull-brownish. Abdomen pale - yellow. Fore wings rich dark - brown irrorated with darker ; a yellowish- white convex band at 1/4, anteriorly somewhat suffused ; space from 1/4 to 2/3 occupied by a broad blackish - brown band, posteriorly deeply indented above middle, and broadly margined with an irregular yellowish-white suffusion ; a subterminal serrate white line, interrupted in middle, broadly and irregularly margined with blackish-brown ; a subapical triangular patch margined below with blackish-brown ; a row of minute black spots on termen. Hind wings yellow, with a few scattered dark scales, and sometimes a row of black dots on termen.

Philpott noted that the female is paler in colouration. He stated that this species differs from P. productata as P. fascialata has more pronounced markings and a deep indentation in the posterior margin of the median band.

== Distribution ==
It is endemic to New Zealand. It has been observed in the North, South and Stewart Islands.

== Habitat and hosts ==
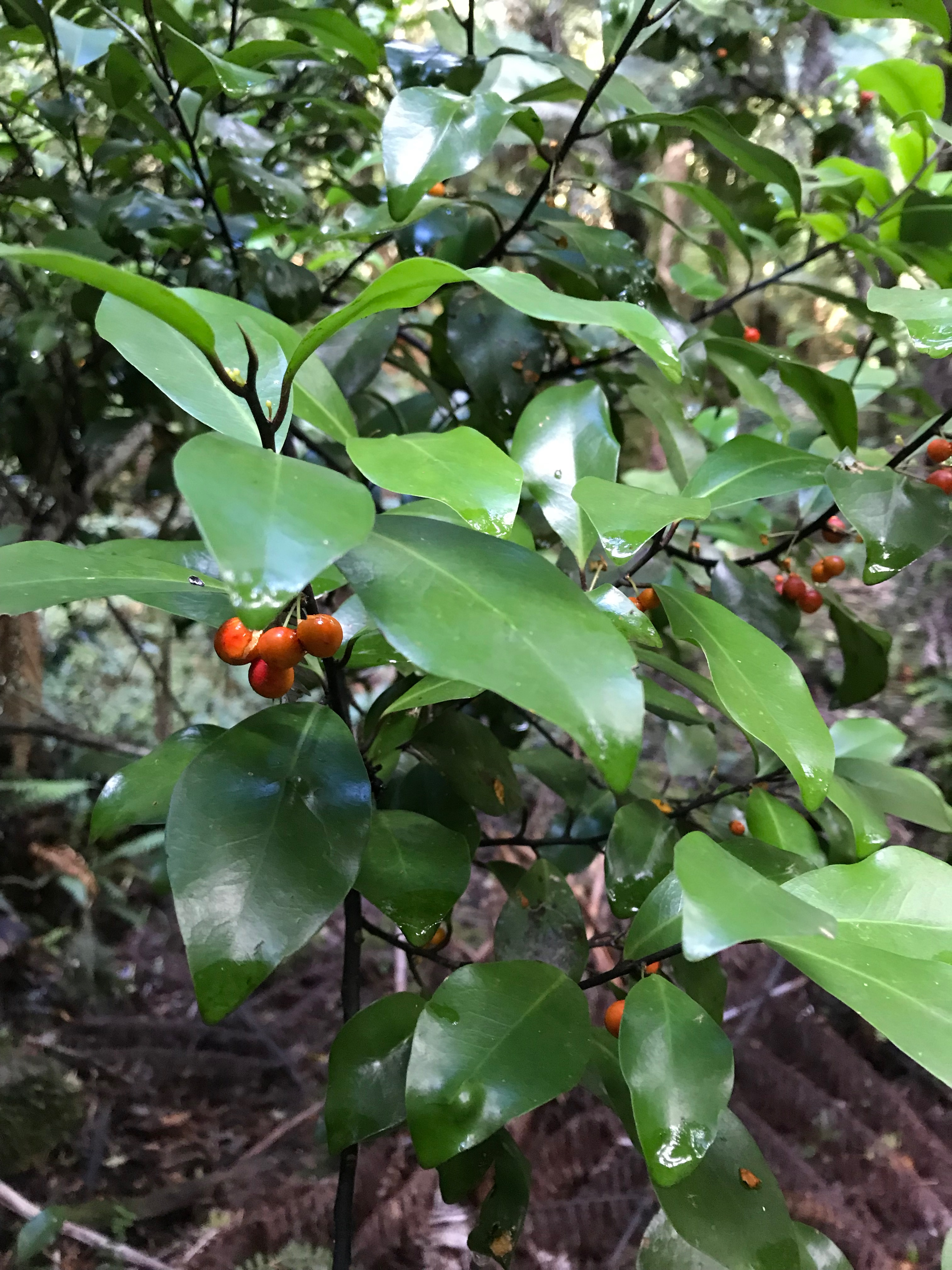
Larval host P. axillaris.

P. fascialata frequents native forest. Larvae feed on a variety of native trees and shrubs including Pseudowinteria axillaris and Pseudowinteria colorata.

== Behaviour ==
Adults of this species are on the wing from December to April. They are attracted to light and have been collected via a mercury vapour light trap. Adults have shown an affinity for the species Jacobaea vulgaris.
