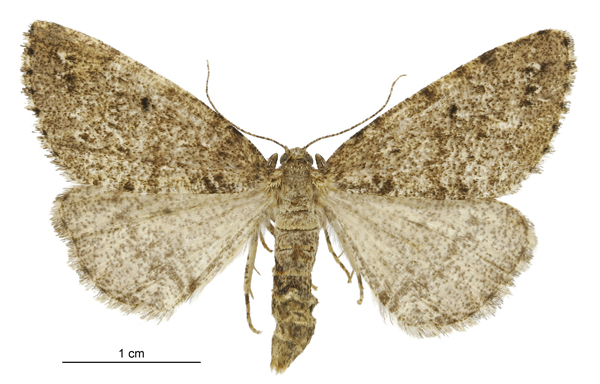
- Female
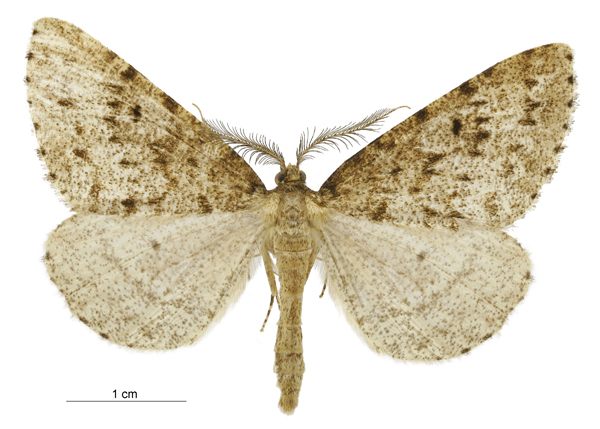
- Male

Scientific classification
- Kingdom: Animalia
- Phylum: Arthropoda
- Clade: Pancrustacea
- Class: Insecta
- Order: Lepidoptera
- Family: Geometridae
- Genus: Pseudocoremia
- Species: P. terrena

Binomial name
- Pseudocoremia terrena (Philpott, 1915)

Synonyms
- Selidosema terrena Philpott, 1915

= Pseudocoremia terrena =

Species of moth endemic to New Zealand

Pseudocoremia terrena is a species of moth in the family Geometridae. This species was first described by Alfred Philpott in 1915. It is endemic to New Zealand and is found in the southern parts of the South Island. This species inhabits the upper edge of subalpine native forests. Larvae feed on species in the genus Veronica. Adults are on the wing from November until March.

== Taxonomy ==
This species was first described by Alfred Philpott in 1915 and originally named Selidosema terrena. George Hudson, discussed and illustrated this species in his 1928 book The butterflies and moths of New Zealand under that name. In 1988 John S. Dugdale assigned the species to the genus Pseudocoremia. The male holotype specimen, collected by Harold Hamilton at Bold Peak of the Humboldt Mountains, is held at Te Papa.

== Description ==
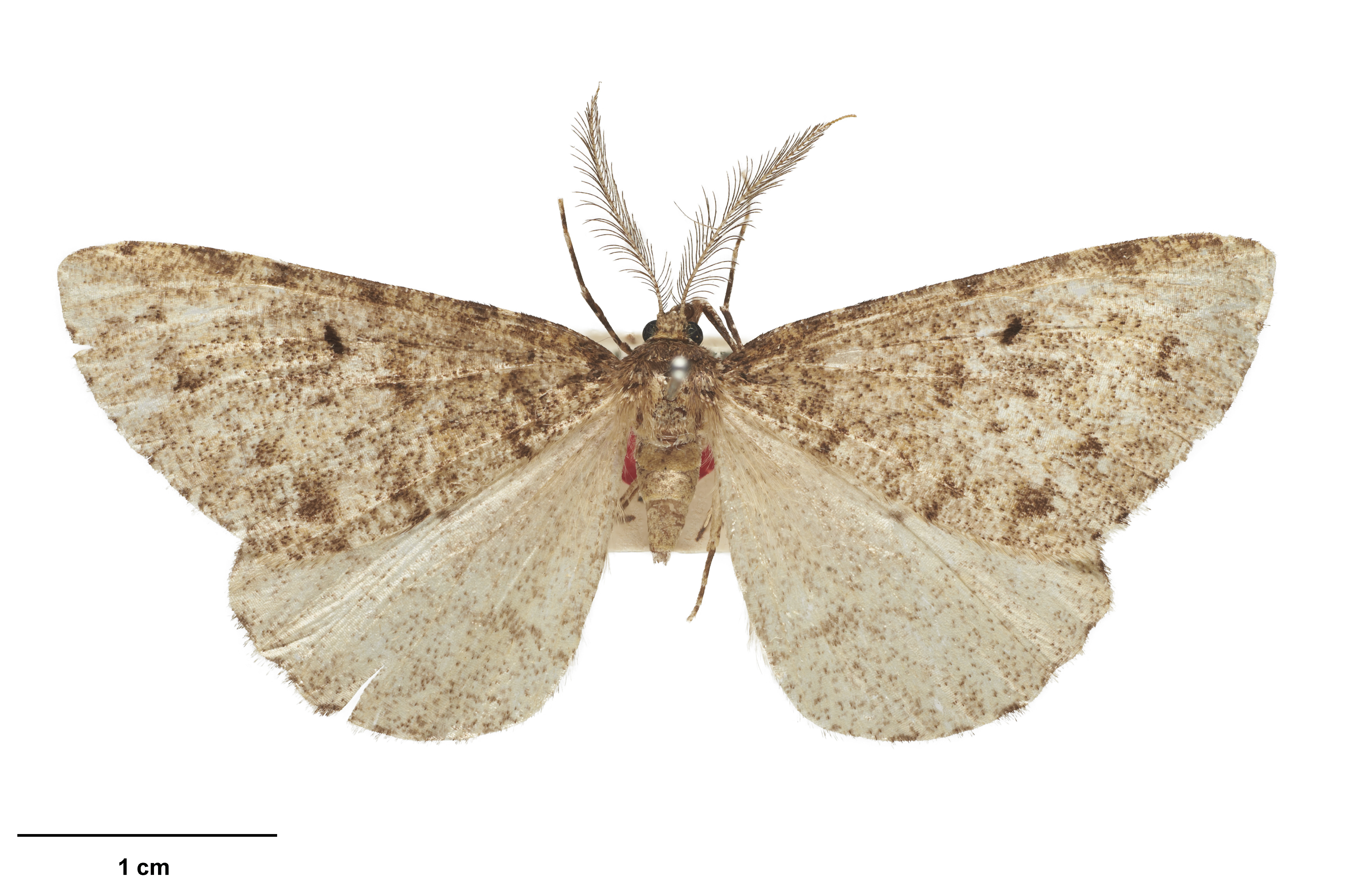
Male holotype specimen.

Philpott described this species as follows:

♂. 49 mm. Head grey mixed with brown. Antennae dull brown, ciliations long. Thorax brown mixed with grey. Abdomen grey. Legs grey, sprinkled and annulated with fuscous-brown. Forewings triangular, costa straight, termen evenly rounded, oblique ; whitish-grey, densely irrorated with, brownish-fuscous which forms indistinct basal, first, second, and subterminal fasciae; a rather large inwardly oblique discal dot: cilia (incomplete) grey mixed with brown. Hindwings greyish-white, minutely sprinkled with brownish-fuscous : cilia grey.

The female does not have brachypterous or narrower and sharper wings that can be found in sister species such as those in the P. modica complex.

Philpott explained that this species is similar in appearance to Pseudocoremia productata in the form of its wing and its antennae structure but can be distinguishing from that species as the hindwings of P. terrena are grey.

== Distribution ==
This species is endemic to New Zealand. It has been observed in the southern parts of the South Island.

== Habitat and hosts ==
P. terrena inhabits the upper edge of subalpine native forests. The larval host of this moth are species in the genus Veronica.

== Behaviour ==
Adults of this species are on the wing from November until March.
