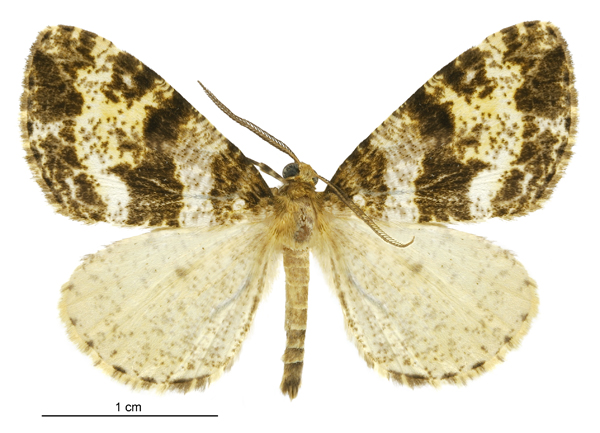
- Male
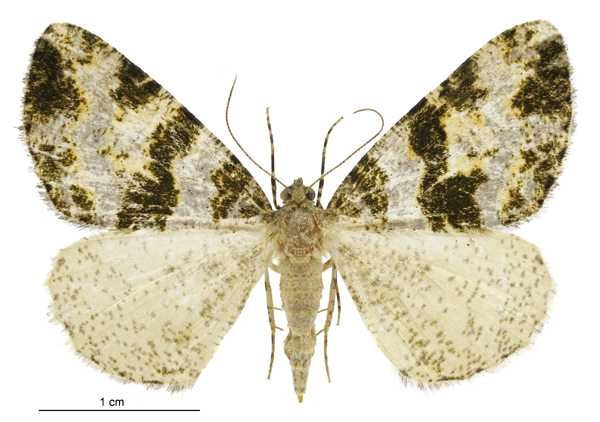
- Female

Conservation status
- Declining (NZ TCS)

Scientific classification
- Kingdom: Animalia
- Phylum: Arthropoda
- Clade: Pancrustacea
- Class: Insecta
- Order: Lepidoptera
- Family: Geometridae
- Genus: Pseudocoremia
- Species: P. albafasciata

Binomial name
- Pseudocoremia albafasciata (Philpott, 1915)

Synonyms
- Selidosema albafasciata Philpott, 1915; Selidosema albifasciata Meyrick, 1917

= Pseudocoremia albafasciata =

Species of moth endemic to New Zealand

Pseudocoremia albafasciata, also known as the flash moth, is a species of moth in the family Geometridae. It is endemic to New Zealand and is found in the North Island. Adults have been observed on the wing from November until March. It has the "at risk, declining" threat classification as given by the Department of Conservation.

== Taxonomy ==
This species was first described by Alfred Philpott in 1915 from specimens collected in Taihape in February and Feilding in March. Philpott named the species Selidosema albafasciata. In 1917 Edward Meyrick, when listing the species, attempted to correct the spelling of the epithet to albifasciata. This spelling was itself in error. George Hudson, following Meyrick, discussed and illustrated this species in his 1928 book The butterflies and moths of New Zealand under the name Selidosema albifasciata. In 1988 John S. Dugdale assigned the species to the genus Pseudocoremia. He retained the original spelling of the species epithet under the ICZN Rules, Article 32a (ii) and 32c. The male holotype was collected by Augustus Hamilton in Taihape and is now held at the Museum of New Zealand Te Papa Tongarewa.

== Description ==
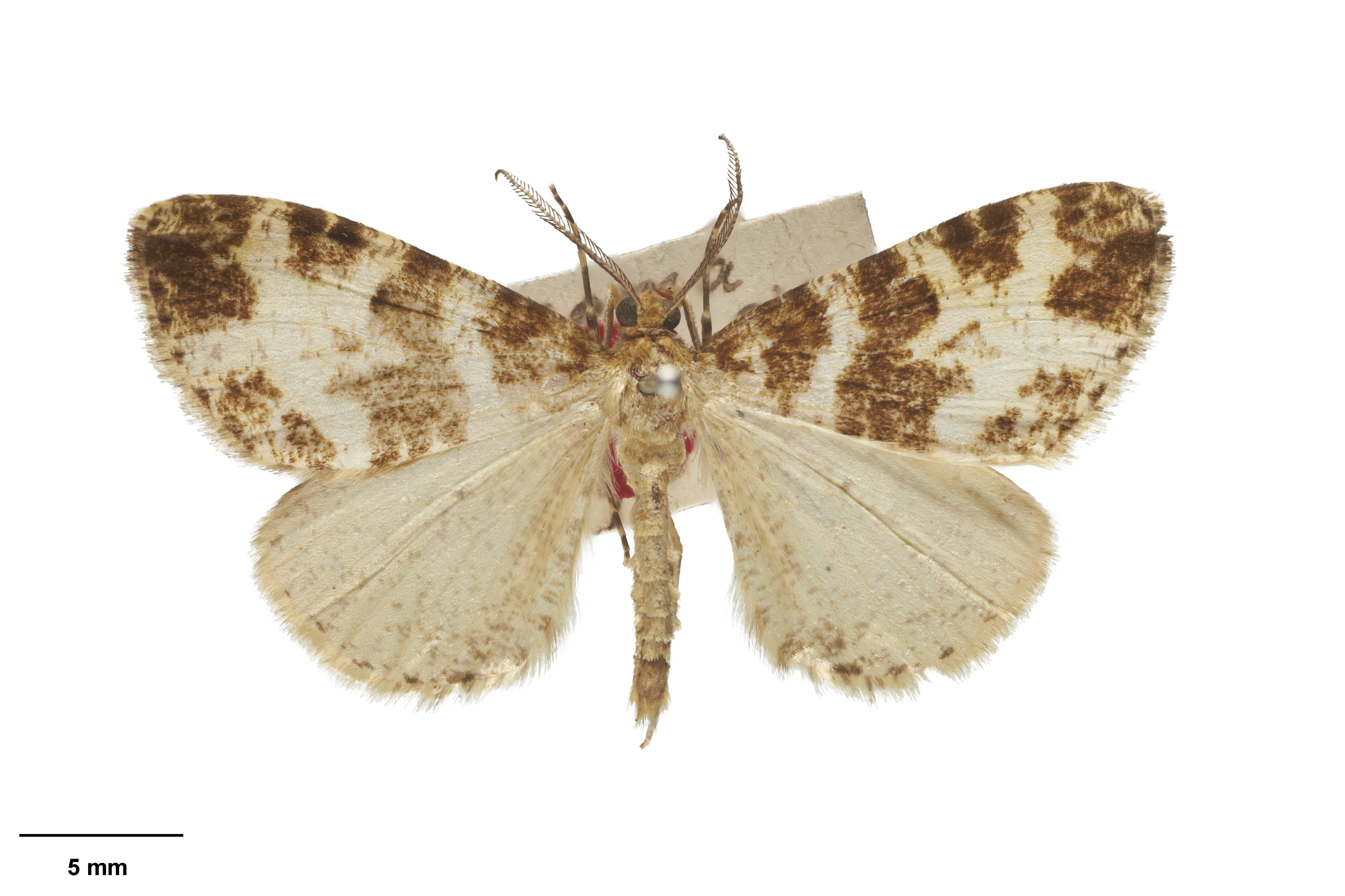
Male holotype of P. albafasciata.

Philpott described the species as follows:

32-34 mm. Head and thorax ochreous mixed with brown. Antennae brown, annulated with ochreous, filiations rather short. Abdomen ochreous. Forewings moderate, triangular, costa subsinuate, termen evenly rounded, not strongly oblique; dark greenish-fuscous with some admixture of yellowish; markings white tinted with yellow and sparsely sprinkled with brown; a broad band at J slightly curved; median and second fasciae broad, coalescing at middle and enclosing a triangular blotch of ground-colour on costa; sometimes throwing out a projection to middle of termen, thus interrupting the broad dark terminal area; a terminal series of irregular blackish dots : cilia ochreous mixed with brown. Hind wings pale yellow sprinkled with fuscous; a more or less interrupted brown terminal line: cilia yellow obscurely barred with brown.

Philpott pointed out that the female differs by having much of the dark ground colour replaced by the lighter shade of the markings. The basal patch and median band are much reduced, and the terminal dark area is represented only by a triangular subapical patch and some small marks on the lower half.

Although similar in appearance to Pseudocoremia melinata this species differs in appearance as it has a broad white first line on its forewings.

== Distribution ==
This species is endemic to New Zealand. It has been observed in the North Island. Hudson stated this species had also been observed in Central Otago.

== Biology and host species ==
The biology and host species of this moth is unknown.

== Behaviour ==
Adults have been observed on the wing from November until March.

== Conservation status ==
In 2025 P. albafasciata was classified under the New Zealand Threat Classification system as being at risk, declining. This classification was as a result of the species being biologically sparse, adversely affected by long term climate change, and range restricted. However there is a lack of data about the population size and trend. This species is in need of further research in order to assist with the conservation of this species.

The 2025 conservation classification has improved in comparison to the classification given in 2015 where this species was regarded as being Nationally Endangered.
