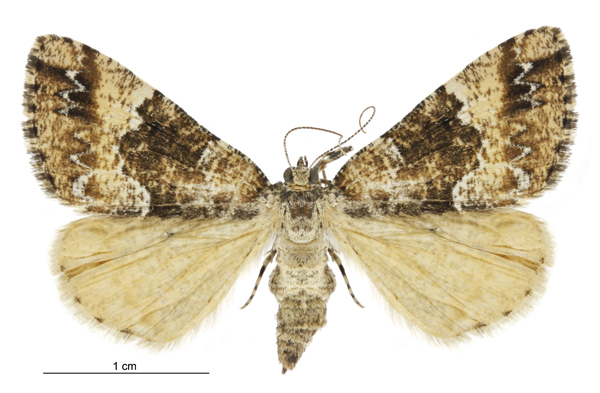
- Female
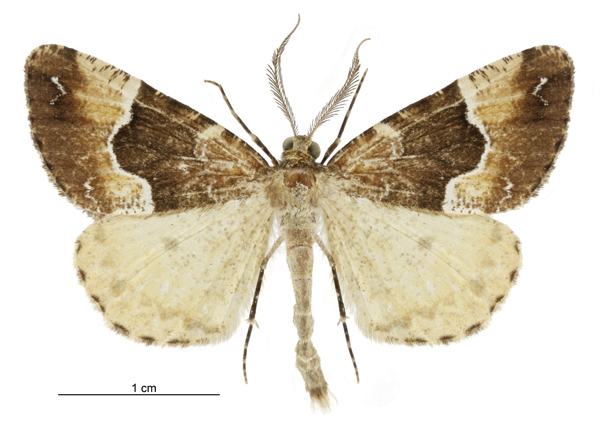
- Male

Scientific classification
- Kingdom: Animalia
- Phylum: Arthropoda
- Clade: Pancrustacea
- Class: Insecta
- Order: Lepidoptera
- Family: Geometridae
- Genus: Pseudocoremia
- Species: P. insignita

Binomial name
- Pseudocoremia insignita (Philpott, 1930)

Synonyms
- Selidosema insignita Philpott, 1930

= Pseudocoremia insignita =

Species of moth endemic to New Zealand

Pseudocoremia insignita, also known as the tree nettle flash, is a species of moth in the family Geometridae. It is endemic to New Zealand.

== Taxonomy ==
This species was first described by Alfred Philpott in 1930 under the name Selidosema insignita. In 1939 George Hudson discussed and illustrated this species in his 1939 book A supplement to the butterflies and moths of New Zealand. In 1988 John S. Dugdale placed this species in the genus Pseudocoremia. At the same time he synonymised P. pergrata into this species. However in 2003 P. pergrata was reinstated as species separate from P. insignita. The holotype was collected from Kaeo in the Far North District on 16 January 1921 by C. B. Clarke, and is held by the Auckland War Memorial Museum.

== Description ==
Philpott described the species as follows:

♂. 32 mm. Head and palpi brown. Thorax greyish brown. Antennae brown, in ♂ moderately bipectinated, pectinations gradually decreasing in length apically, last twelve or thirteen segments simple. Abdomen greyish ochreous, sprinkled with fuscous. Legs ochreous, mixed with fuscous, anterior pair blackish, all tarsi annulated with ochreous. Forewings elongate triangular, costa moderately arched, apex blunt, termen bowed, oblique; whitish ochreous; basal 3/5 fuscous brown; first line indicated by ochreous outwards-curved fascia on costa at 1/4; outer edge of median band (margin of dark area) broadly and strongly projecting at middle, margined with white; a broad brownish terminal area including obscure white waved subterminal line: fringes (damaged) apparently brown mixed with ochreous. Hindwings pale ochreous sparsely sprinkled with brown; an interrupted brown line round termen: fringes ochreous.

Philpott noted that the shape of the outer median band margin differed from all other New Zealand species in the (then) Selidosema genus.

== Distribution ==
This species is endemic to New Zealand and is found from Northland to Otago.

== Habitat and hosts ==
The preferred habitat of this species are native scrub and forest edges. The larval host is Urtica ferox.

== Gallery ==
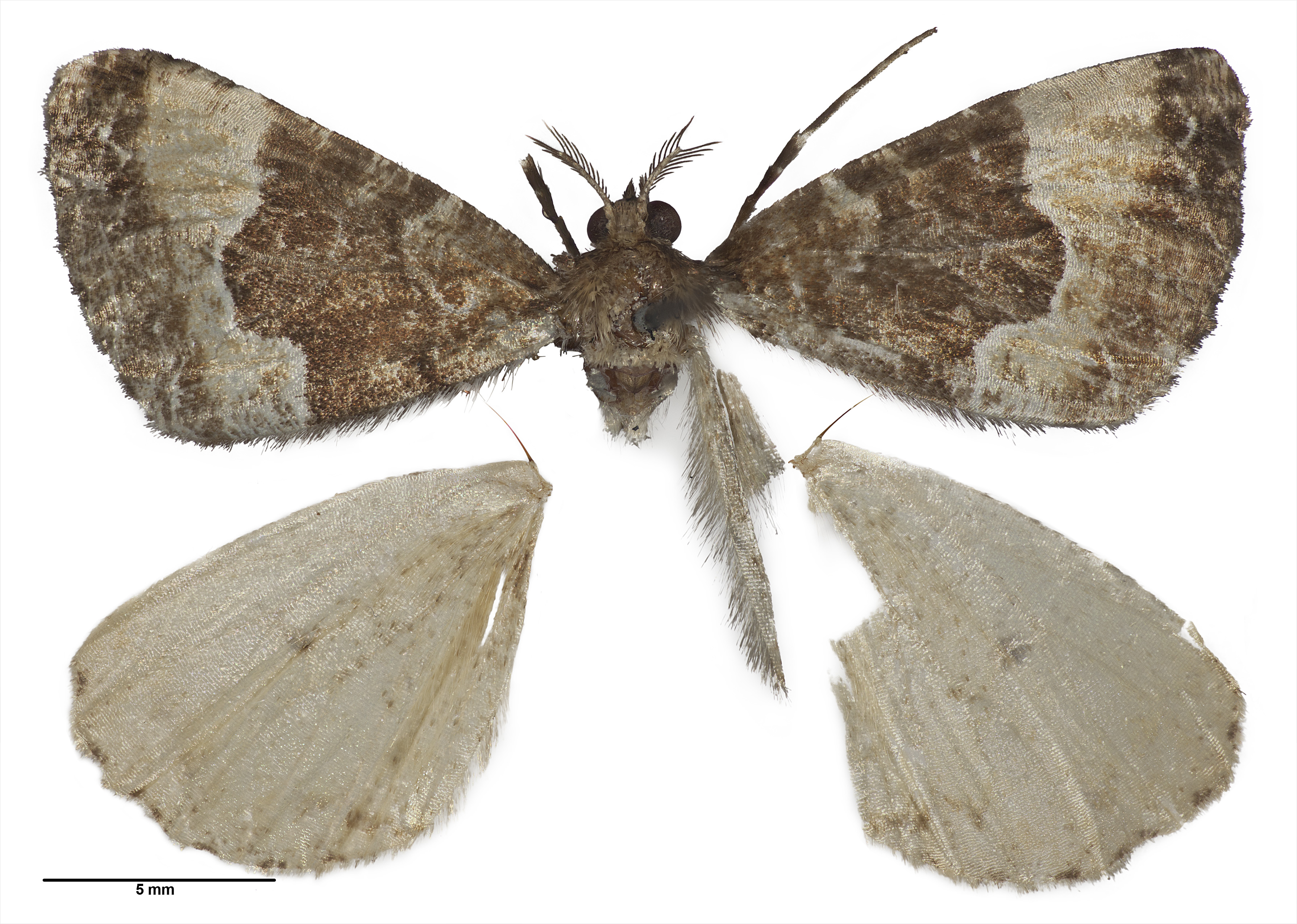
Holotype of Pseudocoremia insignita at the Auckland War Memorial Museum

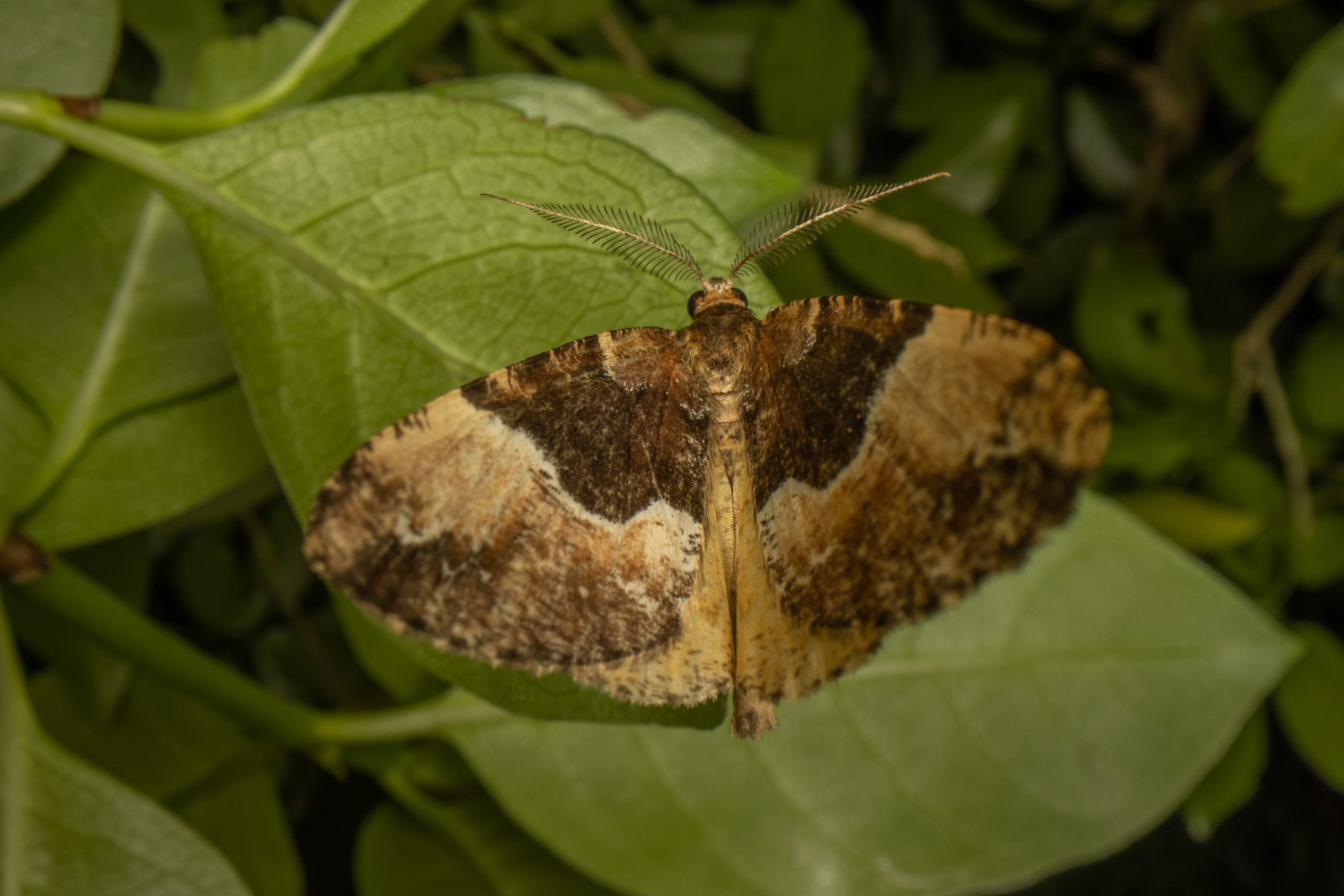
Pseudocoremia insignita in situ

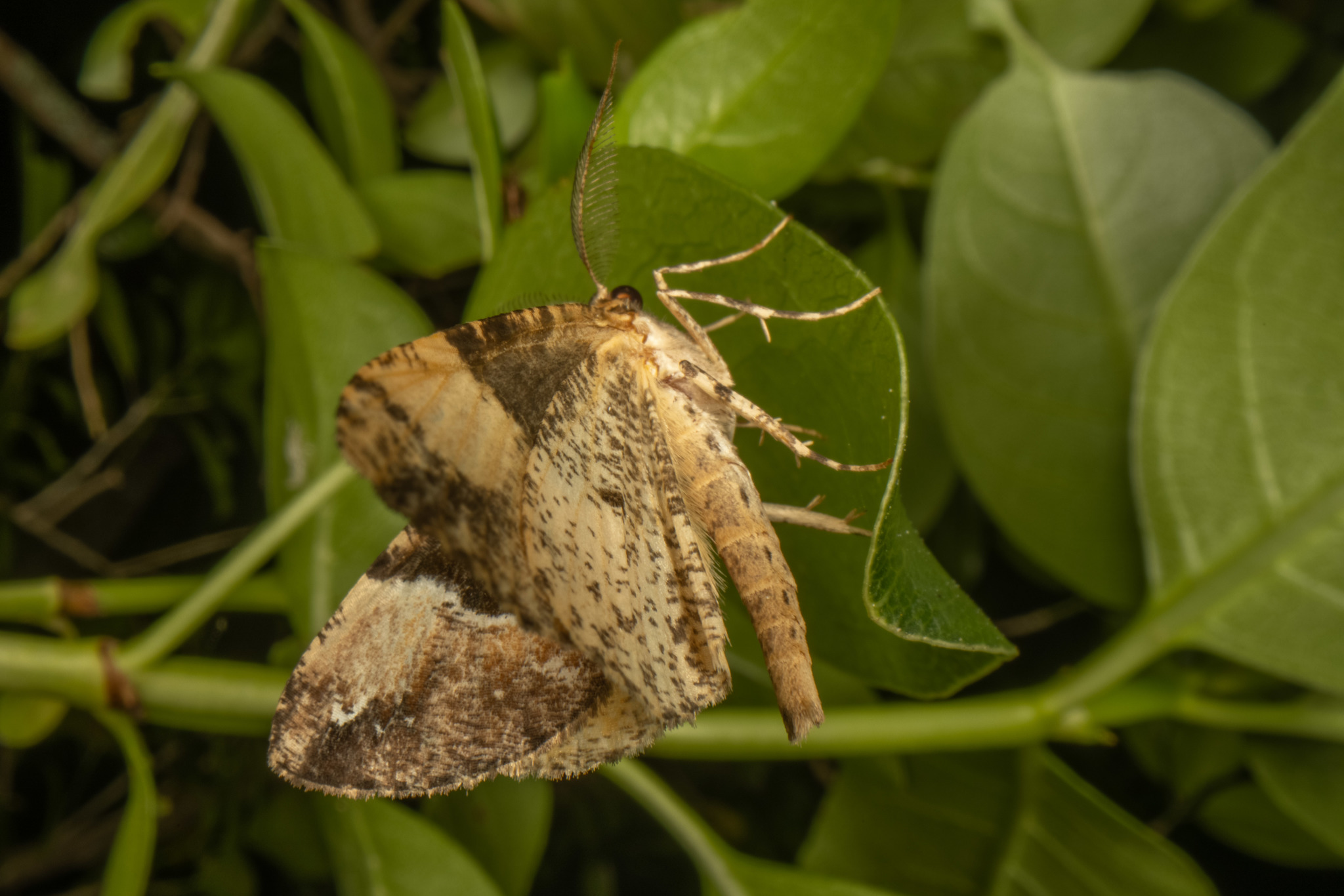
Underside of the wings of a Pseudocoremia insignita

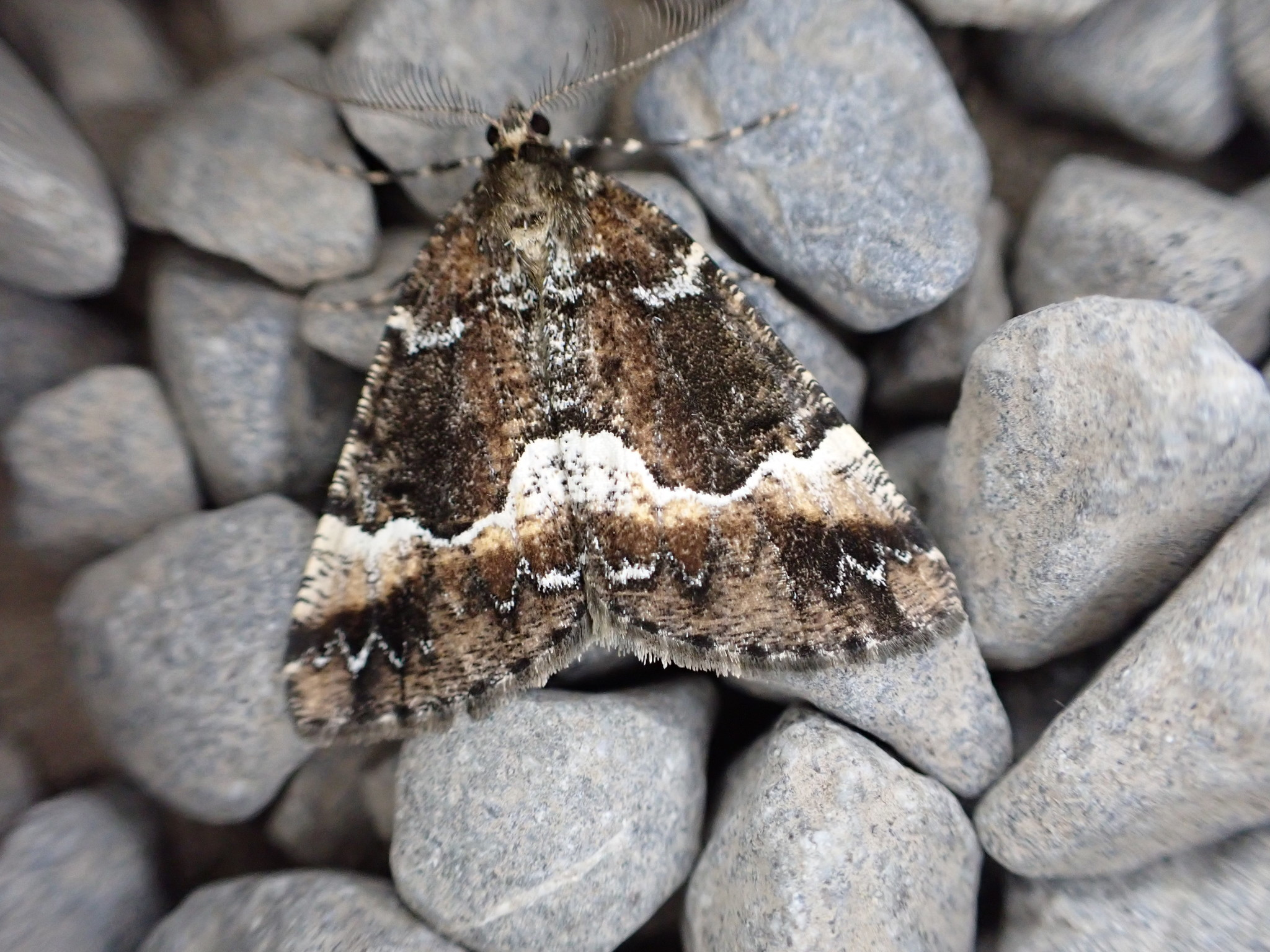
Pseudocoremia insignita in situ
