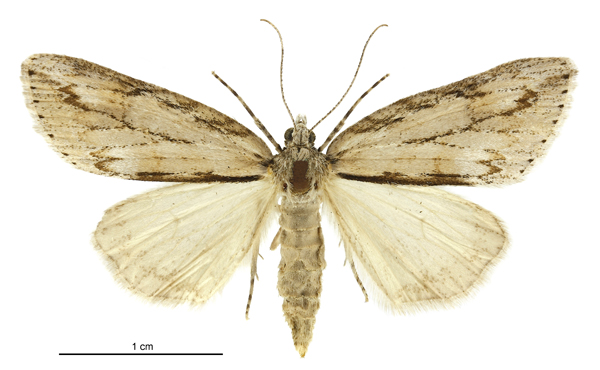
- Female
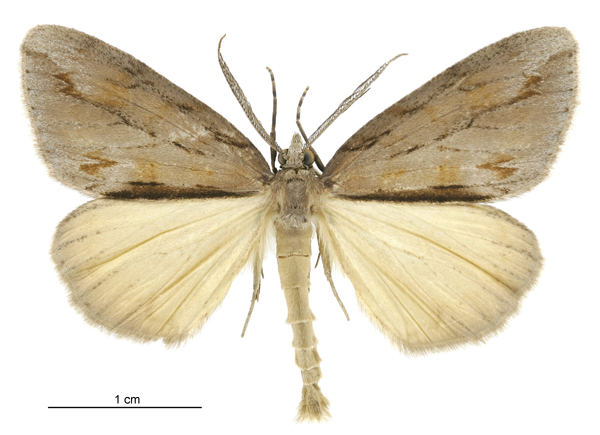
- Male

Scientific classification
- Kingdom: Animalia
- Phylum: Arthropoda
- Class: Insecta
- Order: Lepidoptera
- Family: Geometridae
- Genus: Pseudocoremia
- Species: P. lupinata

Binomial name
- Pseudocoremia lupinata (Felder & Rogenhofer, 1875)

Synonyms
- Cidaria lupinata Felder & Rogenhofer, 1875; Selidosema lupinata (Felder & Rogenhofer, 1875); Selidosema humillima Hudson, 1898

= Pseudocoremia lupinata =

Species of moth endemic to New Zealand

Pseudocoremia lupinata is a species of moth in the family Geometridae. It is endemic to New Zealand and can be found in both the North and South Islands. The favoured habitat of this species is Kānuka scrubland as its larval hosts are species in the genus Kunzea. Both the larvae and adults of this species are nocturnal. Adult moths are commonly on the wing from December to June and are attracted to light.

== Taxonomy ==
This species was first described by Baron Cajetan von Felder, Rudolf Felder and Alois Friedrich Rogenhofer in 1875 using a specimen collected in Nelson by T. R. Oxley and named Cidaria lupinata. Edward Meyrick in 1883 placed this species within the genus Pseudocoremia. He confirmed this placement in 1884. In 1898 George Hudson, thinking he was describing a new species, named this species Selidosema humilima. In 1909 Meyrick placed synonymised Selidosema humilima with Selidosema lupinata. Hudson discussed and illustrated this species under the name Selidosema lipinata in his 1928 book The butterflies and moths of New Zealand. In 1988 J. S. Dugdale discussed this species under the name Pseudocoremia lupinata. The male holotype is held at the Natural History Museum, London.

== Description ==
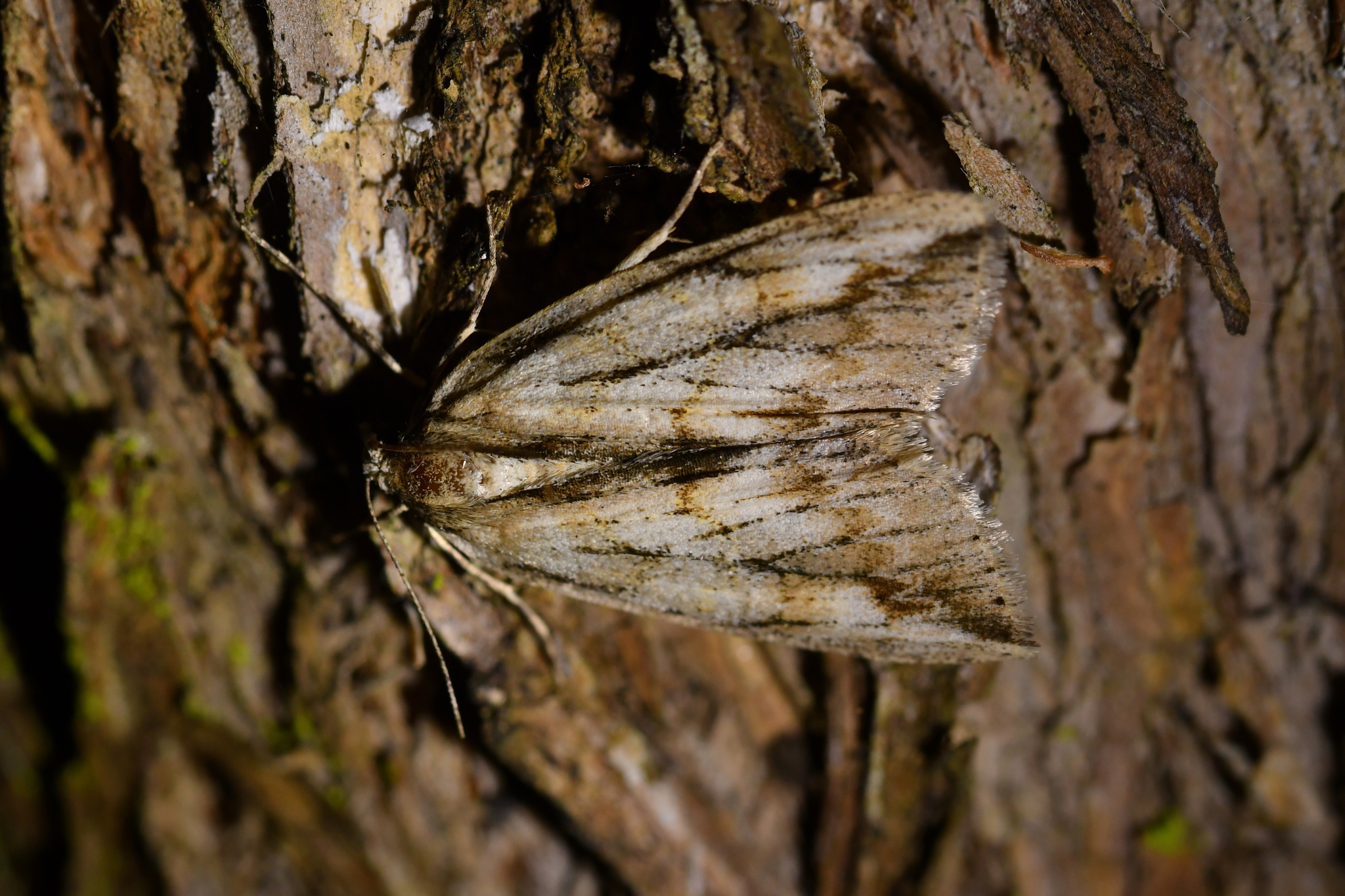

D. E. Gaskin described the egg of this species as follows:

The egg is covered with hexagonal depressions. It is oval, and pale green when first laid.

Gaskin described the larva of this species as follows:

The freshly emerged caterpillar is yellow. When fully grown it is about an inch and a quarter long and dark rather dull yellow with brownish mottling and darker brown markings. There are also a number of green markings on the back and sides.There are a few short black hairs.

George Hudson described the adult of the species as follows:

The expansion of the wings is from 1 1/4 to 1 3/8 inches. The fore-wings are pale dull pinkish-brown; there are three short oblique dark brown stripes on the costa, inclined very much towards the termen; the first of these stripes is distinctly double, and the second and third partially so; there is an indistinct brown mark just below the apex, several slender faint streaks on the veins near the middle of the wing, and a very distinct brown shading on the dorsum. The hind-wings are very pale ochreous. In the female the sub-apical marking is darker and both fore- and hind-wings are more or less sprinkled with brown.

== Distribution ==
This species is endemic to New Zealand. It can be found in both the North and South Islands from Auckland to Invercargill.

== Habitat ==
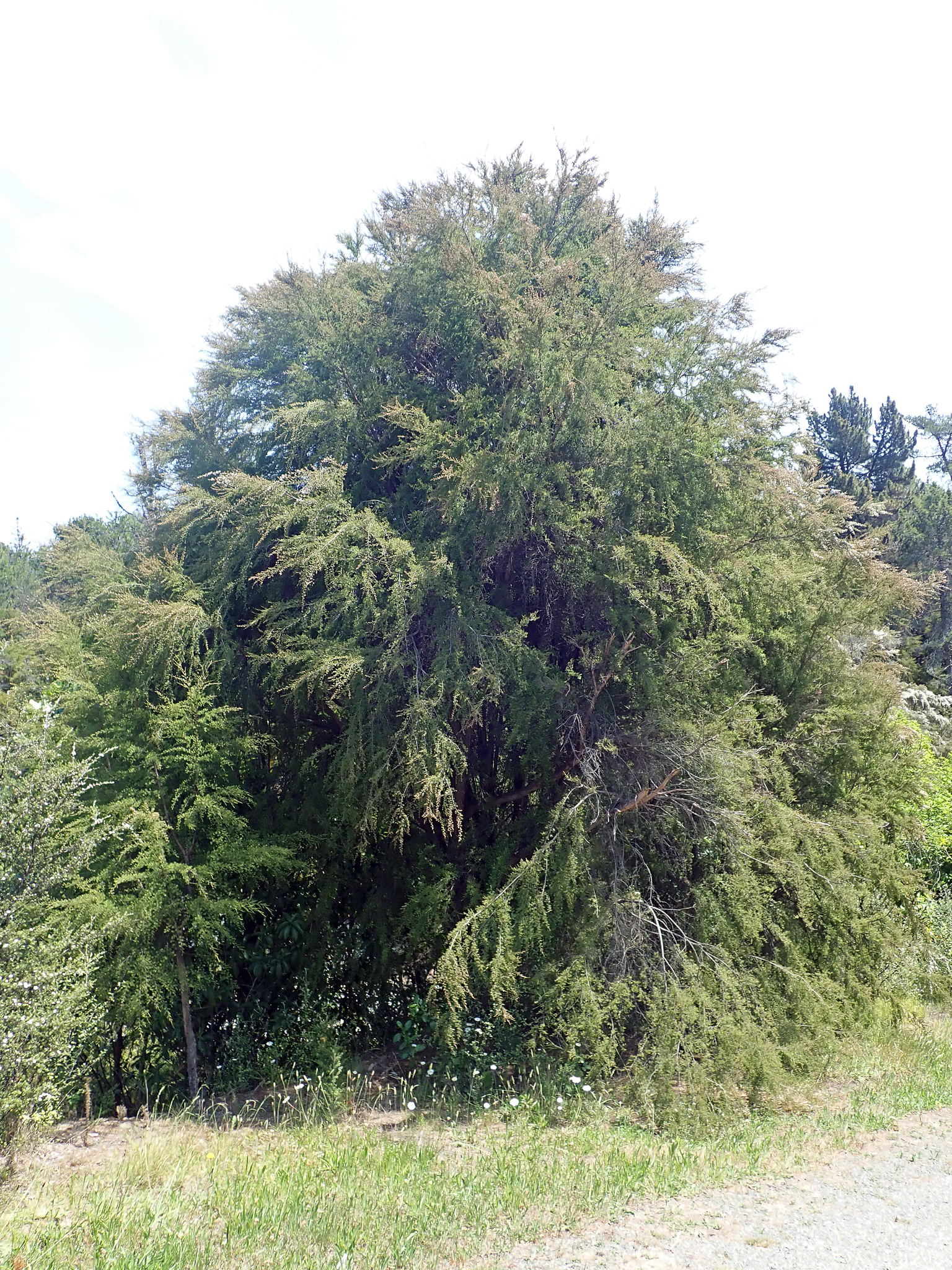
Favoured habitat and larval host Kunzea ericoides.

This species inhabits native forest including Kānuka scrubland.

== Life history and behaviour ==
The egg takes about two to three weeks to hatch. The larva feeds at night and remains unmoving during the day. This species pupates at ground level. The adult moths are said to be on the wing from December to June. However D. E. Gaskin hypothesised that there are two distinct generations of this moth a year. The adult moth is nocturnal and is attracted to light.

== Hosts ==
The larval plant hosts include species in the genus Kunzea.
