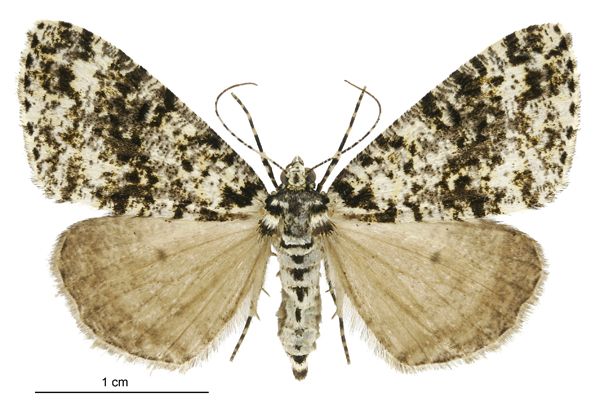
- Female
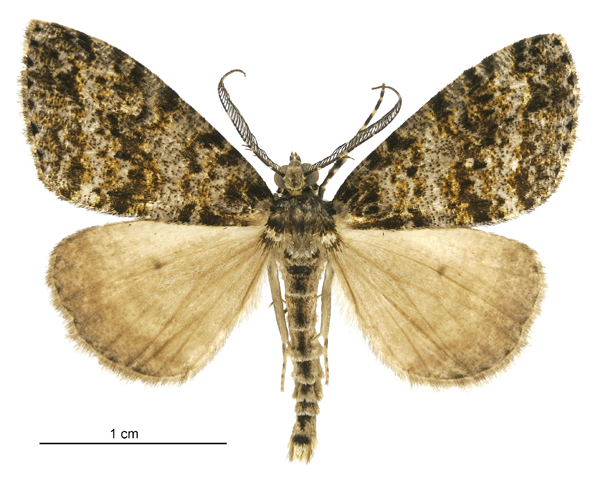
- Male

Scientific classification
- Kingdom: Animalia
- Phylum: Arthropoda
- Clade: Pancrustacea
- Class: Insecta
- Order: Lepidoptera
- Family: Geometridae
- Genus: Pseudocoremia
- Species: P. monacha

Binomial name
- Pseudocoremia monacha (Hudson, 1903)

Synonyms
- Selidosema monacha Hudson, 1903

= Pseudocoremia monacha =

Species of moth endemic to New Zealand

Pseudocoremia monacha is a species of moth in the family Geometridae. It is endemic to New Zealand. Adults of this species pollinate Veronica salicifolia.
