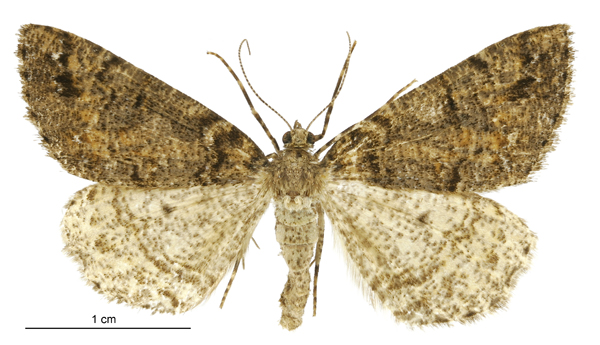
- Female
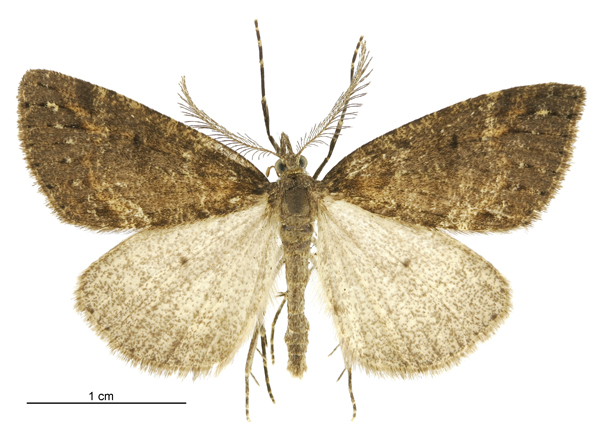
- Male

Scientific classification
- Kingdom: Animalia
- Phylum: Arthropoda
- Clade: Pancrustacea
- Class: Insecta
- Order: Lepidoptera
- Family: Geometridae
- Genus: Pseudocoremia
- Species: P. modica

Binomial name
- Pseudocoremia modica (Philpott, 1921)

Synonyms
- Selidosema modica Philpott, 1921

= Pseudocoremia modica =

Species of moth endemic to New Zealand

Pseudocoremia modica is a species of moth in the family Geometridae. It is endemic to New Zealand. This species was redescribed in 2007.
