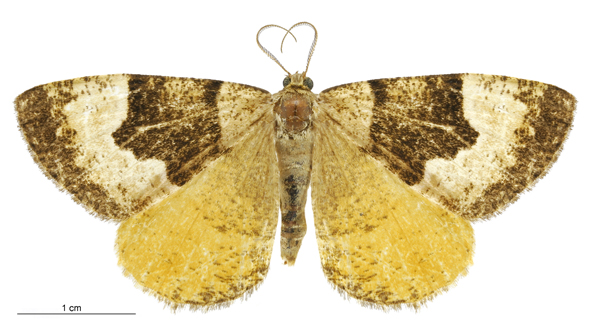
- Female

Scientific classification
- Kingdom: Animalia
- Phylum: Arthropoda
- Clade: Pancrustacea
- Class: Insecta
- Order: Lepidoptera
- Family: Geometridae
- Genus: Pseudocoremia
- Species: P. campbelli

Binomial name
- Pseudocoremia campbelli (Philpott, 1927)

Synonyms
- Selidosema campbelli Philpott, 1927

= Pseudocoremia campbelli =

Species of moth endemic to New Zealand

Pseudocoremia campbelli is a species of moth in the family Geometridae. This species was first described by Alfred Philpott in 1927. It is endemic to New Zealand and has been observed in the West Coast region of the South Island. Adults are on the wing in December and January and are attracted to UV light.

== Taxonomy ==
This species was first described by Alfred Philpott in 1927 and originally named Selidosema campbelli. George Hudson discussed and illustrated this species in his 1928 book The butterflies and moths of New Zealand. In 1988 John S. Dugdale placed this species in the genus Pseudocoremia. The female holotype specimen, collected by W. J. Campbell at Blackball, is held in the New Zealand Arthropod Collection.

== Description ==
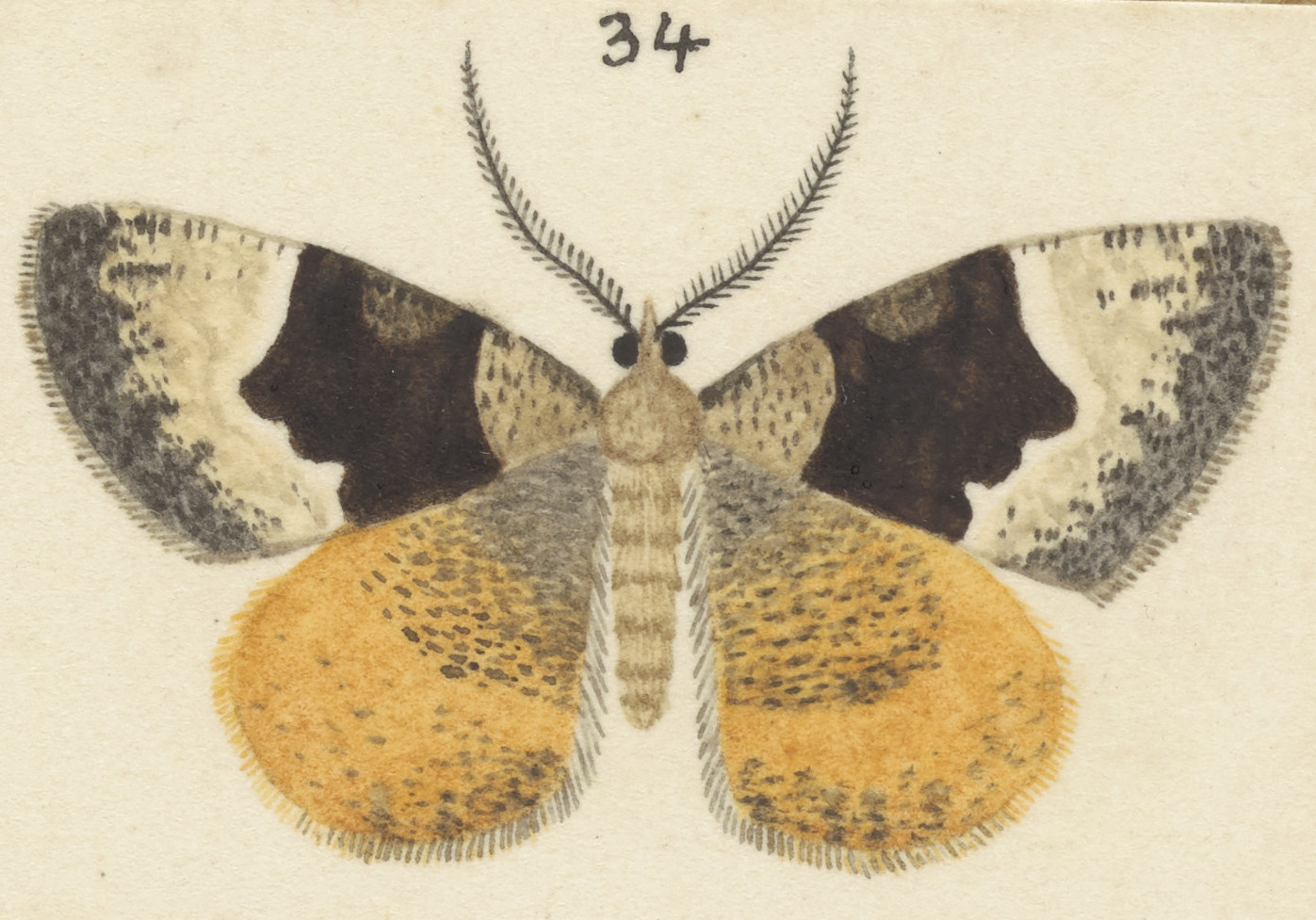
Hudson's illustration of the female holotype.

Philpott described this species as follows:

♀ 45 mm. Head smoke grey, ochreous behind, frons purplish-fuscous. Palpi purplish-fuscous, ochreous beneath. Antennae, shaft ochreous, pectinations black, 3 ½. (The pectinations appear to be much shorter than they are owing to their acute angulation with the shaft). Thorax (denuded). Abdomen greyish-ochreous. Legs ochreous, anterior pair infuscated and tarsi broadly banded with fuscous. Forewings elongate-triangular, costa moderately and uniformly arched, apex obtuse, termen bowed; basal fifth ochreous sprinkled with fuscous; a broad median band of fuscous-black mixed with ochreous, its anterior margin almost straight, its posterior margin with a broad blunt median projection; following the median band a broad area of white, slightly tinged with ochreous and traversed by a number of short fuscous strigae from costa; termen broadly fuscous, more narrowly towards tornus: fringes fuscous mixed with ochreous. Hind-wings bright ochreous sprinkled with fuscous on basal and dorsal areas: fringes ochreous mixed with fuscous, clear ochreous round apex.

Philpott pointed out that the pectinated antennae in the female is an unusual feature of this species.

== Distribution ==
This species is endemic to New Zealand. It has been observed in its type locality of Blackball as well as in the vicinity of Lewis Pass, both in the West Coast Region. This species is regarded as being rare.

== Behaviour ==
Adults are on the wing in December and January. The adult female is attracted to UV light.
