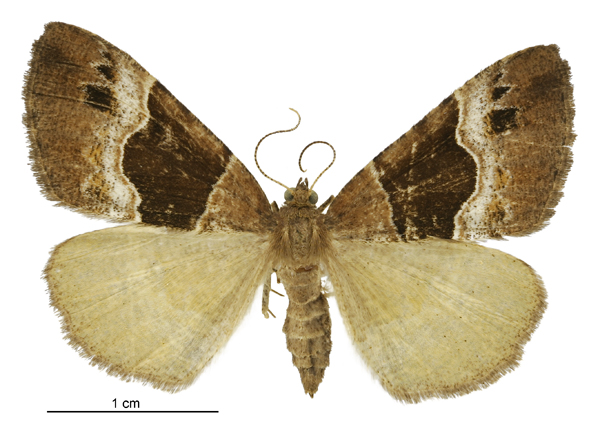
- Female
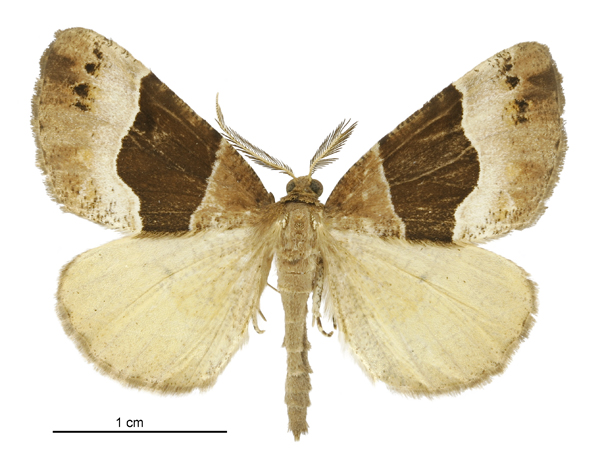
- Male

Scientific classification
- Kingdom: Animalia
- Phylum: Arthropoda
- Class: Insecta
- Order: Lepidoptera
- Family: Geometridae
- Genus: Pseudocoremia
- Species: P. pergrata

Binomial name
- Pseudocoremia pergrata (Philpott, 1930)

Synonyms
- Selidosema pergrata Philpott, 1930

= Pseudocoremia pergrata =

Species of moth endemic to New Zealand

Pseudocoremia pergrata is a species of moth in the family Geometridae. It is endemic to New Zealand. In 1988 J. S. Dugdale synonymised P. pergrata into this species, however in 2003 P. pergrata was reinstated as species separate from P. insignita.
