= Pseudocoremia hudsoni =

Scientific classification
- Kingdom: Animalia
- Phylum: Arthropoda
- Class: Insecta
- Order: Lepidoptera
- Family: Geometridae
- Genus: Pseudocoremia
- Species: P. hudsoni

Binomial name
- Pseudocoremia hudsoni Stephens, Gibbs &Patrick, 2007

Species of moth endemic to New Zealand

Pseudocoremia hudsoni is a species of moth in the family Geometridae. It is endemic to New Zealand.
