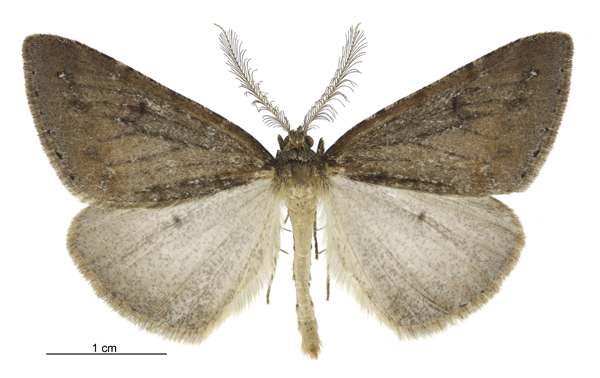

Scientific classification
- Kingdom: Animalia
- Phylum: Arthropoda
- Clade: Pancrustacea
- Class: Insecta
- Order: Lepidoptera
- Family: Geometridae
- Genus: Pseudocoremia
- Species: P. berylia

Binomial name
- Pseudocoremia berylia (Howes, 1943)

Synonyms
- Selidosema berylia Howes, 1943

= Pseudocoremia berylia =

Species of moth endemic to New Zealand

Pseudocoremia berylia is a species of moth in the family Geometridae. This species was first described by George Howes in 1943. It is endemic to New Zealand and found in the southern parts of the South Island. Adult males are on the wing from January until March and are attracted to light. Adult females have been hypothesised as being semi-apterous and incapable of flight. Larvae feed on plant species in the genus Celmisia.

== Taxonomy ==
This species was first described by George Howes in 1943 and originally named Selidosema berylia. George Hudson discussed and illustrated this species under that name in his 1950 book Fragments of New Zealand entomology. In 1988 John S. Dugdale discussed this species under the genus Pseudocoremia. The male holotype was collected by Beryl Sutherland who lived near the Homer Tunnel. She collected the specimen at the Homer Cirque in Fiordland. The holotype is held at Te Papa.

This species is named in Beryl Sutherland's honour.

== Description ==
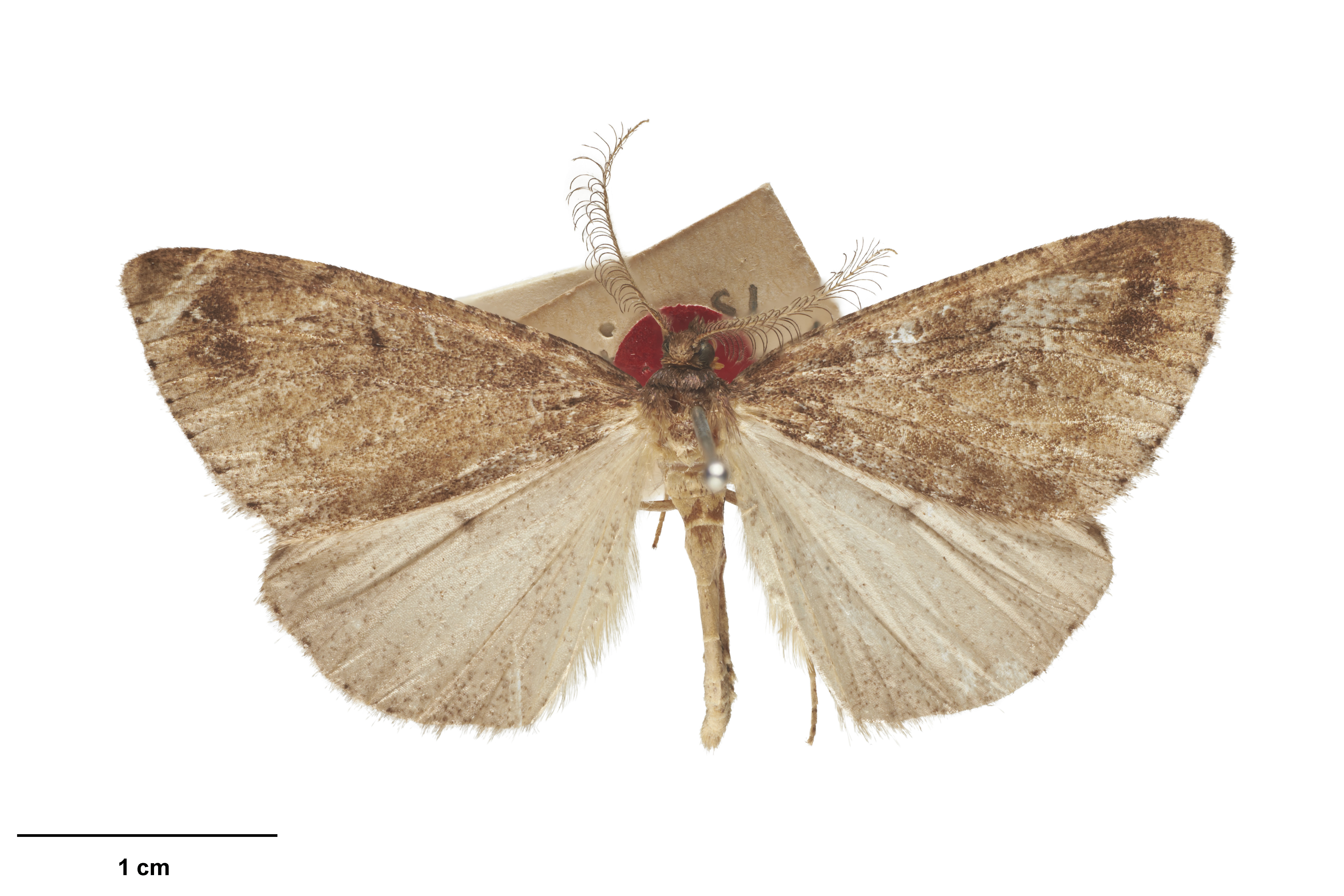
Male holotype collected by Beryl Sutherland.

Howes described this species as follows:

Head and thorax dark brown, abdomen ochreous. Antennal pectinations long—dark brown. Wing expanse 47 mm. Forewings dull coppery brown with markings indistinct, being but slightly darker than the general surface. Discal spot elongate and distinct. The basal line is very small. First line shows plainly on costa, is faintly indicated across wing and then again distinct on dorsum. Second line also faint in centre of wing with a sharp angulation outwards just above dorsum. Subterminal line faintly indicated except near apex, where three or four dots form a dark area. One or two of these dark marks have white dots on their terminal side. All these lines are faint, being but slightly darker than the general surface of the wings, and they vary in intensity slightly in different specimens. The veins are lightly outlined in darker ending in a terminal series of black dots. Cilia brownish grey. Underwings grey-white with minute dots of darker grey. Cilia ochreous-white. Discal dot small but plainly indicated.

Howes pointed out that the size of specimens are fairly consistent varying from 42 to 47mm. He also stated there was very little variation in the appearance of specimens apart from the depth of colour which can be lighter in some specimens. Hudson described this species as being dull coloured but said in some specimens the forewings are lighter brown and tinged ochreous. Both Howes and Hudson hypothesised that the female of this species is semi-apterous and incapable of flight.

== Distribution ==
This species is endemic to New Zealand and is found in the southern parts of the South Island.

== Hosts ==
Larvae of this species feed on plants in the genus Celmisia, scraping leaves.

== Behaviour ==
The adults of this species are on the wing from January to March and are attracted to light.
