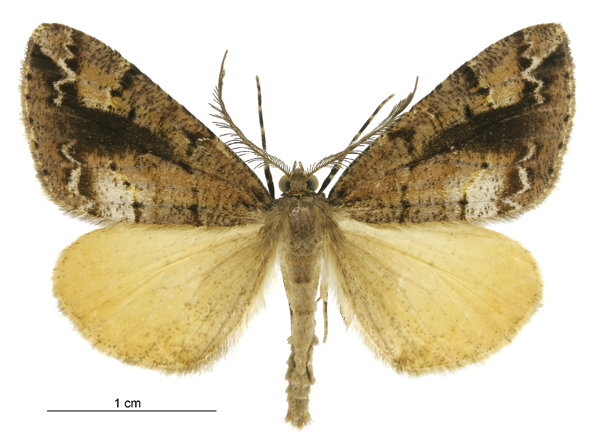
- Male

Scientific classification
- Kingdom: Animalia
- Phylum: Arthropoda
- Clade: Pancrustacea
- Class: Insecta
- Order: Lepidoptera
- Family: Geometridae
- Genus: Pseudocoremia
- Species: P. amaculata

Binomial name
- Pseudocoremia amaculata Stephens & Gibbs, 2003

= Pseudocoremia amaculata =

Species of moth endemic to New Zealand

Pseudocoremia amaculata is a species of moth in the family Geometridae. It is endemic to New Zealand and has been observed at St Arnaud. As at 2003 the female of this species is unknown. This species has been shown to be parasitised by species of wasps in the genera Aleiodes, Casinaria and Glyptapanteles.

== Taxonomy ==
This species was first described by Andréa Stephens and George Gibbs in 2003. J. S. Dugdale mentioned the species in his 1988 publication as one of two undescribed species in the genus Pseudocoremia. The male holotype specimen collected by Dugdale at St Arnaud Village in 1983 is held at the New Zealand Arthropod Collection.

== Description ==
The forewing length of the male of this species is between 15 and 16 mm. Stephens and Gibbs described the species as follows:

Forewings: relatively uniform medium brown across the entire surface, basal line and the median lines very faint, terminal line very faint zig-zag, below the apex across the terminal line is a darker brown poorly defined smear. Hindwings: completely yellow with no evidence of peppering. Antennae: bipectinate, with the longest pectinations extending to around 1875μm with pectinations becoming shorter towards the tip of the antennae, distal 22% of antennae without pectinations.

As at 2003 the female of this species is unknown.

== Distribution ==
This species is endemic to New Zealand. It has been collected only at St Arnaud. Stephens and Gibbs mentioned a specimen collected at the Hapuka Scenic Reserve near Kaikōura that may be P. amaculata. However, as a result of that specimen being more strongly marked there is doubt about this designation.

== Behaviour ==
Species in the genus Pseudocoremia are nocturnal and are attracted to light.

== Predators ==
This species has been studied and found to have been parasitised by species of wasps in the genera Aleiodes, Casinaria and Glyptapanteles.
