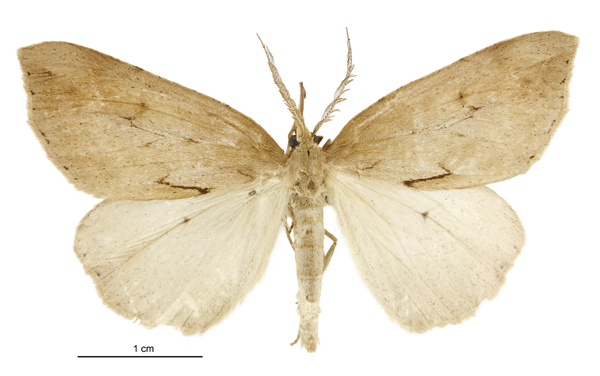
- Male
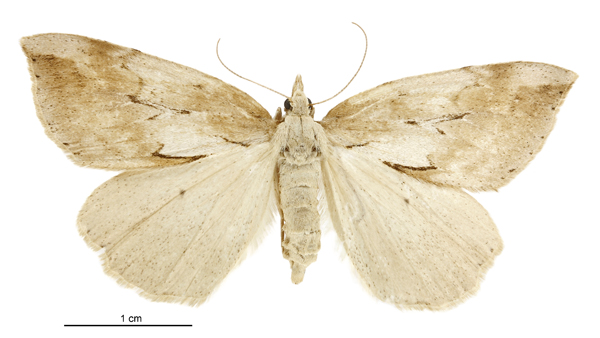
- Female

Scientific classification
- Kingdom: Animalia
- Phylum: Arthropoda
- Class: Insecta
- Order: Lepidoptera
- Family: Geometridae
- Genus: Pseudocoremia
- Species: P. lutea

Binomial name
- Pseudocoremia lutea (Philpott, 1914)

Synonyms
- Selidosema lutea Philpott, 1914

= Pseudocoremia lutea =

Species of moth

Pseudocoremia lutea is a species of moth in the family Geometridae. It is endemic to New Zealand. It is classified as "At Risk, Naturally Uncommon" by the Department of Conservation.

== Taxonomy ==
This species was first described by Alfred Philpott in 1914 using specimens collected at Bold Peak, Humboldt Range by C. Fenwick and George Howes in December and January. Philpott named the species Selidosema lutea. George Hudson, using the same name, described and illustrated this species in his 1928 book The Butterflies and Moths of New Zealand. In 1988 John S. Dugdale assigned the species to the genus Pseudocoremia. The holotype specimen is held at the Museum of New Zealand Te Papa Tongarewa.

== Description ==
Philpott described the species as follows:

♂︎. 47 mm. Head, palpi, and thorax dull yellowish-brown, face paler. Antennae moderately bipectinated, yellowish - brown. Abdomen pale yellow-brown. Forewings strongly arched at base, costa faintly sinuate, apex subacute, termen sinuate, rounded beneath, oblique; dull yellowish-brown with a few scattered blackish scales, most plentiful near apex; basal line indicated by a few blackish scales at dorsum; first line much interrupted, dentate, black, most pronounced as an inwardly oblique mark on dorsum; a series of obscure interneural black dots on termen : cilia dull yellowish-brown with obscure darker line. Hindwings, termen sinuate; very pale yellowish-brown; a prominent black discal dot and some black scales round termen : cilia pale yellowish-brown with faint darker line and tips whitish.

== Distribution ==
This species is endemic to New Zealand. This species can only be found in the Otago Lakes area.

== Biology and host species ==
The biology and host species of this moth is unknown.

== Conservation status ==
This species has been classified under the New Zealand Threat Classification system as being "At Risk, Naturally Uncommon".
