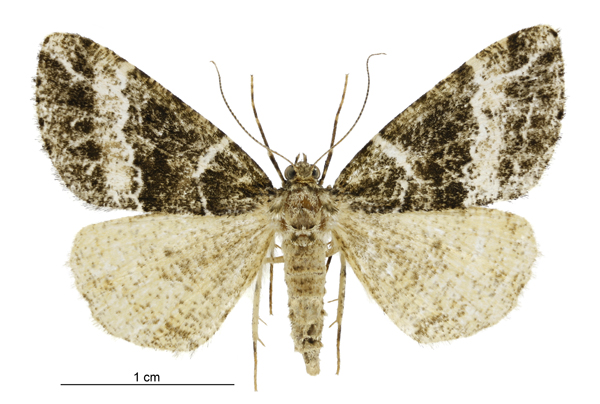
- Female
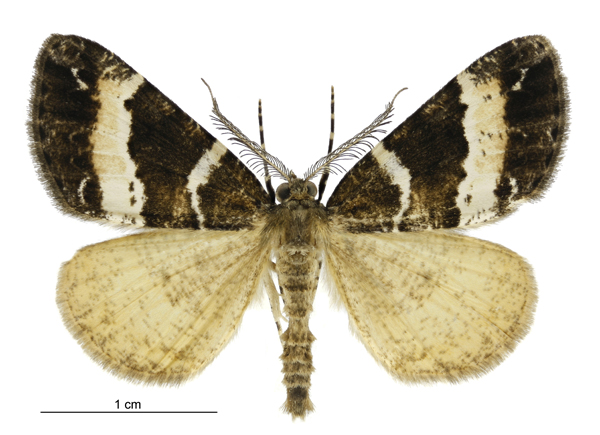
- Male

Conservation status
- Naturally Uncommon (NZ TCS)

Scientific classification
- Kingdom: Animalia
- Phylum: Arthropoda
- Clade: Pancrustacea
- Class: Insecta
- Order: Lepidoptera
- Family: Geometridae
- Genus: Pseudocoremia
- Species: P. dugdalei

Binomial name
- Pseudocoremia dugdalei Stephens & Gibbs, 2003

= Pseudocoremia dugdalei =

Species of moth endemic to New Zealand

Pseudocoremia dugdalei is a species of moth in the family Geometridae. It is endemic to New Zealand and has been observed in the North and South Islands. This species is known to inhabit coastal sites and is associated with kānuka forest. The larvae of this species and the larval host are unknown. Adults are on the wing from November until March. P. dugdalei has been classified as "at risk, naturally uncommon" as a result of being biologically sparse.

== Taxonomy ==
This species was first described by Andrea E. A. Stephens and George W. Gibbs in 2003. The male holotype, collected at Fletcher Track in the Waitākere Ranges, is held at the New Zealand Arthropod Collection.

This species is named in honour of John S. Dugdale.

== Description ==
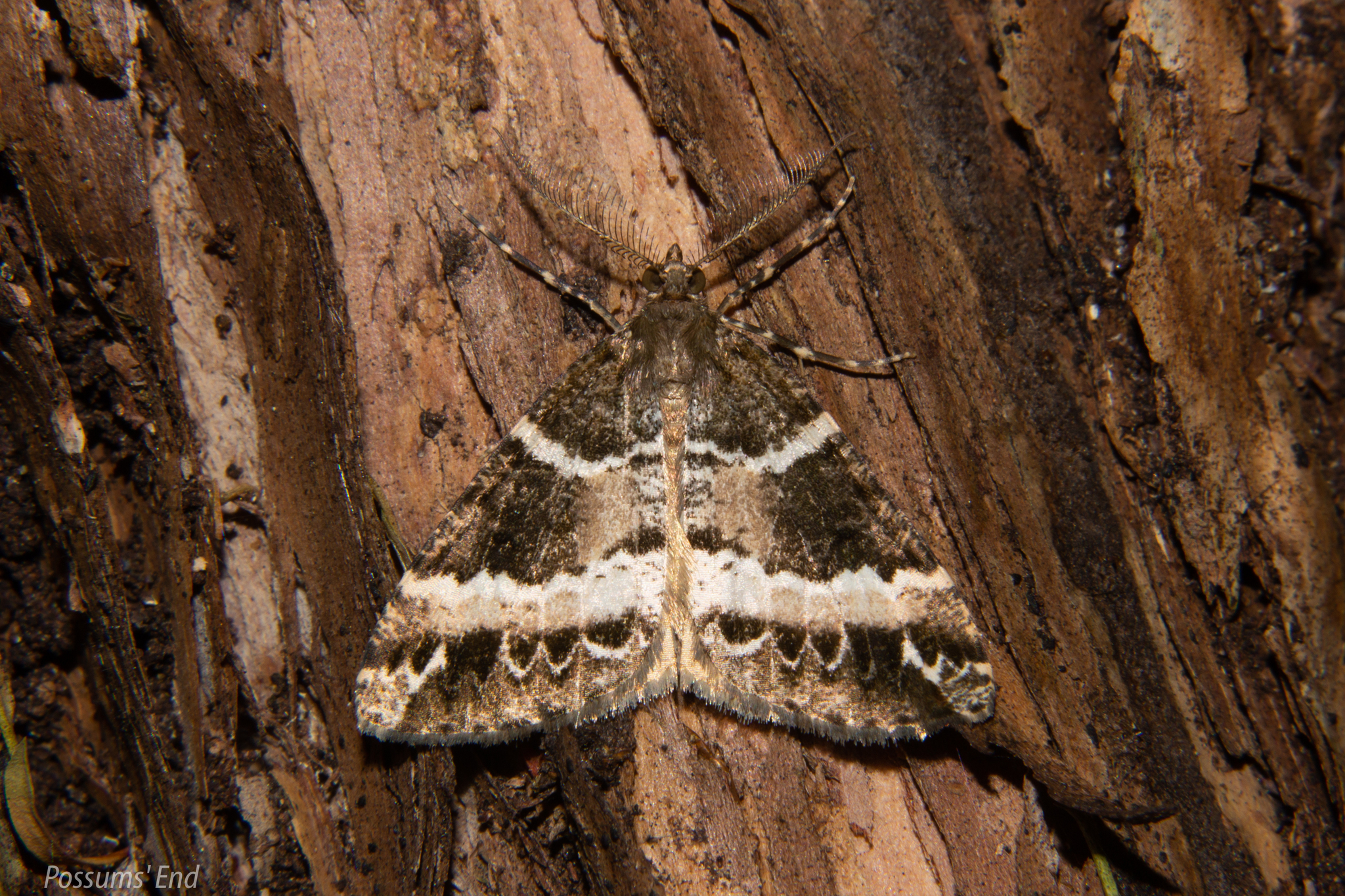
P. dugdalei at rest.

The wingspan of P. dugdalei is between 28 and 34 mm. This species can be distinguished from others in the genus Pseudocoremia as its forewings have a blotchy yellowish brown ground colour with two white bands both running parallel to the forewing termen. The first band is broad and the second is narrower but both are uninterrupted.

== Distribution ==
This species is endemic to New Zealand. Although observed in both the North and South Islands this species is known from widely scattered sites.

== Habitat and hosts ==
This species has been collected at coastal sites and is associated with kānuka forest. The larvae and larval host is unknown.

== Behaviour ==
Adults of this species are on the wing from November until March. This species is attracted to light. However it has been hypothesised that this species is, at most, weakly attracted to standard mercury vapour light traps. Thus the supposed rarity of this species may be because of its failure to be detected.

== Conservation status ==
In 2025 this species was classified under the New Zealand Threat Classification system as being "at risk, naturally uncommon".
