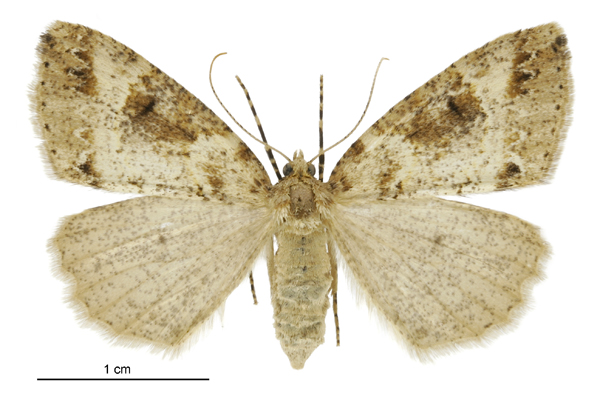
- Female
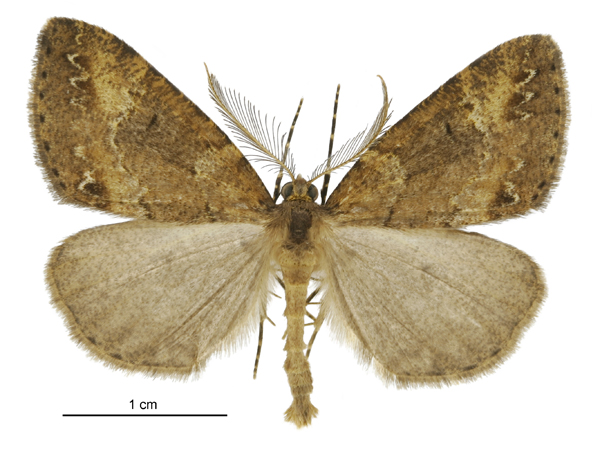
- Male

Scientific classification
- Kingdom: Animalia
- Phylum: Arthropoda
- Clade: Pancrustacea
- Class: Insecta
- Order: Lepidoptera
- Family: Geometridae
- Genus: Pseudocoremia
- Species: P. ombrodes

Binomial name
- Pseudocoremia ombrodes (Meyrick, 1902)

Synonyms
- Selidosema ombrodes Meyrick, 1902

= Pseudocoremia ombrodes =

Species of moth endemic to New Zealand

Pseudocoremia ombrodes is a species of moth in the family Geometridae. It was first described by Edward Meyrick in 1902. It is endemic to New Zealand and is only found in the Chatham Islands. P. ombrodes inhabits native forest. Larvae are hosted by a range of trees and shrubs including species of Veronica. Adults are on the wing from December to February and again from May to August. The female of the species has wings that are narrower and sharper in appearance in comparison to the male.

== Taxonomy ==
This species was first described by Edward Meyrick in 1902 and originally named Selidosema ombrodes. George Hudson discussed and illustrated this species under that name in his 1928 book The butterflies and moths of New Zealand. In 1977 Jeremy Daniel Holloway discussed and illustrated S. ombrodes when distinguishing it from Selidosema christiani. In 1988 John S. Dugdale placed this moth in the genus Pseudocoremia. The male lectotype collected by James Fougère at Chatham Island, is held at the Natural History Museum, London.

== Description ==
Female at rest.

Male at rest.

Meyrick described this species as follows:

♂♀. 32-36 m.m. Head and thorax varying from fuscous to brownish-ochreous. Antennal pectinations in ♂ very long (16), extending to near apex. Abdomen pale ochreous-yellowish, sprinkled with fuscous, in ♂ rather elongate. Legs rather dark fuscous, ringed with whitish-ochreous, posterior tibiae in ♂ little dilated. Fore-wings rather elongate-triangular, costa moderately arched, apex obtuse, termen somewhat oblique, rounded ; light ochreous, more or less largely suffused with brown, and strigulated with dark fuscous ; first and second lines dark fuscous, usually indistinct, first strongly curved, second somewhat irregular, hardly curved on upper 3/4 thence obliquely bent inwards ; an indistinct transverse blackish discal mark ; usually a pale costal spot beyond second line ; in one ♀ conspicuous pale fascial on each side of median band ; subterminal line indistinct, sometimes partially whitish, waved-dentate : cilia rather dark fuscous. Hindwings with termen rounded, gently waved ; rather light grey, indistinctly strigulated with darker ; cilia pale grey.

Meyrick stated that this species can be distinguished from similar appearing species as it is larger and more somber coloured, has grey hind-wings and in the male very long antennal pectinations. The wings of the female are are narrower and sharper in appearance than that of the male.

== Distribution ==
P. ombrodes is endemic to New Zealand and only found in the Chatham Islands. It is regarded as being very common.

== Habitat and hosts ==
This species inhabits native forest. The larvae of this species is hosted by a range of trees and shrubs including species of Veronica.

== Behaviour ==
The adults of this species are on the wing from December to February and again from May to August.
