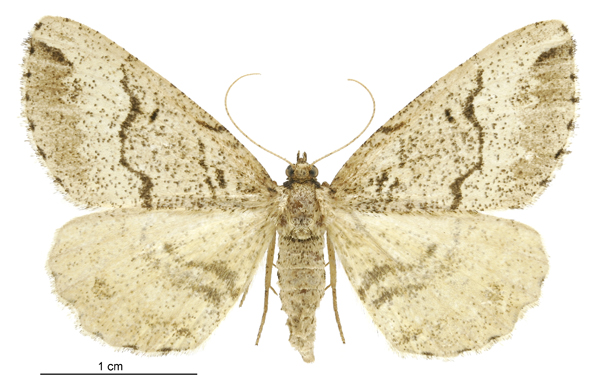
- female
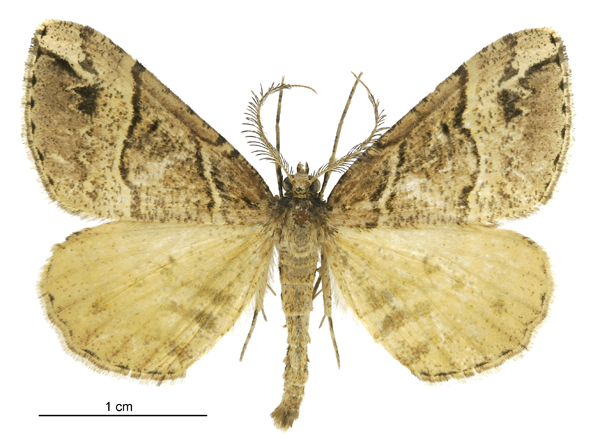
- Male

Scientific classification
- Kingdom: Animalia
- Phylum: Arthropoda
- Clade: Pancrustacea
- Class: Insecta
- Order: Lepidoptera
- Family: Geometridae
- Genus: Pseudocoremia
- Species: P. melinata

Binomial name
- Pseudocoremia melinata (Felder & Rogenhofer, 1875)

Synonyms
- Numeria melinata Felder & Rogenhofer, 1875; Selidosema melinata (Felder & Rogenhofer, 1875); Selidosema pungata Felder & Rogenhofer, 1875; Selidosema scariphota Meyrick, 1915; Pseudocoremia scariphota (Meyrick, 1915)

= Pseudocoremia melinata =

Species of moth endemic to New Zealand

Pseudocoremia melinata, also known as the broom flash, is a moth of the family Geometridae. This species was first described by Cajetan Felder and Alois Friedrich Rogenhofer in 1875. It is endemic to New Zealand and can be found throughout the North and South Islands. P. melinata inhabits the margins of native forest and scrubland and can also be found in New Zealand beech forests. The larvae feed on species of Carmichaelia including Carmichaelia australis and Carmichaelia petriei. Adults are on the wing from November until March. Adults have been recorded as feeding on the pollen and likely pollenating the flowers of Hoheria lyallii. They are very variable in appearance. In flight they attract attention as a result of their eye catching light coloured hind wings. Once at rest, with their hind wings hidden, the moth seems to disappear.

== Taxonomy ==
This species was first described by Cajetan Felder and Alois Friedrich Rogenhofer in 1875 and originally named Numeria melinata. In the same publication these authors also named this moth Selidosema pungata. In 1927 S. pungata was synonymised by Louis Beethoven Prout with Selidosema melinata. In 1883 and in more detail in 1884, Edward Meyrick described this species under the name Pseudocoremia melinata. In 1897 Meyrick, thinking he was describing a new species, named this moth Selidosema cremnopa. Prout, again in 1927, synonymised this name with Selidosema melinata. George Hudson discussed and illustrated this species under the name Selidosema melinata in both this 1898 book New Zealand moths and butterflies (Macro-lepidoptera) and his 1928 book The butterflies and moths of New Zealand. In 1915 Edward Meyrick, thinking he was describing a new species, named this moth Selidosema scariphota. This name was synonymised by Alfred Philpott in 1931. In 1988 John S. Dugdale confirmed this species placement in the genus Pseudocoremia and upheld Prout's synonymies. This placement was also followed in the New Zealand inventory of biodiversity. The female holotype, collected by Thomas R. Oxley in Nelson, is held at the Natural History Museum, London.

== Description ==
Meyrick described the adults of this species as follows:

Male, female. —26-34 mm. Forewings moderate, hindmargin rounded ; in male white, in female whitish-grey, irrorated with blackish, and often dark olive-green; markings strong, blackish, generally suffused with dull olive-green ; two irregular dentate curved or angulated parallel lines towards base; a sinuate line before middle, very variable in strength and intensity ; two dentate sinuate parallel lines somewhat beyond middle, second sometimes obsolete; two dentate parallel subterminal lines, first much more strongly marked; a hindmarginal row of black dots. Hind-wings moderate, hindmargin rounded ; in male whitish-ochreous, in female light brownish-ochreous; often partially or wholly irrorated with grey ; base or hindmargin sometimes suffused with grey; generally a grey discal dot, subterminal line, and hindmarginal row of dots.

Meyrick pointed out that this species is very variable but that he believed the dull green tinge of the species was characteristic.

The larvae is about 3/4 inch long ; dull green with darker longitudinal striations.

=== Gallery ===
Larva

Female

Male bred from larva

Male

Male

== Distribution ==
P. melinata is endemic to New Zealand. It is found throughout the North and South Islands.

== Habitat and hosts ==
C. australis.

This species inhabits the margins of native forest and scrubland. It can also found in New Zealand beech forests where it has been observed at altitudes of between 1,000 feet (300 m) to 3,000 feet (910 m). The larvae feed on species in the genus Carmichaelia including Carmichaelia australis and Carmichaelia petriei. Larvae have been successfully reared on these two species.

== Behaviour ==
Adults are on the wing from November until March. When in flight the light hind wings of this species catch the eye. Once at rest, with the hind wings hidden, this moth seems to disappear. Adults have been observed visiting, feeding from and likely pollenating the flowers of Hoheria lyallii.
