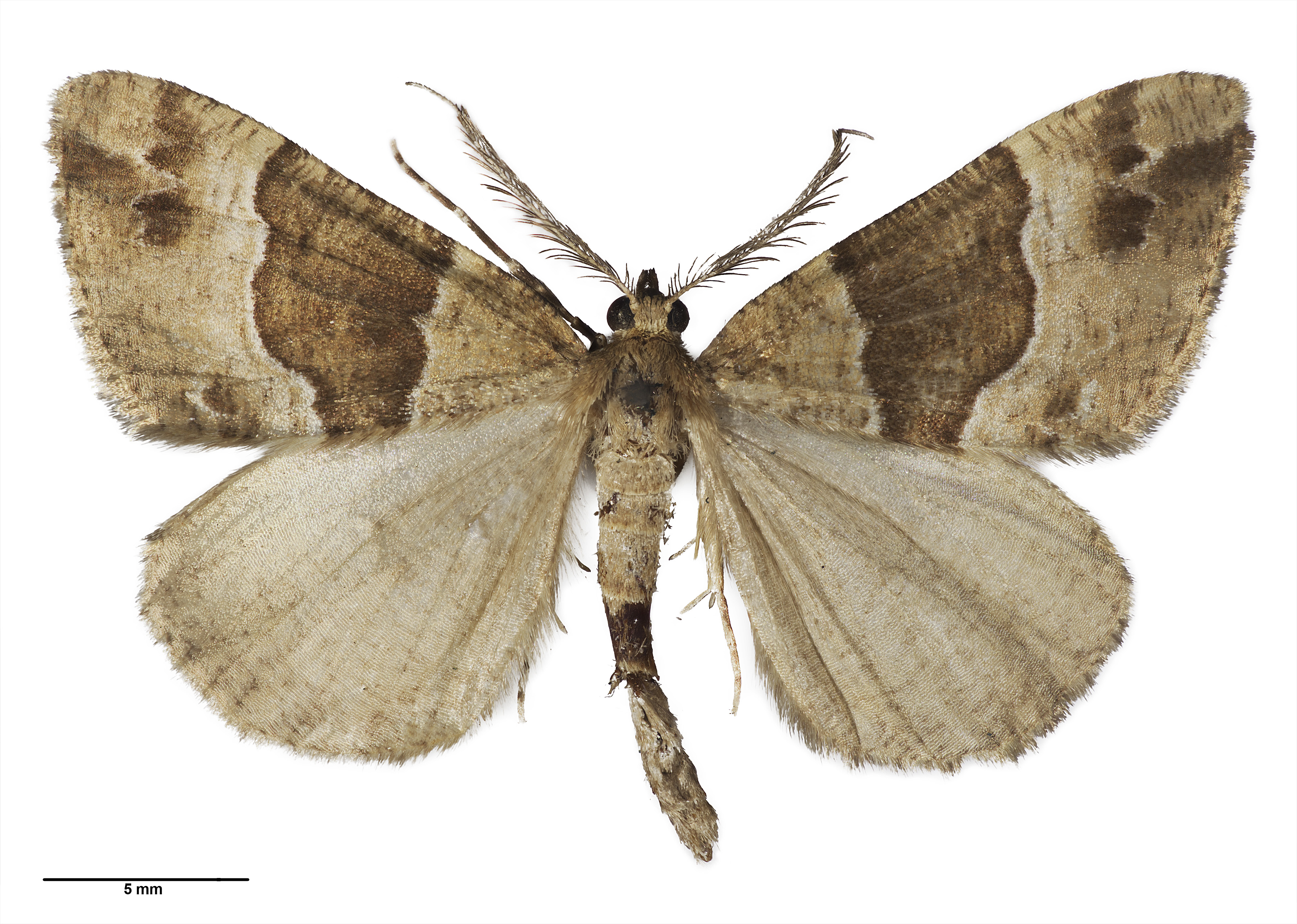
- Male holotype specimen of Pseudocoremia insignita

Scientific classification
- Kingdom: Animalia
- Phylum: Arthropoda
- Clade: Pancrustacea
- Class: Insecta
- Order: Lepidoptera
- Family: Geometridae
- Subfamily: Ennominae
- Tribe: Boarmiini
- Genus: Pseudocoremia; Butler, 1877

= Pseudocoremia =

Genus of moths

Pseudocoremia is a genus of moths in the family Geometridae erected by Arthur Gardiner Butler in 1877. The type species for this genus is Selidosema fragosata by original designation. This genus is endemic to New Zealand.

== Species ==
Species include:

- Pseudocoremia albafasciata (Philpott, 1915)
- Pseudocoremia amaculata Stephens & Gibbs, 2003
- Pseudocoremia berylia (Howes, 1943)
- Pseudocoremia campbelli (Philpott, 1927)
- Pseudocoremia cineracia (Howes, 1942
- Pseudocoremia colpogramma (Meyrick, 1936)
- Pseudocoremia dugdalei Stephens & Gibbs, 2003
- Pseudocoremia fascialata (Philpott, 1903)
- Pseudocoremia fenerata (Felder & Rogenhofer, 1875)
- Pseudocoremia flava Warren, 1896
- Pseudocoremia fluminea (Philpott, 1926)
- Pseudocoremia hudsoni Stephens, Gibbs & Patrick, 2007
- Pseudocoremia indistincta Butler, 1877
- Pseudocoremia insignita (Philpott, 1930)
- Pseudocoremia lactiflua (Meyrick, 1912)
- Pseudocoremia leucelaea (Meyrick, 1909)
- Pseudocoremia lupinata (Felder & Rogenhofer, 1875)
- Pseudocoremia lutea (Philpott, 1914)
- Pseudocoremia melinata (Felder & Rogenhofer, 1875)
- Pseudocoremia modica (Philpott, 1921)
- Pseudocoremia monacha (Hudson, 1903)
- Pseudocoremia ombrodes Meyrick, 1902
- Pseudocoremia pergrata (Philpott, 1930)
- Pseudocoremia productata (Walker, 1862)
- Pseudocoremia rudisata (Walker, 1862)
- Pseudocoremia suavis Butler, 1879 – common forest looper
- Pseudocoremia terrena Philpott, 1915
