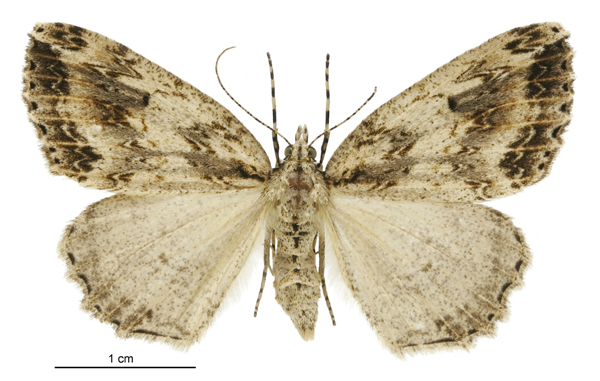
- Female

Scientific classification
- Kingdom: Animalia
- Phylum: Arthropoda
- Clade: Pancrustacea
- Class: Insecta
- Order: Lepidoptera
- Family: Geometridae
- Genus: Pseudocoremia
- Species: P. rudisata

Binomial name
- Pseudocoremia rudisata (Walker, 1862)

Synonyms
- Cidaria rudisata Walker, 1862; Selidosema rudisata (Walker, 1862); Selidosema rudiata Meyrick, 1891 - unjustified emendation; Boarmia astrapia Meyrick, 1980; Boarmia rudiata (Meyrick, 1891)

= Pseudocoremia rudisata =

Species of moth endemic to New Zealand

Pseudocoremia rudisata is a species of moth in the family Geometridae. This species was first described by Francis Walker in 1862. It is endemic to New Zealand and is found in the North, South and Stewart Islands. This species inhabits native forest and scrubland. The larval hosts of this moth include species in the genus Olearia and Brachyglottis repanda. Adults are on the wing throughout the year but are most commonly observed from October until January. Larvae and adults are nocturnal with adults being attracted to light.

== Taxonomy ==
This species was first described by Francis Walker in 1862 and originally named Cidaria rudisata. Edward Meyrick described this species in 1891 under the name Selidosema rudiata, an unjustified emendation. George Hudson, following Meyrick, used this same name when he discussed and illustrated this species in 1898 and again in 1928. In 1988 John S. Dugdale placed this species in the genus Pseudocoremia.

=== Subspecies ===
This species has two subspecies;

- Pseudocoremia rudisata ampla (Hudson, 1923)
- Pseudocoremia rudisata rudisata (Walker, 1862)

== Description ==
P. r. rudisata has a darker appearance as it is covered with larger blotches of colour than P. r. ampla.

== Distribution ==
This species is endemic to New Zealand. P. r. rudisata is mainly found in the North Island. P. r. ampla occurs in the South and Stewart Islands.

== Habitat and hosts ==
This species inhabits native forest and scrubland. The larval hosts of this moth are species in the genus Olearia, which include Olearia arborescens, O. bullata, O. fimbriata, O. fragrantissima and O. odorata. Larvae have also been observed feeding on the leaves of Brachyglottis repanda.

== Behaviour ==
Adults are on the wing throughout the year but are most commonly observed from October until January. Both the larvae and adults are active at night. Adults are attracted to light and have been collected via a mercury vapour light trap.
