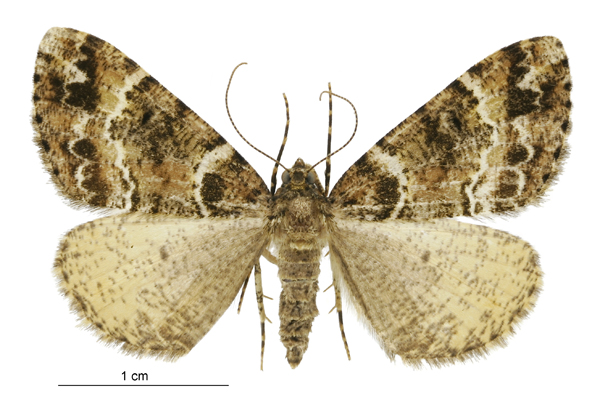
- Female
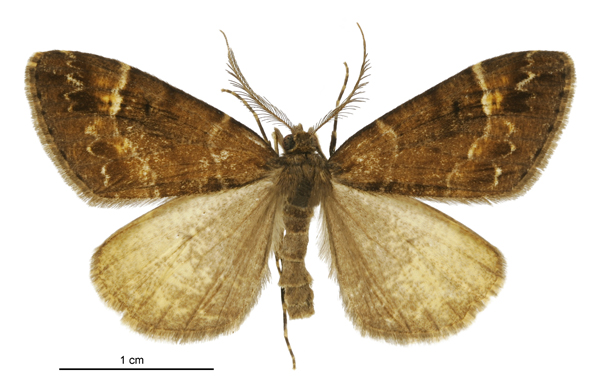
- Male

Scientific classification
- Kingdom: Animalia
- Phylum: Arthropoda
- Class: Insecta
- Order: Lepidoptera
- Family: Geometridae
- Genus: Pseudocoremia
- Species: P. productata

Binomial name
- Pseudocoremia productata (Walker, 1862)

Synonyms
- Larentia productata Walker, 1862

= Pseudocoremia productata =

Species of moth endemic to New Zealand

Pseudocoremia productata was first described by Walker as Larentia productata. The species has previously been referred to as "The Rata Moth" or the "Brown Forest Moth". It is now commonly known as the "Brown Forest Flash". The genus would later be categorised as Selidosema before Walker redescribed the species as Pseudocoremia productata in 1862. This species of endemic moth belongs to the family Geometridae, commonly known as geometer mothsor inchworms. Many species within this family are well camouflaged to resemble twigs, dead leaves, or tree bark.

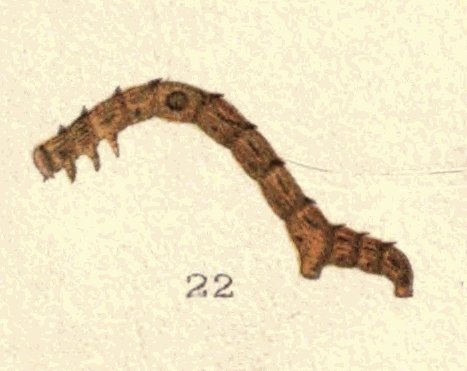

== Description ==
Adult Pseudocoremia productata are sexually dimorphic and are identifiable by their wings, antennae, and external genitalic characteristics. Its name "Brown Forest Flash" is associated with the flashing of its pale hind wings when flying and the ability to conceal itself on forest tree trunks. This characteristic is known as "Protective Resemblance". It is a term that describes colour or forms that allow a species to closely resemble its surroundings to escape the notice of its natural enemies.

Females have pectinate antennae, which are comb-like filiform structures. In contrast, males have bipectinate antennae where comb-like structures are present on both sides of the main shaft. Their heads display short palpi which aid in taste and touch, "projecting a short distance in front of the eyes". The posterior margins of the abdomen are segments and possess lateral tufts. In females, the ovipositor tip extends past the distal abdomen.

A male's wingspan can reach up to 1 3/8 inches (35 mm) whereas a female's wingspan may reach 1 1/8 inches (29 mm). The forewings have distinctive wavy patterns that "vary from pale yellowish-brown to rich chocolate brown". During resting state, the hind-wings tuck under the forewings allowing this moth to be undetectable due to its patterns and colours. Its predominant colours are dark reddish-brown, mottled with patches of creamy white and pale green and scattered isolated hairs. The patterns feature two curved lines near the base, with a lighter stripe enclosed between them. A wide, dark central area is followed by a wavy pale line formed by a light irregular band composed of two partially disconnected patches, one on the leading front edge of the wing and the other on the trailing edge of the wing. Additionally, a jagged, whitish transverse line is present near the termen and curves toward the dorsum. Patterns typically include several dark streaks that stand out against the ground colour and in some females, cloudy white patches may be present on forewings. Hindwings are ochreous and display mottled greyish browns.

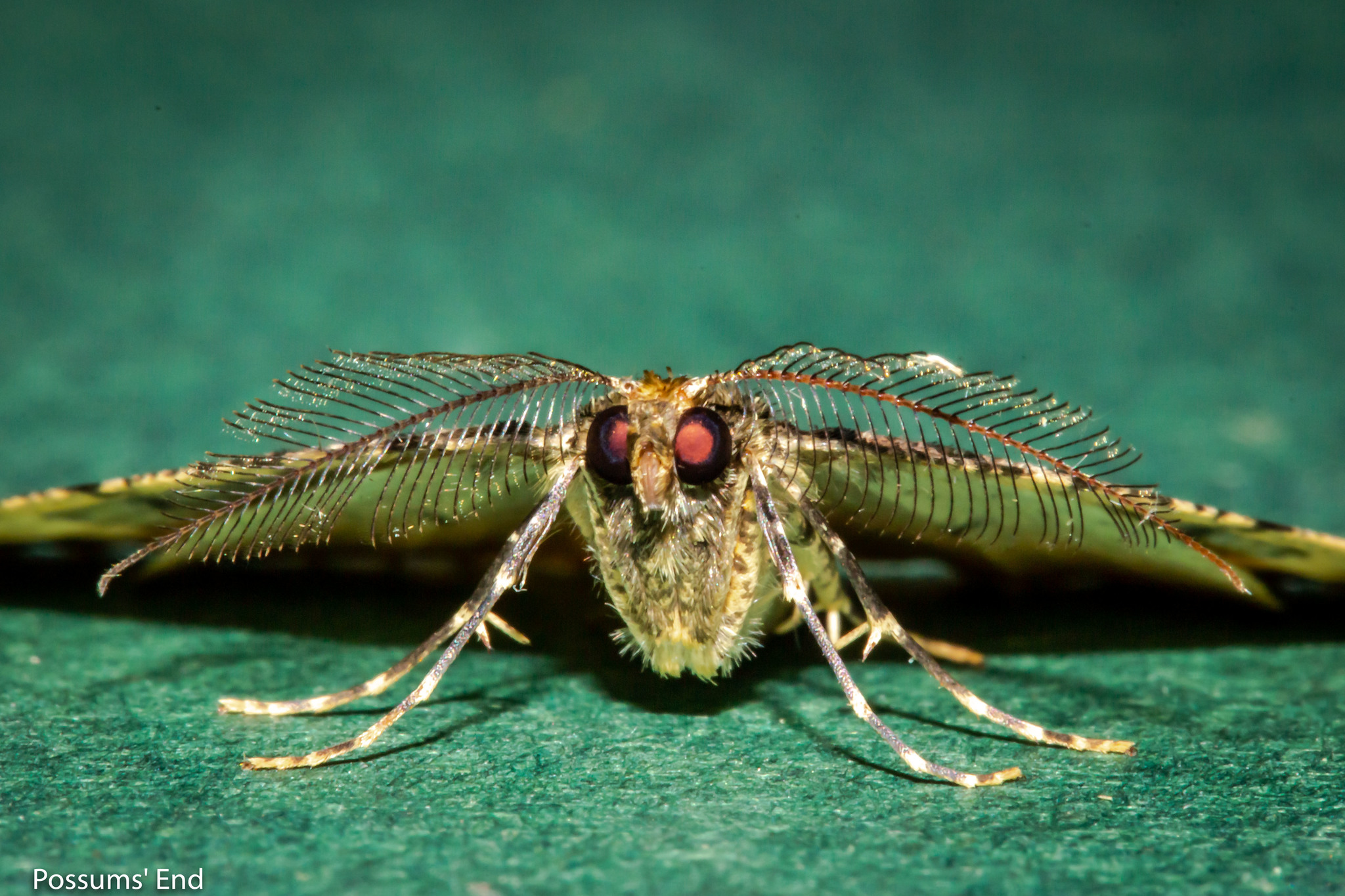

== Range ==
=== Natural global range ===
Pseudocoremia productata is endemic to New Zealand and is distributed along both the North and Sound islands including Stewart Island. This moth appears from October till May making it abundant during summer, though it can be recorded all year round. Collectors have noted that this species is attracted to light in mature sites.

=== New Zealand range ===
Pseudocoremia productata is widespread across New Zealand and has been recorded across many locations. Patrick (1997) reported the species on Codfish Island. White et al. (2002) documented its presence in the Waimakariri Basin. Patrick (2004) recorded it at several sites, including Lake Ferry, Humenga Point, Cape Palliser and Te Kaukau. Patrick et al. (2011) observed the moth at Ahuriri Scenic Reserve, Onawe Peninsula and Hinewai reserve. Toft (2014) recorded P. productata at Macgregor Creek and Robinson Slip.

== Habitat ==
This moth is a common species found in shrublands and forests and may be observed resting on tree trunks, particularly on its host plant, the White Rata. The moth is attracted to late summer blossoms and found on the outskirts of densely wooded country or tree foliage of host plant.

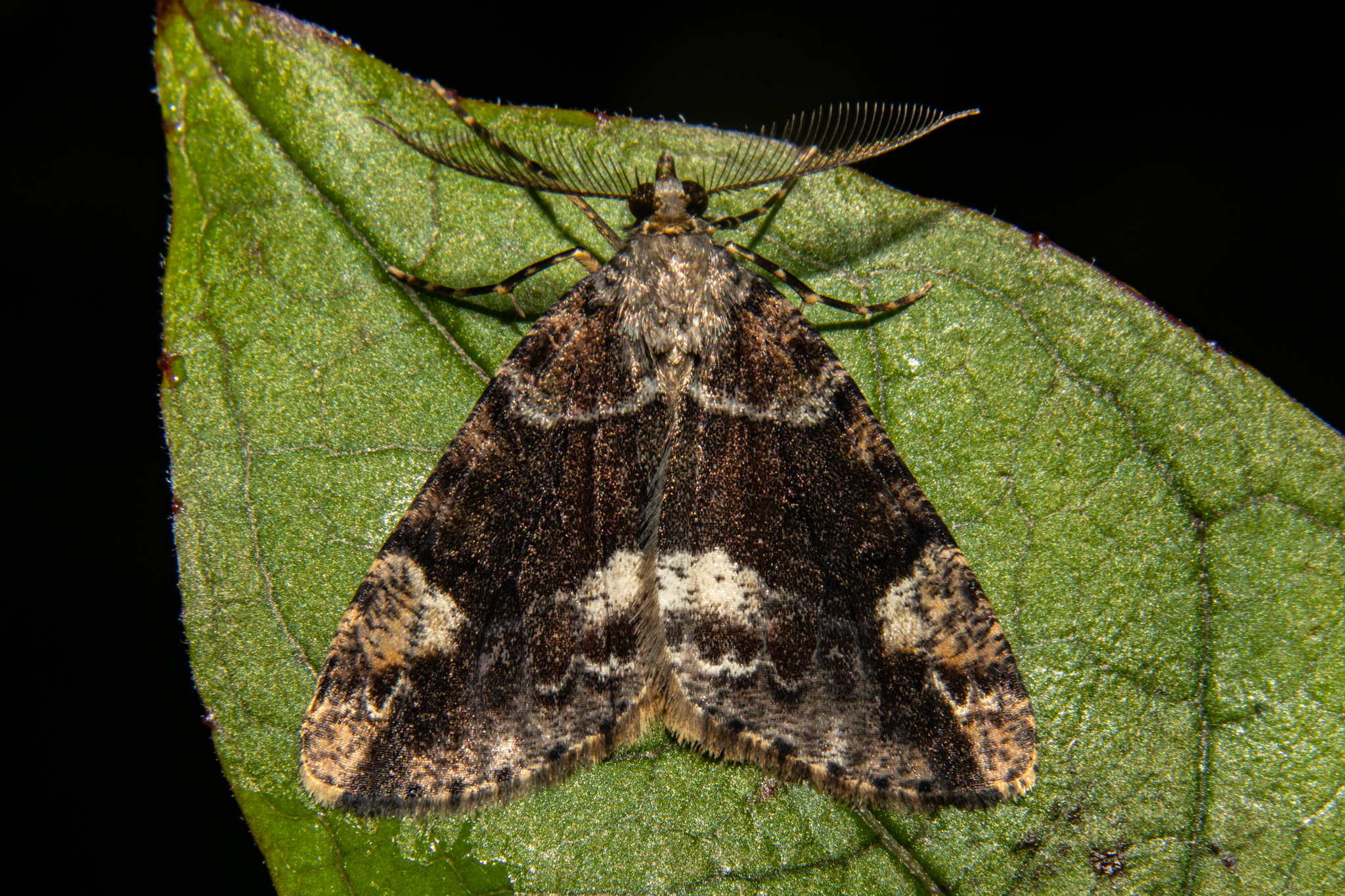

== Ecology ==
=== Life cycle/Phenology ===
The eggs of Pseudocoremia productata are laid on White Rata in irregular bundles that adhere to the surface they were deposited on, displaying a pale green colour before turning bright reddish-brown after a few days. They are characterised by their oval-globose shape in numerous rows of hexagonal facets, with the lengths of each egg reaching up to 1/4 inch (6.4 mm).

Once hatched the larvae measure up to 1 1/2 inches (38 mm) when fully grown and present ochreous colours with "sub-dorsal lines and numerous black bristles on posterior segments". Its dark reddish-brown colour presents mottles and stripes that appear white and green. The larvae pose as fragments of Rata tree during the day by staying stiff and motionless, blending seamlessly with surrounding twigs. It is nocturnal and only active at night, feeding on the foliage of various trees and allowing them to be polyphagous.

When ready to pupate, the larvae will dig small chambers two inches under the soil of their food plant and enclose themselves into a small cocoon. According to Hudson (1928), there are three generations each year, one in spring, one in summer, and one in autumn. Larvae observed in late autumn remain in its cocoon-like state over winters. In contrast, the pupal stages for the spring and summer broods are notably shorter, only lasting a few weeks.

=== Diet and foraging ===
Pseudocoremia productata is a polyphagous moth with a notable preference for its host plant, White Rata (Metrosideros seandens). This preference is evident when White Rata is in bloom, suggesting that adult moths feed on nectar and may play a role as pollinators within their ecosystem. Recently, Knox (2024) recorded three additional tree species in the moth's diet: Miro (Prumnopitys ferruginea), Southern Rata (Metrosideros umbellata), and Tutu (Coriaria spp). This moth has also been observed feeding on Plum Pine (Podocarpus) and Southern Beeches (Nothofagus) with a preference for foliage, shoots, and green vascular tissues.

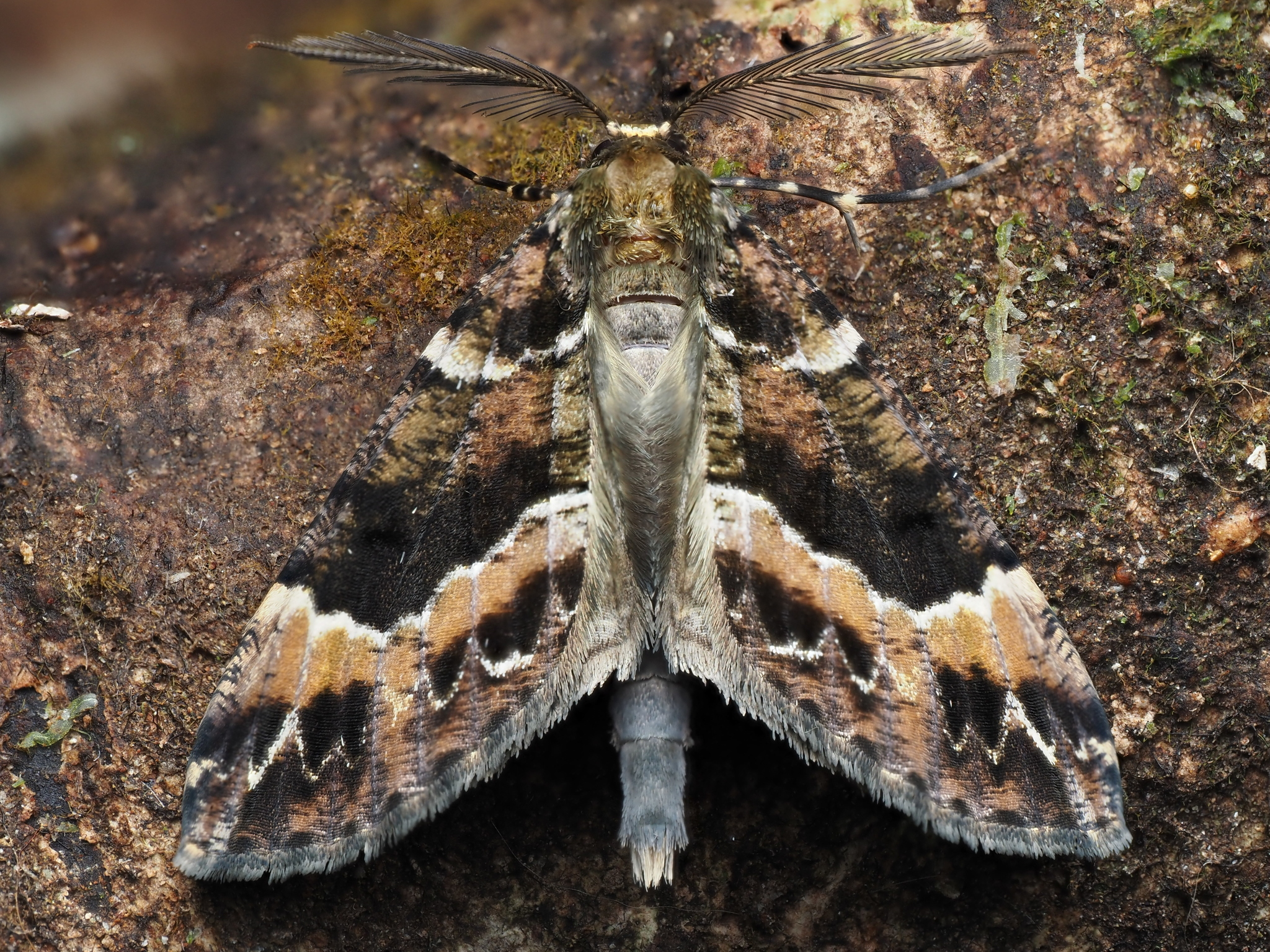

=== Predators, parasites, and diseases ===
Specific information on Pseudocoremia productata's predators, parasites, and diseases is still unknown. However, studies on closely related species within the Pseudocoremia genus may provide some relevant insights. Research on Pseudocoremia suavis, a native New Zealand moth and congener of Pseudocoremia productata, has identified several parasitoid species that regulate its populations. The dominant larval parasitoid is Aleiodes declanae, while pupal parasitoids include Aucklandella conspirata, A. pyrastis, and Sealachertus longus. In addition, Meteorus pulchricornis has been recorded in New Zealand and may parasitise various lepidopteran hosts.

Natural predators of Pseudocoremia include avian species and other insectivorous animals that feed on moths and their larvae. Insect populations are often susceptible to various pathogens, including bacterial, viral, and fungal infections which can influence their population dynamic. Specific predator-prey relationships for Pseudocoremia productata have not been documented, but it is reasonable to infer that insectivores may prey upon them.
