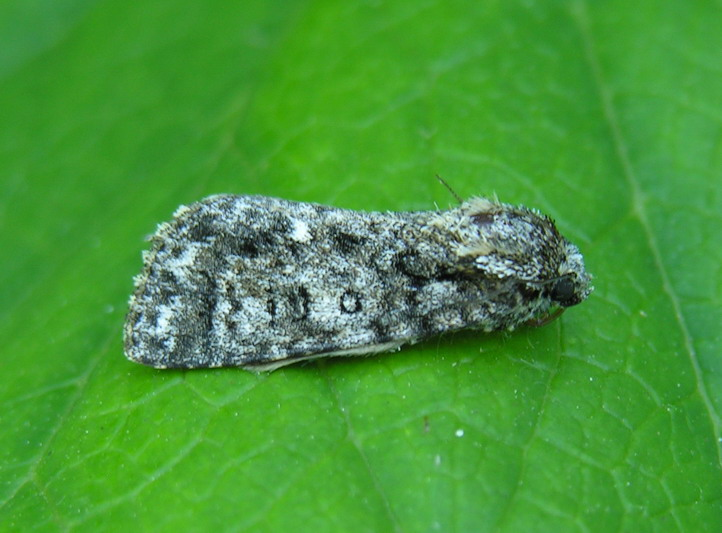

Scientific classification
- Kingdom: Animalia
- Phylum: Arthropoda
- Clade: Pancrustacea
- Class: Insecta
- Order: Lepidoptera
- Superfamily: Noctuoidea
- Family: Noctuidae
- Genus: Acronicta
- Species: A. rumicis

Binomial name
- Acronicta rumicis (Linnaeus, 1758)

= Acronicta rumicis =

Species of moth

Acronicta rumicis, the knot grass moth, is a species of moth which is part of the genus Acronicta and family Noctuidae. It was first described by Carl Linnaeus in his 1758 10th edition of Systema Naturae. It is found in the Palearctic region. A. rumicis lives and feeds on plants located in wide-open areas. At its larval stage, as a caterpillar, it causes such a large impact as a crop pest that it has received much attention and research. A. rumicis feeds on maize, strawberries and other herbaceous plants.

The moth's evolution has been affected by the industrial melanism that occurred in Europe during the late 19th and early 20th centuries, causing a dramatic increase in two aberrations (salicin and lugubris), which have darker grey wings. Today, A. rumicis is important to conservation efforts in the United Kingdom, because, like many other species, it is in decline. However, as it is part of a UK Priority Biodiversity Action Plan and receiving greater awareness and conservation, the species may become more abundant.

== Description and identification ==
A. rumicis has a wingspan of 34–44 mm. The forewings are blotched with a mixture of dark and light-grey shades, while the hindwings are dark brown. A white spot is seen midway down the trailing edge of the forewing providing a distinct marker for A. rumicis not seen in other Acronicta moths. Chinese and Japanese moths tend to be larger than their European counterparts. The Asian moths also have lower forewings that have darker shades of grey.

== Technical description and variation ==
C. rumicis L. (3i). Forewing dark grey, varied in places with whitish; lines and shades black; outer line marked by a white spot on the submedian fold; hindwings brownish fuscous Larva marbled dark and light grey: a dorsal row of red spots on black blotches, and a row of white spots on each side; a pale line below spiracles, containing orange-red tubercles; segments 5 and 12 of dorsum humped; tubercles with fascicles of fuscous and fulvous hairs— turanica Stgr., a form from Central Asia, is much paler, with the hindwings whitish. — Chinese and Japanese examples (3k) are larger than European and in all cases darker; in particular the lower half of forewing is blacker and the white spot of outer line then often obscured; possibly the scotch form figured by Curtis as salicis, a melanic form, may represent this aberration, though the larva figured as belonging thereto is unquestionably that of menyanthidis. — ab. alnoides Geest (3k) has the costal half of forewing grey, the inner half blackish, somewhat interrupted with a strong black dagger-shaped mark at base and above anal angle; superficially resembles a dark grey alni; recorded from Freiburg in Baden. — ab. euphorbiae Steph. nec. Hbn. is grey brown, with the stigmata and space between them pale; and ab. euphrasiae Steph. nec Dup. is pale yellowish grey with numerous black lines and the orbicular stigma faint or obsolete, occurring in Cornwall.

== Taxonomy and phylogenetics ==
A. rumicis is a moth of the genus Acronicta and family Noctuidae. Noctuidae has upwards of 21,000 species. Noctuids are commonly known as "owlet moths" because of their large eyes that shine in the dark and the colour of their wings which make them difficult to see. In their usual resting position, noctuids fold their wings back over their bodies; the forewings overlap one another. The closed wings form a tent-like shape. Almost all Acronicta larvae are brightly coloured with spiky brown hairs all along the dorsal side of the body. According to Thomas Algernon Chapman, the genus Acronicta can be split into three major groups: The first, characterized by a hoop-like structure of the pupa and clumped oviposition, includes: A. auricoma, A. myricae, A. menthanthidis, A. venosa, and A. rumicis. The second, characterized by terminal spines of pupa and dome-shaped ova laid apart from others, includes: A. psi, A. tridens, A. strigosa, A. alni, A. megacephala, A. leporina, A. aceris. The third group has only one species, A. ligustri.

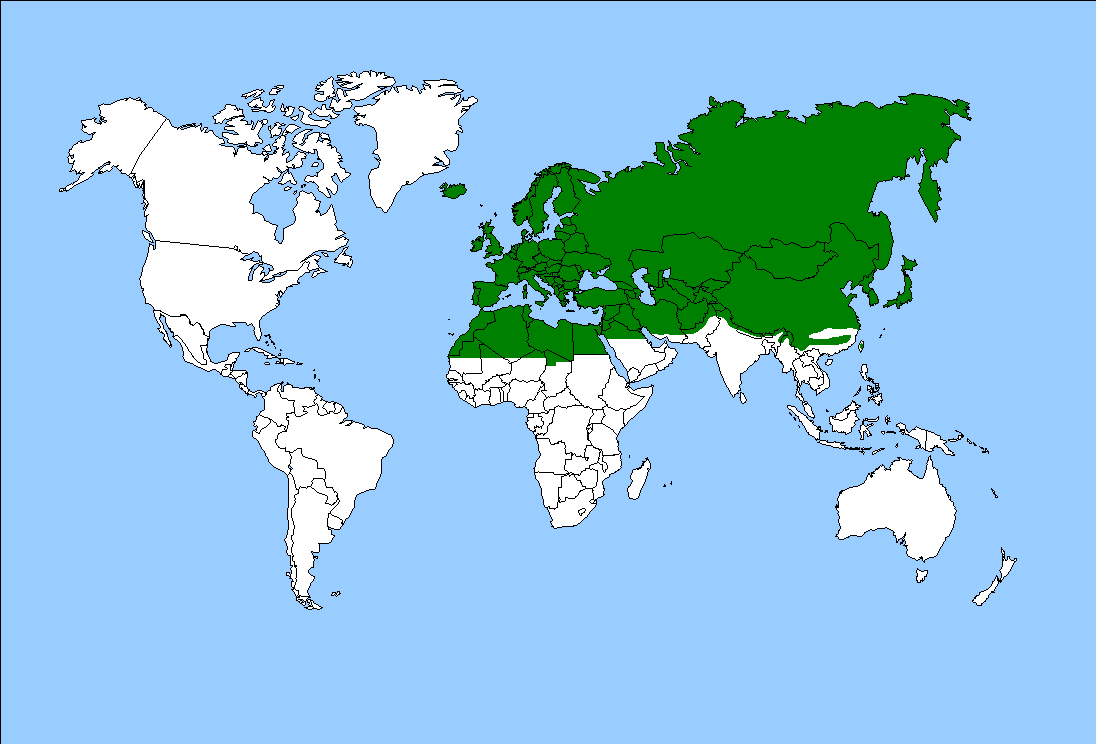
Palearctic region

== Distribution and habitat ==
A. rumicis is distributed throughout the Palearctic. It is common in northwestern China, the Korean Peninsula, and Japan, although it has also been found in other parts of Eurasia, including Russia. A. rumicis is found in almost all parts of Europe, though it is absent in some areas of north-western Scandinavia. There has been much research about the species in England and Scotland.

These moths tend to spend their lives in plants located in wide-open areas like meadows, woodland clearings, gardens, and hedgerows, generally in non-humid areas.

== Food resources ==
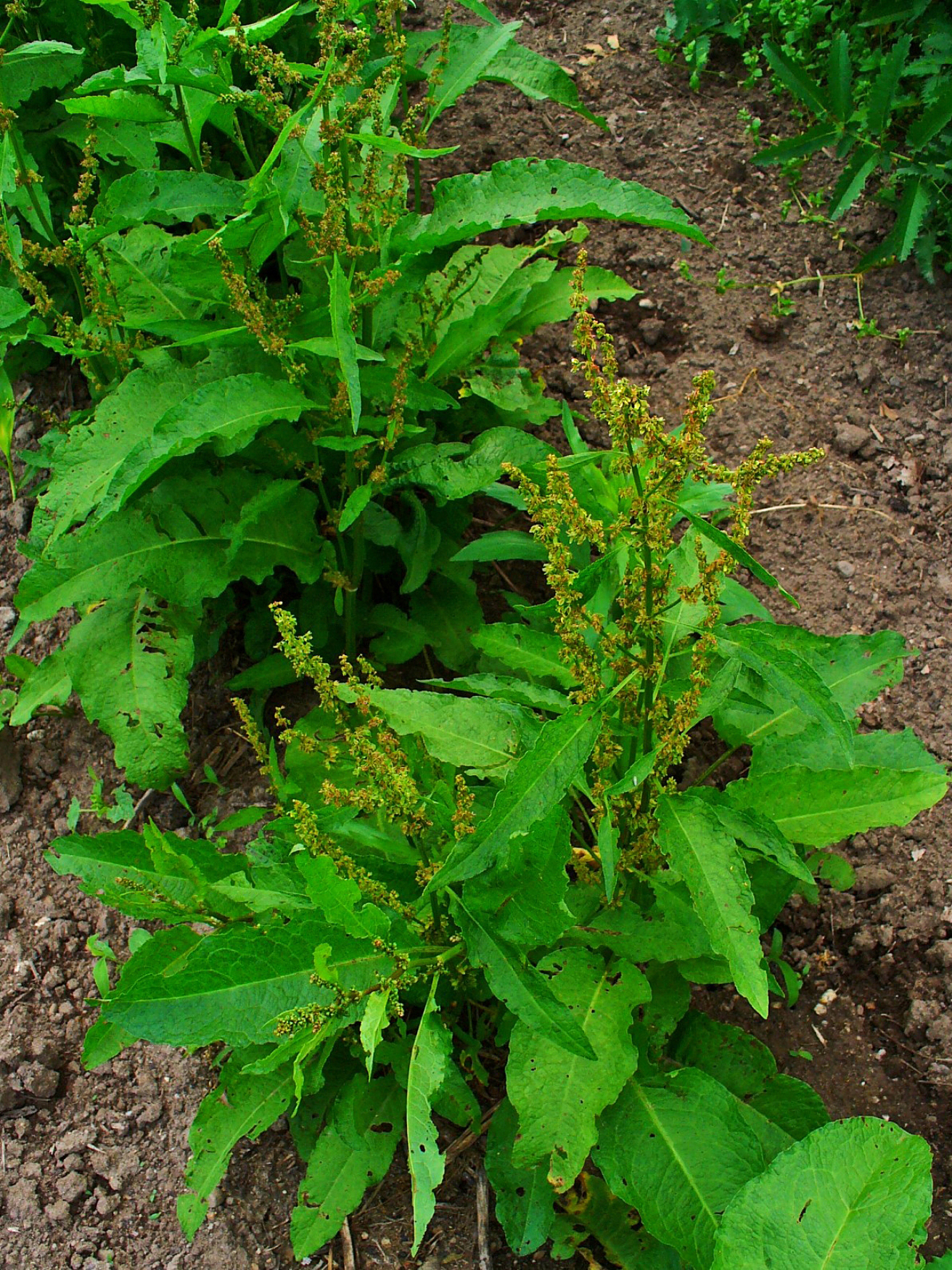
Rumex obtusifolius, or broad-leaved dock

=== Caterpillars ===
At the caterpillar stage, A. rumicis tends to feed on low-growing, herbaceous plants, including sorrel, dock, bramble, thistles, hop, and occasionally on the leaves of shrubs. In addition, A. rumicis larvae favour fruit trees like Prunus species and plants of the family Polygonaceae.

In research, one of the most commonly used host plants is Rumex obtusifolius, a herbaceous plant commonly found within A. rumicis's range.

== Parental care ==
=== Oviposition ===
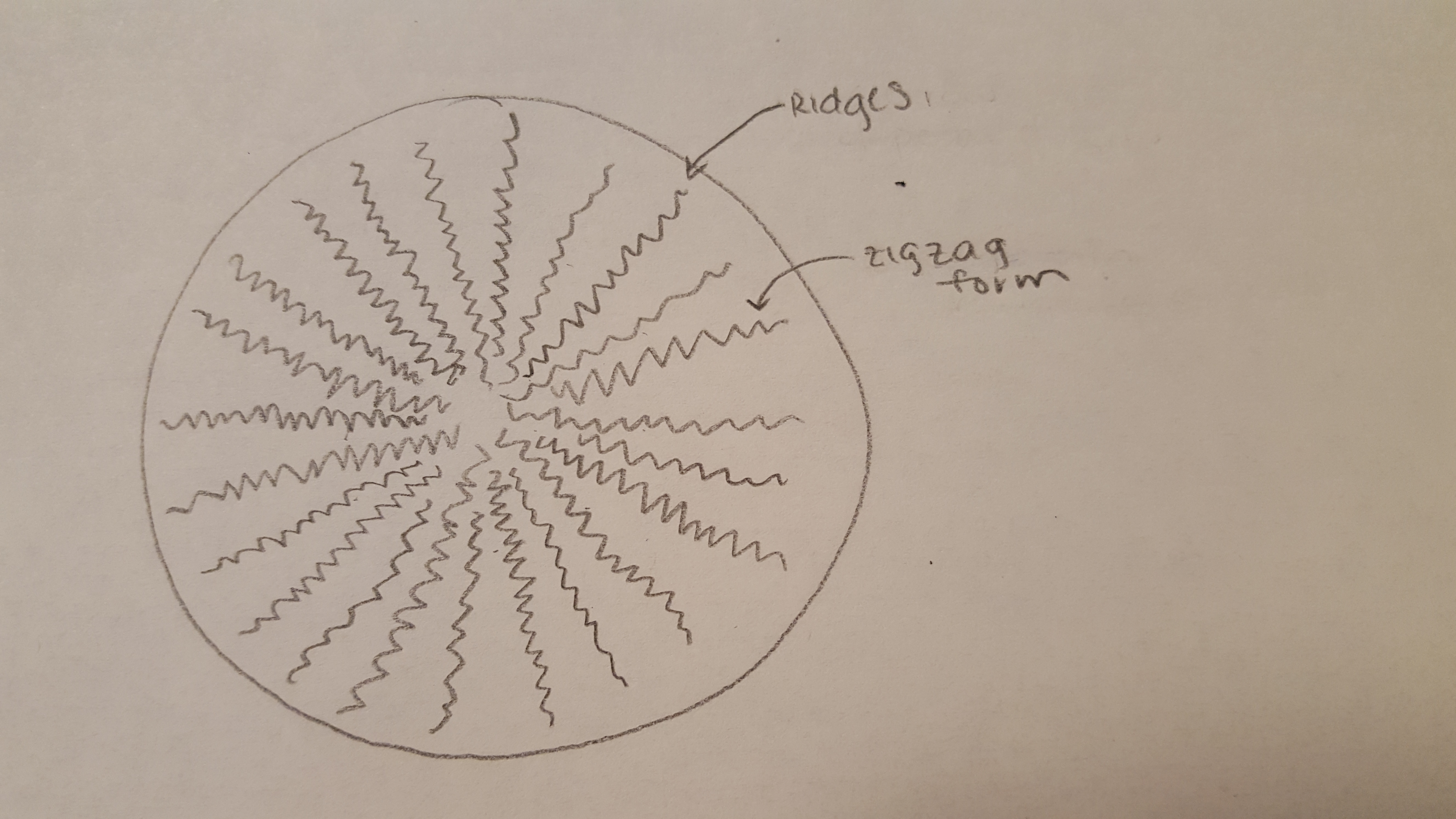
Drawing of A. rumicis egg shape

Females tend to lay eggs on leaves of host plants in large clusters. The eggs have long longitudinal ridges, which originate and spread out from the micropylar area of the egg. The longest ridges tend to be in a zigzag formation. The eggs have a flattened shape, making clustering and clumping easier.

== Life history ==
A. rumicis species generally have two broods: the first generation flies in May and June, while the second flies in August and September. However, the number of generations can differ based on location; in southern Europe, it tends to have three broods, while in the north, it has only one, most likely due to diapause. The number of broods may be determined by the duration of light and temperature ranges. The larvae tend to feed from the summer onwards until winter, during which A. rumicis spend its time in the pupae stage in cocoons.

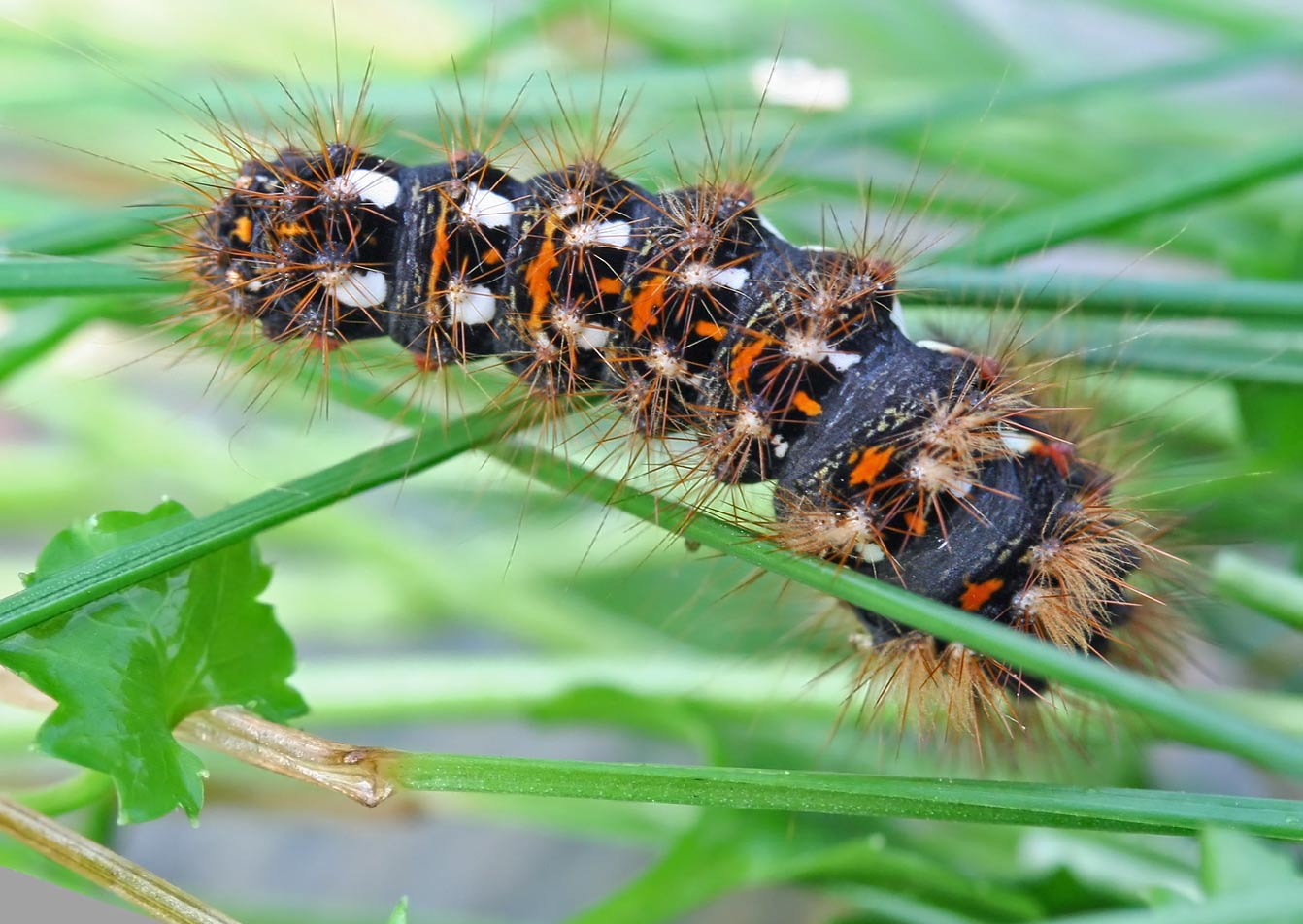
Caterpillar

=== Egg ===
Eggs are laid in clusters, in almost regular, overlapping rows on host plants. The egg stage lasts about 5 to 10 days. The eggs have a round flattened shape like a sand dollar and has a micropylar area that has 20 long ridges that radiate from the center, almost like a child's drawing of a sun and its rays. The flattened structure allows for stability while resting on the host plant.

=== Caterpillar ===
When larvae hatch, they tend to nibble out the round opening of the egg. Usually, A. rumicis larvae are ready to pupate after 30 days. They tend to be about 40 mm long, having dark brown bodies, with white spots along both sides of the body and red spots along the centre of the back. Body hairs grow in tufts, arranged in rows: two rows along each side of the body and one row along the centre of the back.

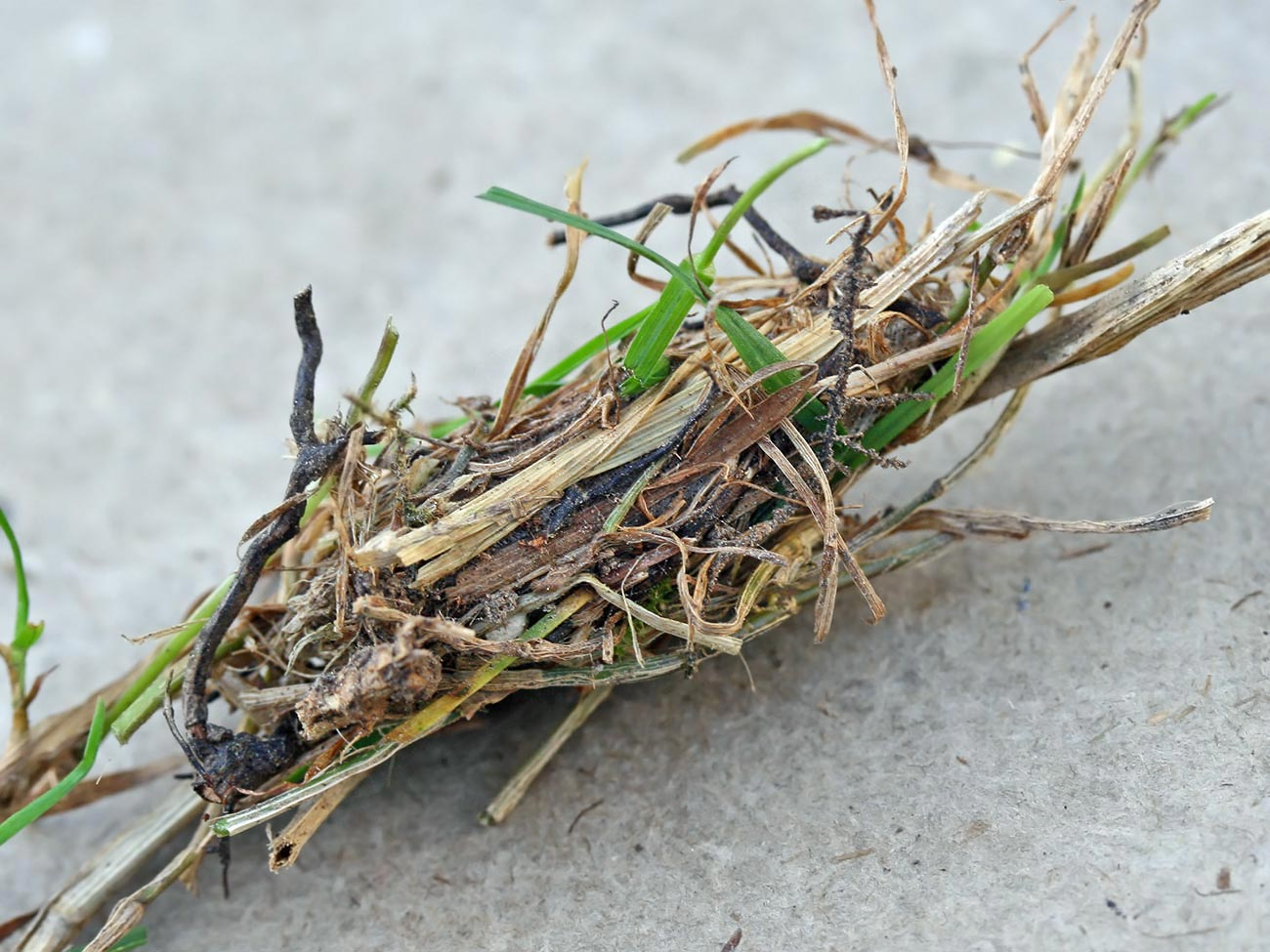
Cocoon

=== Pupa ===
Once the winter months near, fully grown caterpillars pupate in cocoons on leaves or leaf litter. The cocoon has tough white silk with one simple layer of grass, twigs, or leaves for better concealment from predators.

=== Adult ===
Adult moths tend to emerge in June but can also appear in earlier months if the weather is consistently warm.

== Enemies ==
=== Predators ===
Although the general cause of trouble in the life of A. rumicis is parasitism via parasitoids, another group of predators includes small birds. These birds, like the great spotted woodpecker, tend to breed and nest in agricultural regions. In one study from Slovenia, the birds were nested in a hop field. Hop is a popular food resource for A. rumicis, while caterpillars are the primary food source for these birds.

=== Parasites ===
Parasitism in A. rumicis generally occurs in the months of May and October. Rates are lower in the months of June and July for reasons yet unknown. Most parasitoids affecting A. rumicis are parasitic wasps in the Braconidae and Ichneumonidae families, as well as parasitic flies.

One of the most common parasitoids of A. rumicis is Glyptapanteles liparidis, a larval parasitoid that is highly distributed throughout Eurasia. G. liparidis oviposits on the surface of the moth larvae; once hatched, the wasp larvae feed on the A. rumicis larvae and eventually cause death.

Based on one study in South Korea, G. liparidis affects A. rumicis in its first, second, third, and fourth instar. The same study also discovered that the second-instar larvae were apparently the best food source for this parasitoid, as the second-instar larvae had the highest mortality rate in comparison to the other three larval stages. As the G. liparidis continuously grows and utilizes the resources produced internally by A. rumicis larvae, the feeding habits of these larvae change as well. On average, parasitized larvae consume more plant material than those not parasitized; the second instar larvae tend to consume the most food in comparison to the first, third, and fourth instars, supporting the idea that most G. liparidis feed most efficiently on the second instar larvae of A. rumicis.

== Genetics of colour patterns ==
=== Pigmentation and structural colouration ===
Industrial melanism exists within the species, meaning the moths evolved during the industrial period in England when dark soot was deposited into the environment. The aberration salicis Curtis, which is commonly found throughout the moth's distribution range, has darker grey-blotched sections on wings and retains the A. rumicis identifying marker, the white spot on its forewings. Aberration salicis is commonly found distributed in England, Wales, and Ireland.

The aberration lugubris Schultz is almost completely black, lacking the mixed-grey mottling on the wings, but still retains the prominent white spot marker on its forewings. Aberration lugubris can be found mainly in England. According to B.K. West, since the late 1990s, melanism in A. rumicis has become less and less prevalent; in 1995, about 20% of A. rumicis were observed to be melanic, but over the course of five years the percentage decreased to 6.1%. By 2004, only 2.8% of population were melanic. With the industrial period in the past and resting surfaces less darkened by soot, it is reasonable to see that evolutionarily, the melanic variations are no longer as favourable.

== Physiology ==
=== Diapause ===
In A. rumicis, duration of light and temperature are two major factors causing diapause, the slowing or stopping of development in an insect when environmental conditions are not optimal. In one study, the onset of diapause was observed after varying photoperiods, while constantly rearing A. rumicis larvae at 27-28 °C. When A. rumicis were exposed to light on a short day, or 6–15 hours in the experiment, during the larval feeding period, almost all individuals underwent diapause after reaching pupal stage. As the daily photoperiods extended past 17 hours, the incidence of diapause began to drop, not causing any change to the development of the pupae in the cocoon.

The ability of A. rumicis to undergo diapause allows for the completion of two generations while its host plants are available. The first generation develops under longer photoperiods, therefore the pupae are physiologically active, while the second generation grow under shorter photoperiods, meaning it is more beneficial for pupae to form diapause as they overwinter through the cold.

== Interactions with humans ==
=== Pests of crop plants ===
A. rumicis is a minor pest of various of fruit plants, mostly strawberries. However, they can also cause damage to blackberry, raspberry, loganberry, apple, pear, and cherry. Usually the larvae cause defoliation as they feed on the newly grown leaves. A. rumicis also attacks beans, ground nuts, wheat, maize, brassicas, and others.

According to a study in Poland, A. rumicis has also taken over maize populations, feeding until the leaves of the corn plants are no longer fresh and new because of the shift into harvesting season. During the spring and summer, the larvae of these moths damages both the leaves and silks of the cobs, occasionally eating soft kernels as well. When the second brood came in the fall, they only ate the leaves. This study in Poland further supports that A. rumicis larva prefer to eat fresh and newly grown leaves.

== Conservation ==
Overall, the population of A. rumicis is in a sharp decline. Focusing on the moths in the United Kingdom, current research suggests that moths are in danger due to habitat loss, poor habitat management, global warming, and environmental deterioration from pesticides and pollution. Since 1969, the population of A. rumicis has declined by nearly 75%. Recently, A. rumicis was assigned as a Priority Biodiversity Action Plan (BAP) species, meaning the moth was identified as most threatened and will immediately be part of conservation efforts.

Researchers are realizing that the conservation of woodland areas is a high priority, in order to sustain as many populations of BAP species as possible; they also found a positive correlation between the species richness of herbaceous plants and the population density of moths.

=== Habitat loss and migration issues ===
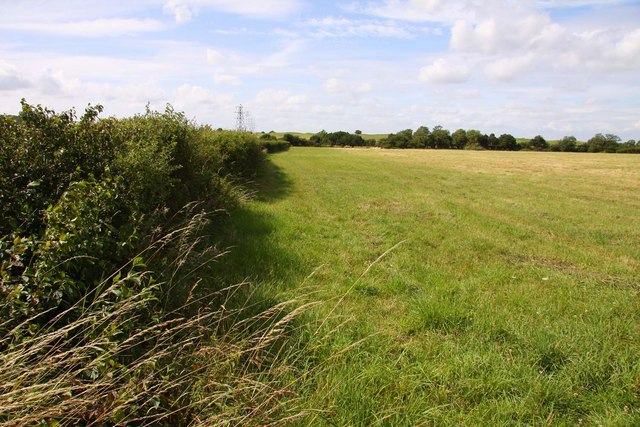
hedgerows

According to Emma Coulthard, hedgerows in close proximity to crop plants and farmlands are highly important to the survival of moths like A. rumicis. Habitats like hedgerows tend to provide food resources, shelter, and a place for females to lay eggs. In addition, recent studies have shown that hedgerows may act as guides for moths when flying from one location to another. As moths are nocturnal, it is highly unlikely that they use visual aids as guides, but rather are following olfactory markers.

However, recently, hedgerows have been removed to increase agricultural efficiency. Removing key habitats like hedgerows not only limits the basic necessities of survival (i.e. food, shelter), but also prevents the moth from navigating properly; eventually, the moth would lose its trail and then potentially die. Even the smallest gaps between two bunches of hedgerows can cause a moth to go astray; one metre of no hedgerow can make an impact. Therefore, it is crucial for agriculturalists to figure out a way to pursue their plans while conserving the homes of moths like A. rumicis.
