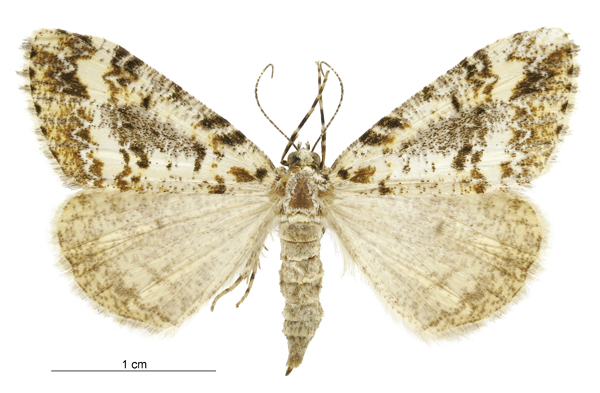
- Female
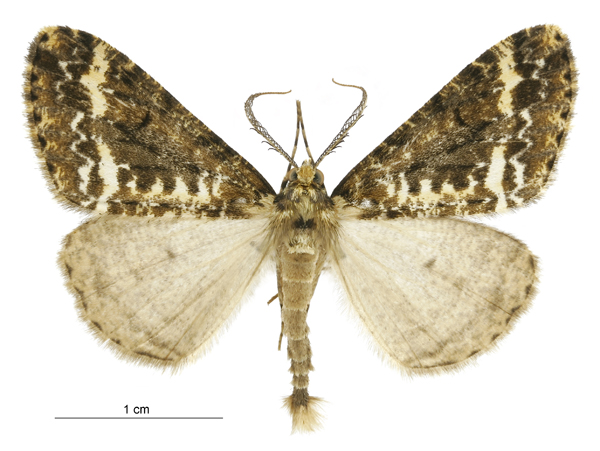
- Male

Scientific classification
- Kingdom: Animalia
- Phylum: Arthropoda
- Clade: Pancrustacea
- Class: Insecta
- Order: Lepidoptera
- Family: Geometridae
- Genus: Pseudocoremia
- Species: P. leucelaea

Binomial name
- Pseudocoremia leucelaea (Meyrick, 1909)

Synonyms
- Selidosema productata (Walker, 1862); Selidosema leucelaea Meyrick, 1909

= Pseudocoremia leucelaea =

Species of moth native to New Zealand

Pseudocoremia leucelaea, also known as the forest looper, conifer flash or the white-marked brown, is a species of moth in the family Geometridae. The species was first described by Edward Meyrick in 1909. It only occurs in New Zealand, where it is found in the North, South and Stewart Islands. This species inhabits both native and non-native conifer forests. The larvae feed on the leaves of a variety of conifers. Larvae are nocturnal; during the day they cling to twigs with their prolegs holding their bodies rigidly extended. This posture, as well as the colouration of the larva, helps it avoid detection. The larvae have been shown to be parasitised by a parasitic wasp in the genus Glyptapanteles. This species pupates in soil or leaf litter underneath host plants. Adults are variable in appearance and are on the wing throughout the year. They are nocturnal and are attracted to light. A longitudinal study indicated this moth suffered a population decline in the study area in Lower Hutt the mid-1980s, from which the population did not recover. It has been hypothesised that this decline was caused by the arrival of the wasp species Vespula vulgaris in New Zealand.

== Taxonomy ==
This species was first described by Edward Meyrick in 1909 and originally named Selidosema leucelaea. In 1898 George Hudson illustrated the species in his book New Zealand moths and butterflies (Macro-lepidoptera) under the name Selidosema productata. In 1928 and again in 1950 Hudson discussed and illustrated the species under the name S. leucelaea. John S. Dugdale, in 1961, used the name S. leucelaea when studying the external morphology of the larvae of this species. In 1988 Dugdale placed this species in the genus Pseudocoremia. The lectotype, collected by Alfred Philpott in Invercargill, is held at the Natural History Museum, London.

== Description ==
=== Egg ===
Hudson described the egg of this species as follows:

The egg is oval, slightly smaller at one end, with the surface strongly honey-combed; its length is about 1/32 inch (0.8 mm), and its colour is pale green, becoming pale pink about a week after being laid.

=== Larva ===
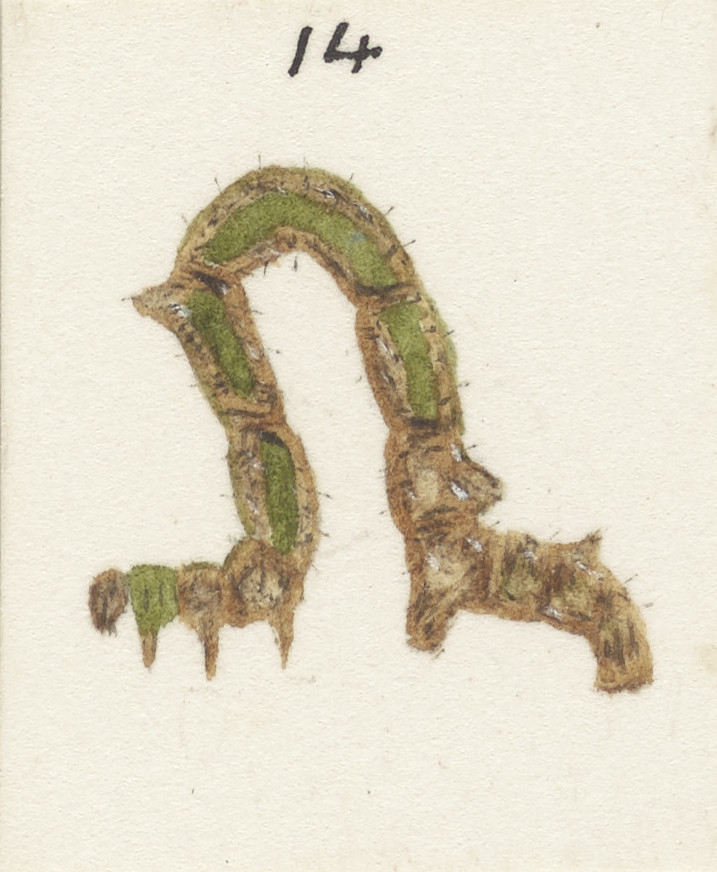
Illustration of larva.

Hudson also described the larva as follows:

The young larva, when first hatched, is about 1/8 inch (3.2 mm) long, very slender, with the head ochreous-brown and the body yellowish-green; there are two broad reddish-brown lateral lines, which become confluent on the last two segments, and a few short black bristles. After the second moult the larva is pale brown, with obscure darker brown dorsal and sub-dorsal lines. The full-grown larva is about 1 1/4 inches (31.8 mm) in length; the head is very small, dark brown, with shining black markings; the body is rather slender, stouter posteriorly, with a pair of humps on the back of segments 6, 9 and 12; its general colour is yellowish-brown with numerous fine irregular dark brown wavy markings; the skin of the larva is somewhat wrinkled and roughened; there is a series of large elongate-oval dull green spots on the back of segments 2 to 8 inclusive, and a series of similar markings on the sides of segments 5 to 8 inclusive; the second segment is almost entirely green, and there are obscure greenish patches on the sides of segments 11 and 12; a few isolated black bristles are scattered over the larva.

Hudson pointed out that the larvae are variable in colour with some being wholly brown while others have large green markings. The colouration of the larvae assists in camouflaging it against the twigs of its host plants. The larvae of the sister species P. productata are also variable and it is difficult to distinguish between the two species at this stage of life.

=== Adults ===
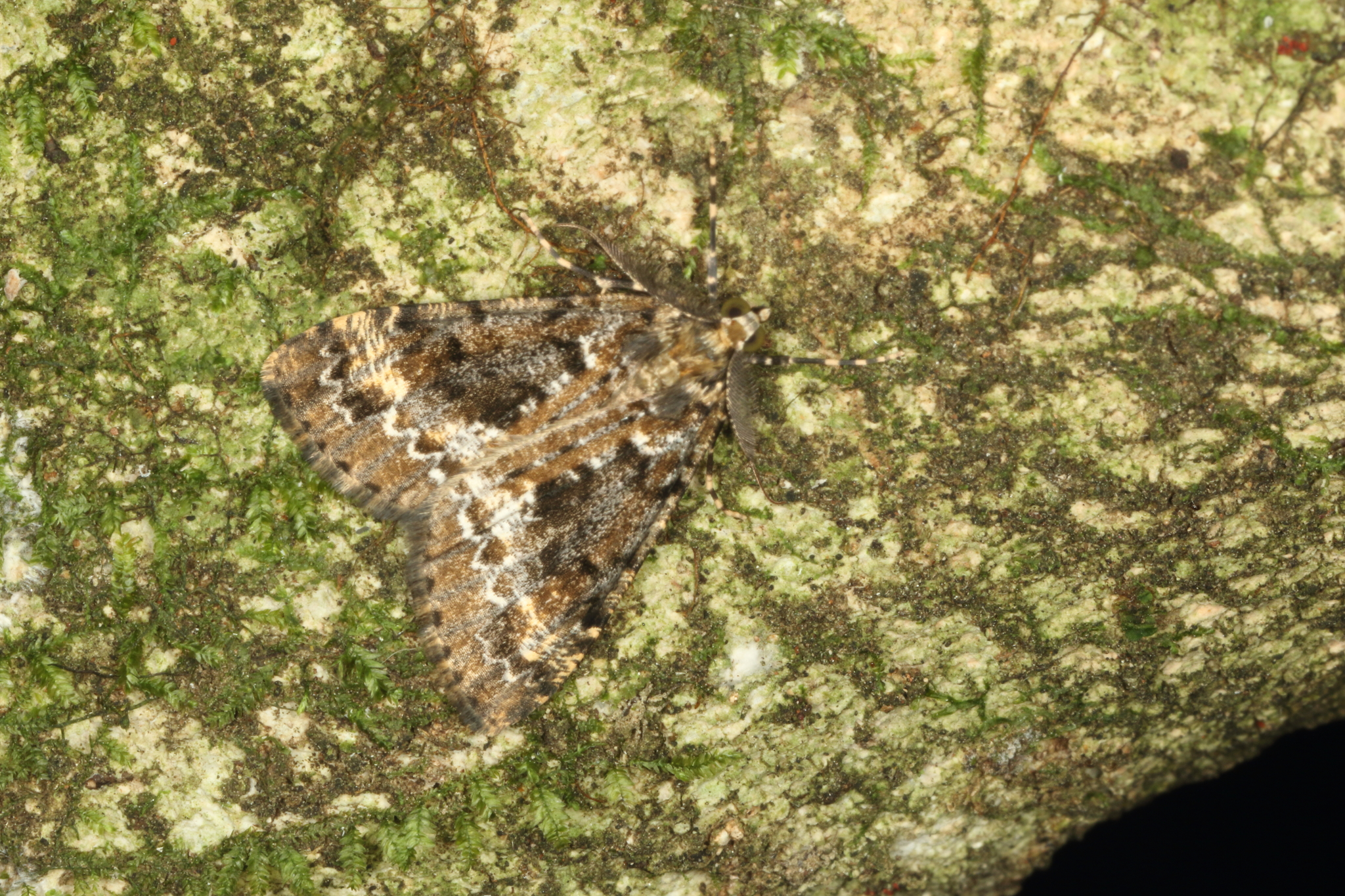
Adult at rest on a tree trunk.

The adults have a wingspan of 30 millimetres (1.2 in) to 34 millimetres (1.3 in). The adults are very variable in appearance. The colours of the adult moth are also sexually dimorphic. While both sexes are mottled, the female has a primary buff undertone, with earthy coppery colours being present, whereas the male has a more earthy colouring with mottling being present as well as distinct forewing banding, which, although present in the female, is less distinct. The body shape and antennae also differ between the male and female, with males having a slender, conical body shape, bushy, feathery antennae, and a hair-pencil at the bottom of their abdomens. The female has more thread-like antennae and has a fatter abdomen lacking the cone shape seen in the male.

Philpott stated that adults could be confused with P. productata, however Meyrick was of the opinion that the two species could be easily distinguished by the different form of median band on the forewings. P. productata has a median band where the posterior margin is obtusely angulated above the middle of the forewing. Meyrick also pointed out that P. leucelaea is similar in appearance to P. melinata, from which it differs as P. leucelaea has much longer antennal pectinations, less rounded termen of forewings, and a distinct and unusually straight white posterior band across the forewing.

Hudson stated that the mottled colouring of the forewings camouflages the insect well when resting on lichen-covered tree trunks. Almost completely black male and female specimens have been observed.

== Gallery showing variations in adult moth appearance ==
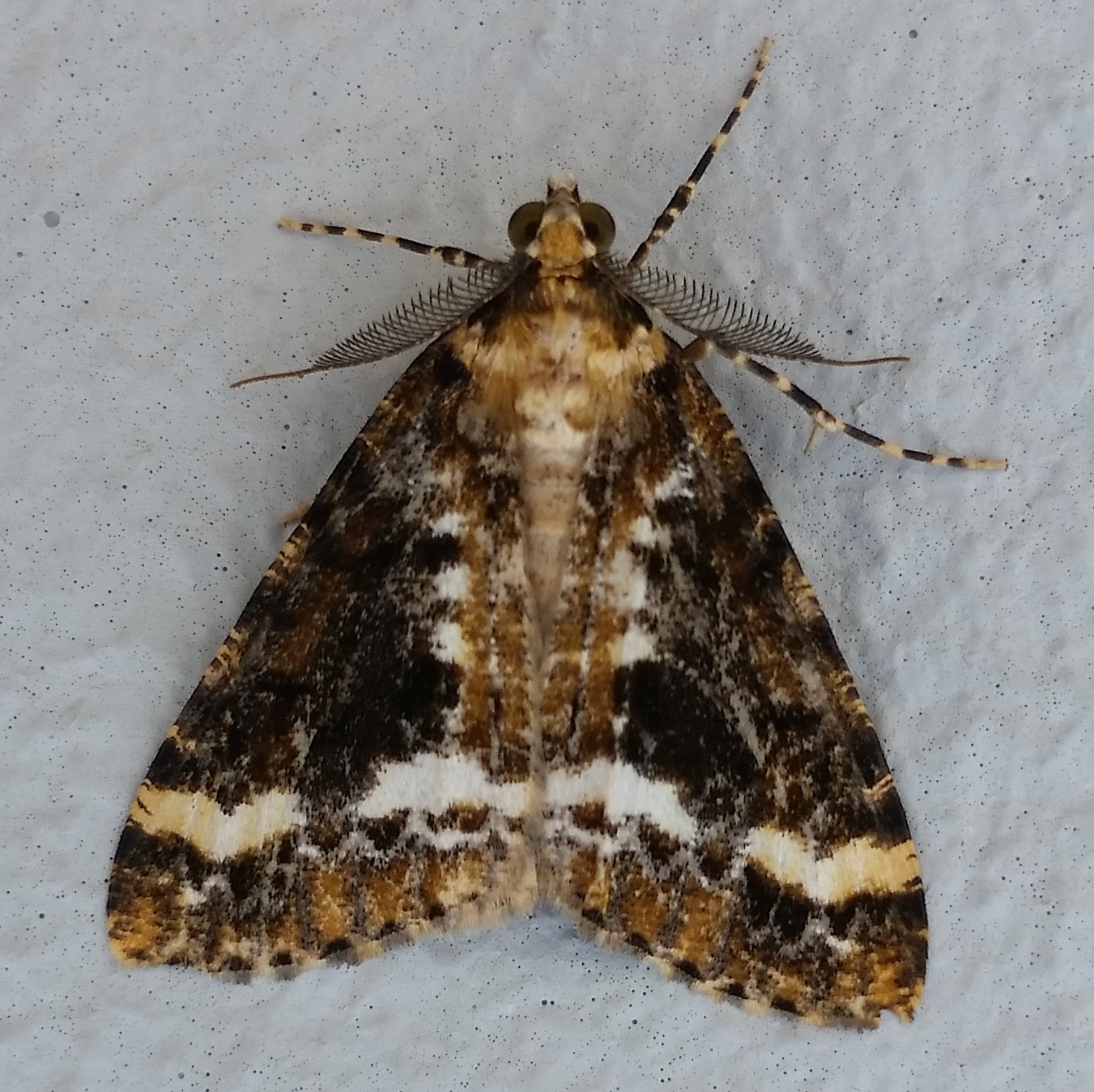

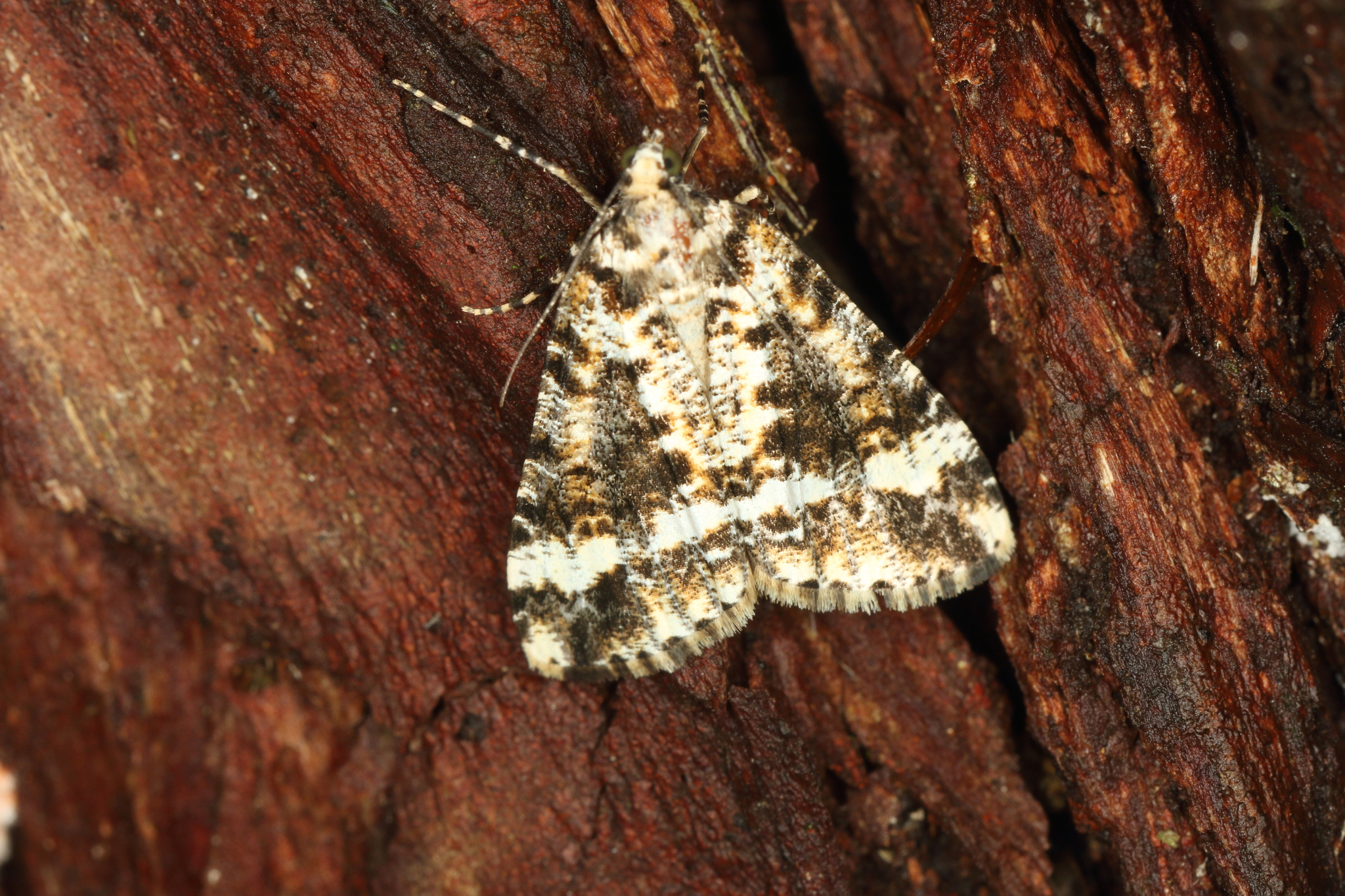

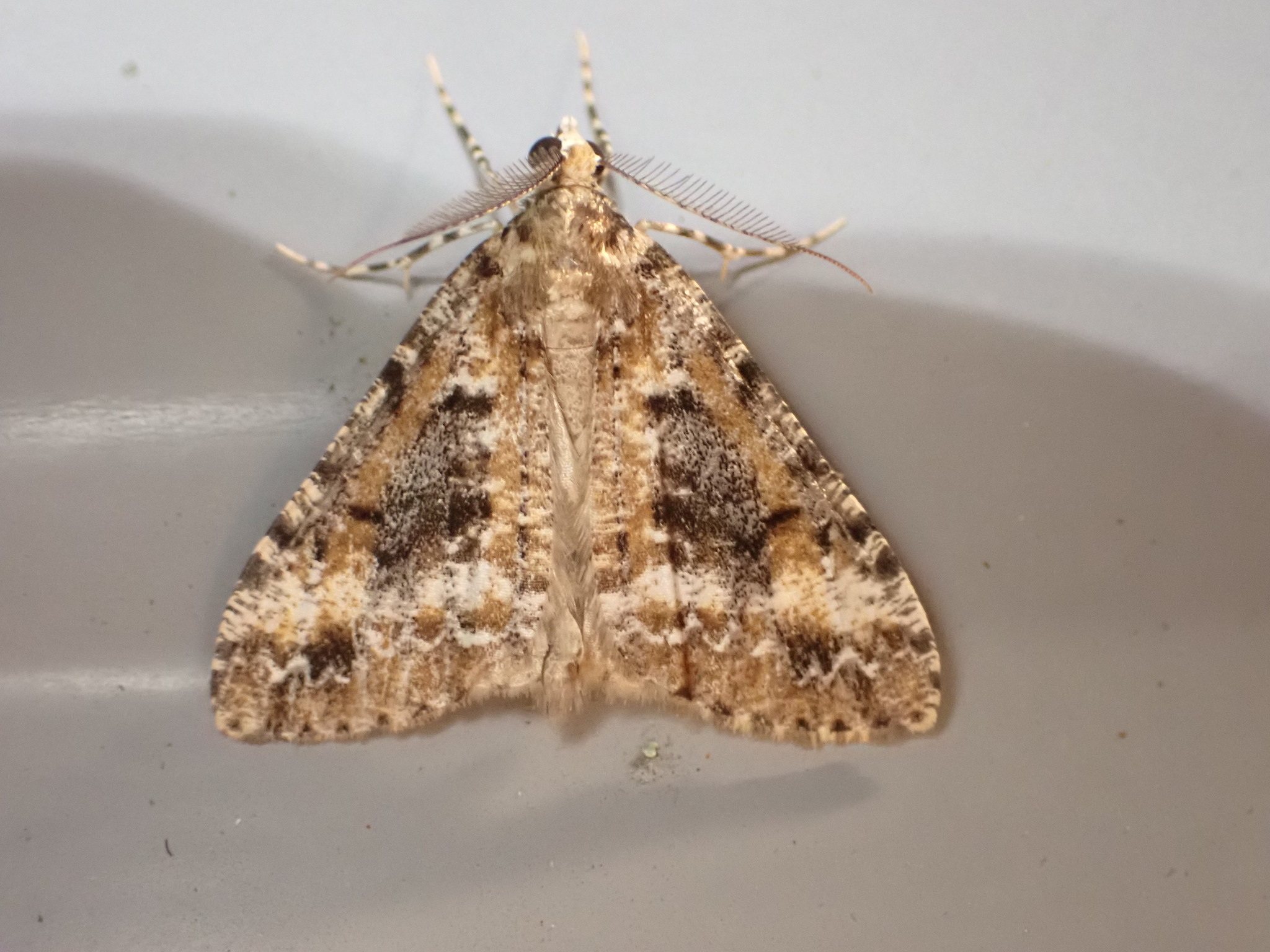

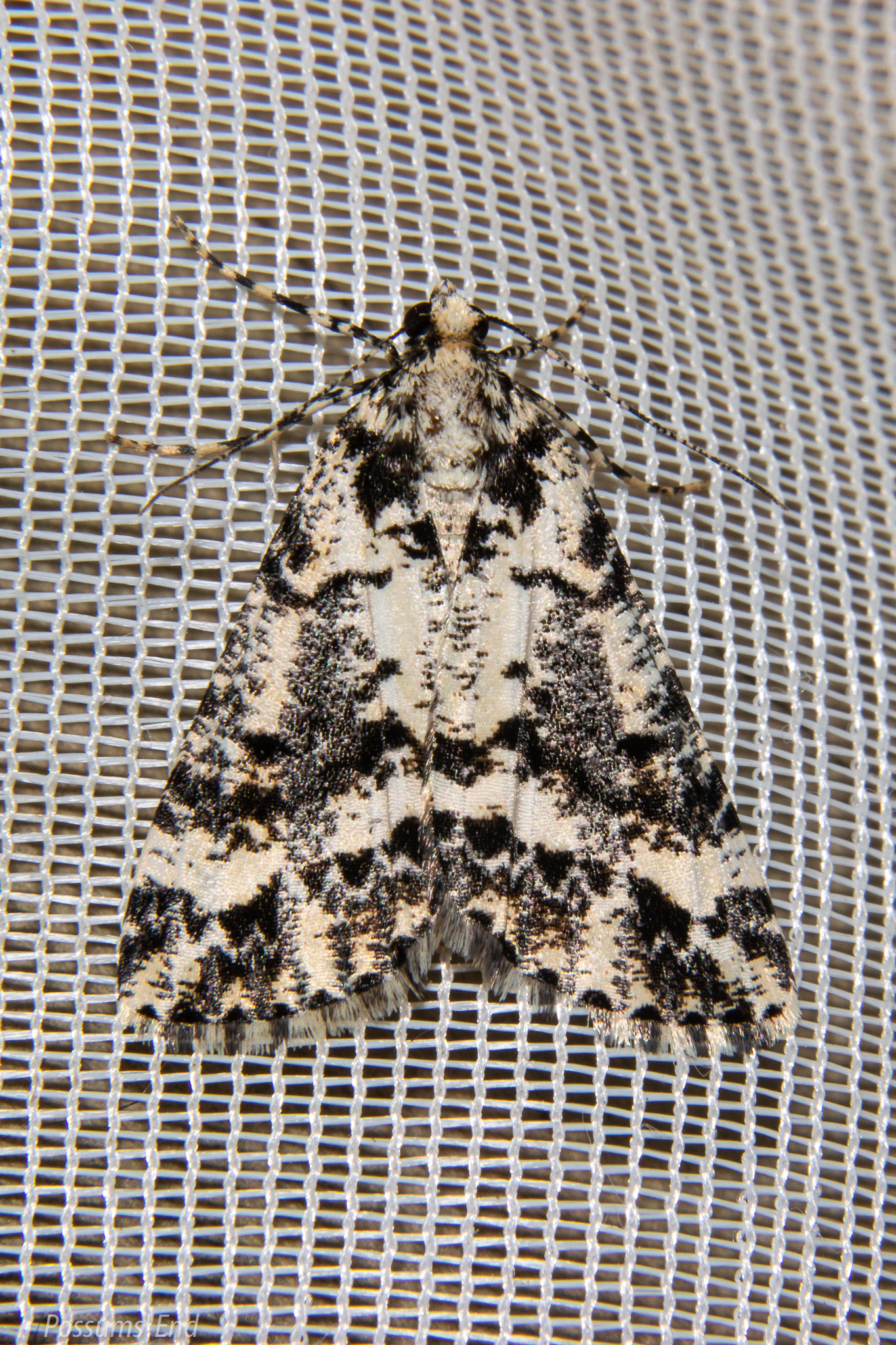

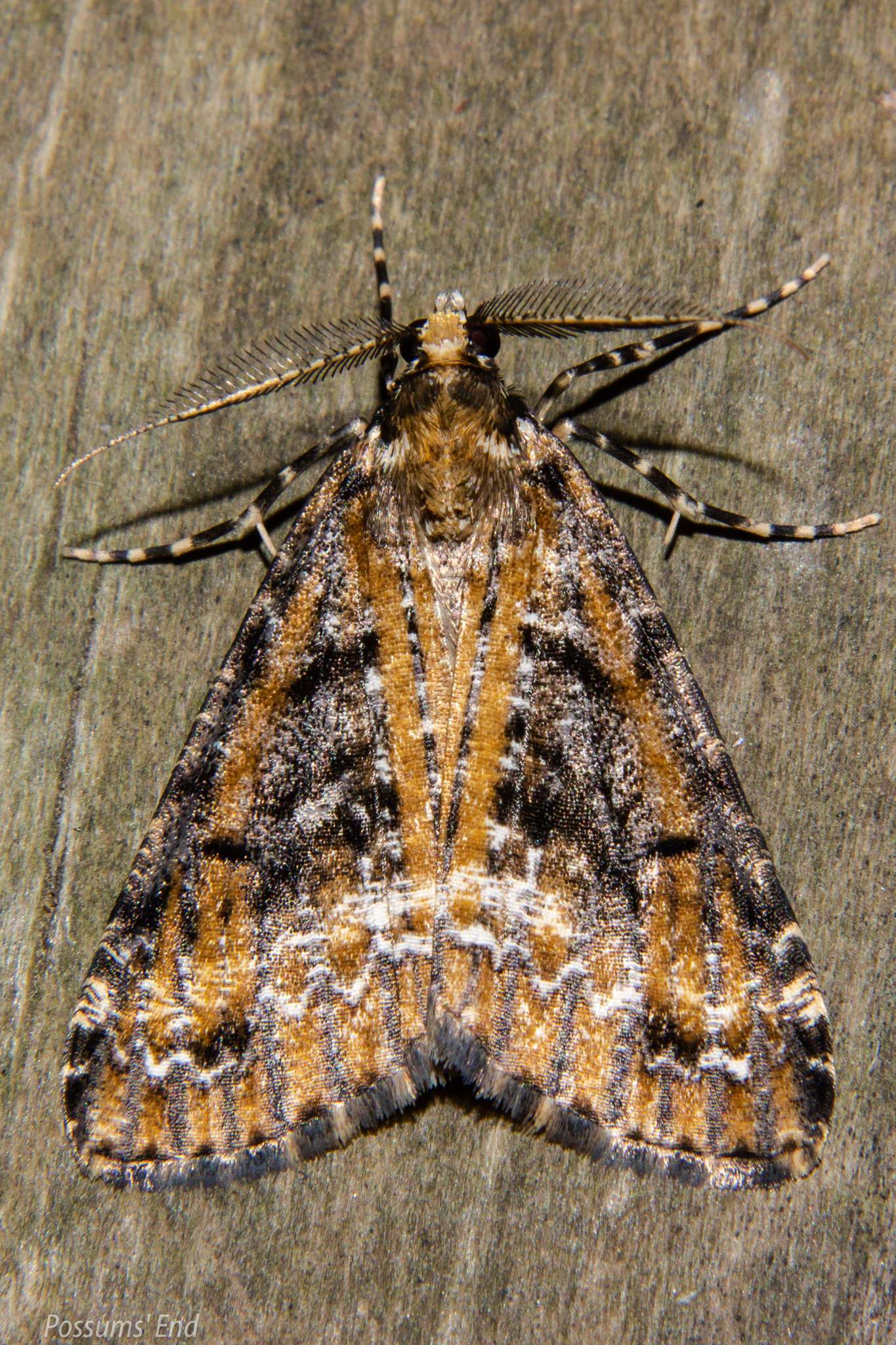

== Distribution ==
This species is endemic to New Zealand and found throughout the country.

== Habitat and hosts ==
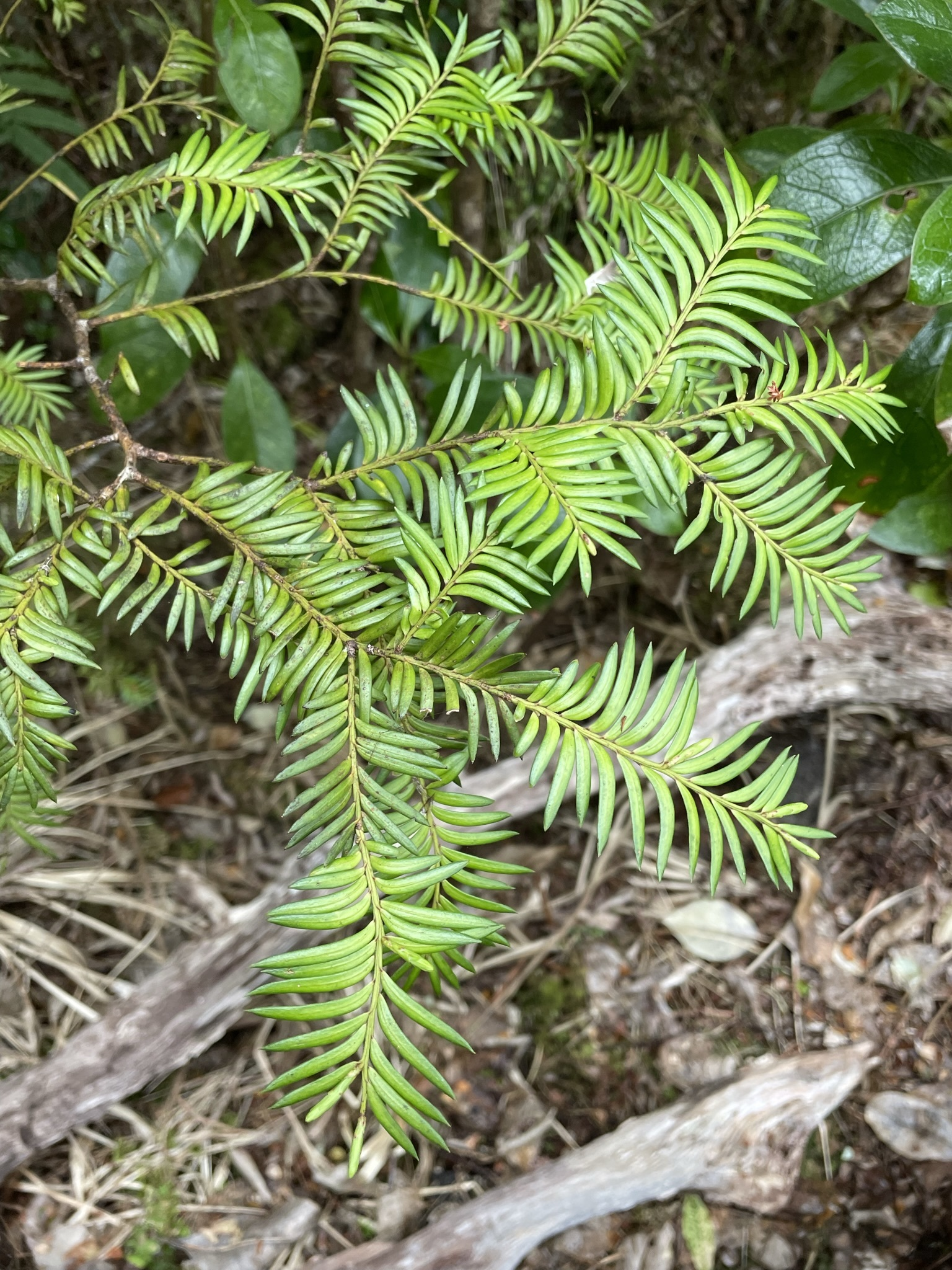
Larval host Pectinopitys ferruginea.

P. leucelaea inhabits forests where its host plants, conifer trees, are common. It can be found up to considerable elevations. The larvae feed on the leaves of native conifers including Podocarpus totara, Agathis australis, Phyllocladus alpinus, Phyllocladus trichomanoides and Pectinopitys ferruginea, as well as pine trees.

== Life cycle and behaviour ==
Adults are active throughout the year with the moth being commonly observed between November and May. It has been hypothesised that there are two distinct generations per year.

The life cycle starts with an egg laid on the foliage of the host conifers from which a larva hatches and then feeds until pupation. It takes about a fortnight to three weeks for the eggs to hatch. The larvae are active at night but during the day they cling to twigs with their prolegs holding their bodies rigidly extended. This posture, as well as the colouration of the larvae, helps them avoid detection. The larvae pupates on the earth or in leaf litter beneath its host plant. Adults emerge commonly between October and April, although they can be seen year-round.

Adults are nocturnal and are attracted to light. They have been collected via a mercury vapour light trap. Adults have been observed visiting flowering plants including Pittosporum pimeleoides and Veronica salicifolia.

== Parasites and predators ==
The larvae of P. leucelaea have been shown to be parasitised by species in the parasitic wasp genus Glyptapanteles.

A longitudinal study in Lower Hutt from 1974 to 2016 indicated the population of this moth declined in the study area in the mid-1980s and did not recover. It has been hypothesised that the arrival of Vespula vulgaris in New Zealand might be the cause of the population decline.

== Interactions with humans ==
This species has a reputation as a predictor of rain as the adult moth is said to be seen flying around artificial lights prior to rainfall.
