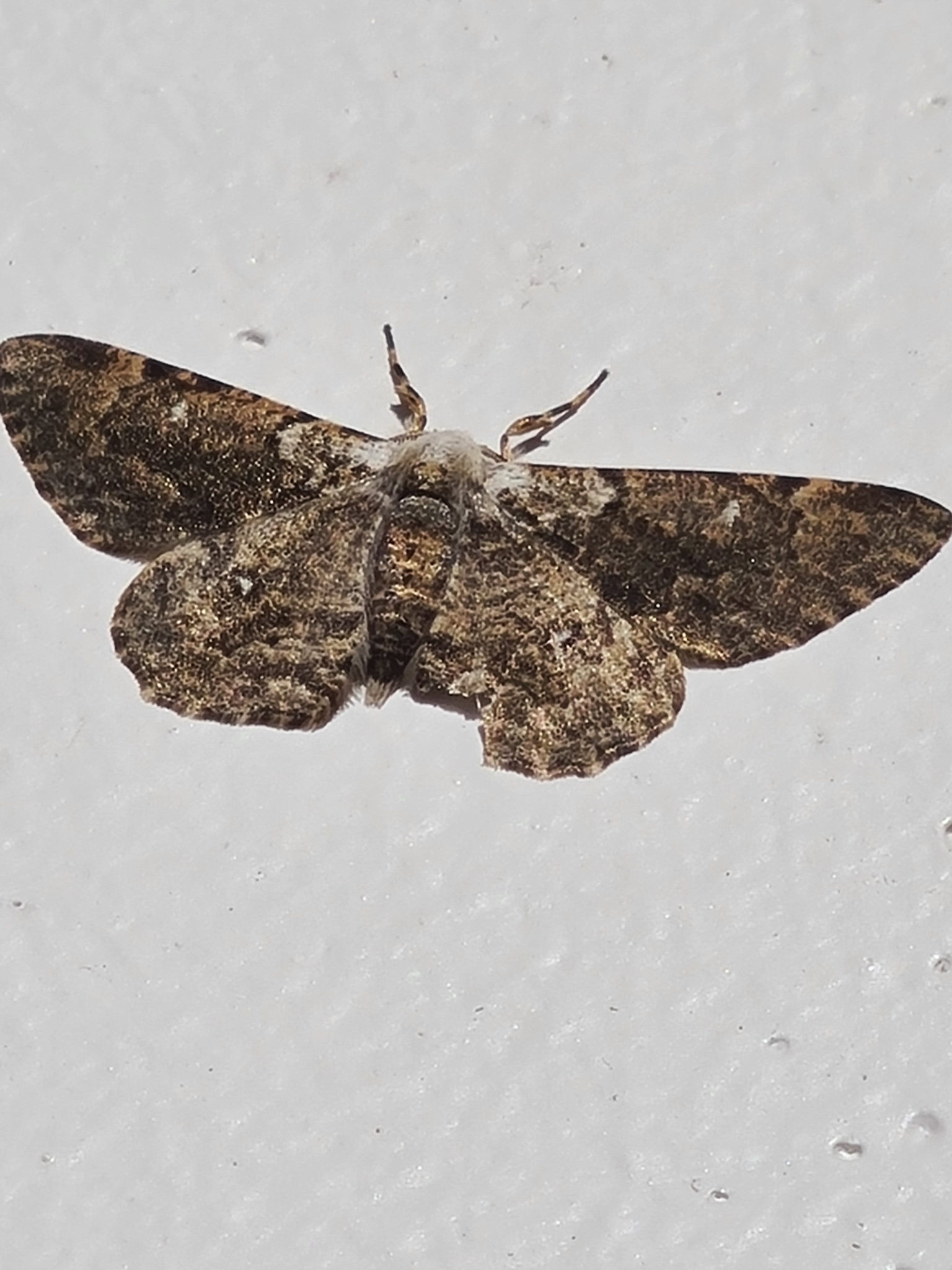

Scientific classification
- Domain: Eukaryota
- Kingdom: Animalia
- Phylum: Arthropoda
- Class: Insecta
- Order: Lepidoptera
- Family: Geometridae
- Tribe: Nacophorini
- Genus: Thyrinteina
- Species: T. arnobia

Binomial name
- Thyrinteina arnobia (Stoll in Cramer, 1782)

= Thyrinteina arnobia =

Species of moth

Thyrinteina arnobia is a species of geometrid moth in the family Geometridae. It is found in Central America, North America, and South America.

The MONA or Hodges number for Thyrinteina arnobia is 6772.

== Subspecies ==
These five subspecies belong to the species Thyrinteina arnobia:

- Thyrinteina arnobia arnobia (Stoll, 1782)
- Thyrinteina arnobia phala Rindge, 1961
- Thyrinteina arnobia picta Rindge, 1969
- Thyrinteina arnobia quadricostaria Herrich-Schäffer, 1870
- Thyrinteina arnobia tephra Rindge, 1969
