= Thyrinteina =

- A T. leucocerae caterpillar parasitized by Glyptapanteles pupae defends against Supputius cincticeps

Scientific classification
- Kingdom: Animalia
- Phylum: Arthropoda
- Class: Insecta
- Order: Lepidoptera
- Family: Geometridae
- Tribe: Nacophorini
- Genus: Thyrinteina; Möschler, 1890

Genus of moths

Thyrinteina is a genus of moths in the family Geometridae first described by Heinrich Benno Möschler in 1890. Thyrinteina leucocerae caterpillars are parasitized by Glyptapanteles parasitic wasps which inject their eggs into the caterpillar. When wasp larvae are fully grown they exit the caterpillar and pupate nearby. The caterpillar then covers them in silk and will defend the pupating wasps with violent head swings.

== Species ==
- Thyrinteina arnobia (Stoll, 1782)
- Thyrinteina leucocerae
