= List of Glyptapanteles species =

These 309 species belong to the genus Glyptapanteles, braconid wasps.

== Glyptapanteles species ==
- Glyptapanteles acasta (Nixon, 1973)
- Glyptapanteles acherontiae (Cameron, 1907)
- Glyptapanteles acraeae (Wilkinson, 1932)
- Glyptapanteles afiamaluanus (Fullaway, 1941)
- Glyptapanteles africanus (Cameron, 1911)
- Glyptapanteles aggestus (Granger, 1949)
- Glyptapanteles agrotivorus Whitfield, 2002
- Glyptapanteles agynus (de Saeger, 1944)
- Glyptapanteles aithos (Sharma, 1973)
- Glyptapanteles alejandrovalerioi Arias-Penna, 2019
- Glyptapanteles aletta (Nixon, 1973)
- Glyptapanteles alexborisenkoi Arias-Penna, 2019
- Glyptapanteles alexwildi Arias-Penna, 2019
- Glyptapanteles aliphera (Nixon, 1973)
- Glyptapanteles alticola (Ashmead, 1902)
- Glyptapanteles alvarowillei Arias-Penna, 2019
- Glyptapanteles amenophis (de Saeger, 1944)
- Glyptapanteles andrewdebeveci Arias-Penna, 2019
- Glyptapanteles andybennetti Arias-Penna, 2019
- Glyptapanteles andydeansi Arias-Penna, 2019
- Glyptapanteles andysuarezi Arias-Penna, 2019
- Glyptapanteles andywarreni Arias-Penna, 2019
- Glyptapanteles ankitaguptae Arias-Penna, 2019
- Glyptapanteles annettewalkerae Arias-Penna, 2019
- Glyptapanteles antarctiae (Blanchard, 1935)
- Glyptapanteles antinoe (Nixon, 1973)
- Glyptapanteles antsirabensis (Granger, 1949)
- Glyptapanteles anubis (de Saeger, 1944)
- Glyptapanteles arcuatus (Telenga, 1955)
- Glyptapanteles arginae (Bhatnagar, 1950)
- Glyptapanteles argus (de Saeger, 1944)
- Glyptapanteles aristolochiae (Wilkinson, 1928)
- Glyptapanteles artonae (Rohwer, 1926)
- Glyptapanteles ashmeadi (Wilkinson, 1928)
- Glyptapanteles atylana (Nixon, 1965)
- Glyptapanteles aucklandensis (Cameron, 1909)
- Glyptapanteles badgleyi (Wilkinson, 1928)
- Glyptapanteles barneyburksi Arias-Penna, 2019
- Glyptapanteles bataviensis (Rohwer, 1919)
- Glyptapanteles betogarciai Arias-Penna, 2019
- Glyptapanteles bidentatus (Sharma, 1972)
- Glyptapanteles billbrowni Arias-Penna, 2019
- Glyptapanteles bimus Papp, 1990
- Glyptapanteles bistonis (Watanabe, 1934)
- Glyptapanteles bobhanneri Arias-Penna, 2019
- Glyptapanteles bobkulai Arias-Penna, 2019
- Glyptapanteles bobwhartoni Arias-Penna, 2019
- Glyptapanteles boharti Arias-Penna, 2019
- Glyptapanteles borocerae (Granger, 1949)
- Glyptapanteles bourquini (Blanchard, 1936)
- Glyptapanteles breviscuta Song & Chen, 2004
- Glyptapanteles brianestjaquesae Arias-Penna, 2019
- Glyptapanteles caberatae (Muesebeck, 1956)
- Glyptapanteles cacao (Wilkinson, 1934)
- Glyptapanteles cadei (Risbec, 1951)
- Glyptapanteles caffreyi (Muesebeck, 1921)
- Glyptapanteles callidus (Haliday, 1834)
- Glyptapanteles capeki (Györfi, 1955)
- Glyptapanteles carinachicaizae Arias-Penna, 2019
- Glyptapanteles carinatus (Szépligeti, 1913)
- Glyptapanteles carlhuffakeri Arias-Penna, 2019
- Glyptapanteles carlossarmientoi Arias-Penna, 2019
- Glyptapanteles carlrettenmeyeri Arias-Penna, 2019
- Glyptapanteles cassianus (Riley, 1881)
- Glyptapanteles celsoazevedoi Arias-Penna, 2019
- Glyptapanteles charlesmicheneri Arias-Penna, 2019
- Glyptapanteles charlesporteri Arias-Penna, 2019
- Glyptapanteles chidra Rousse & Gupta, 2013
- Glyptapanteles chrisdarlingi Arias-Penna, 2019
- Glyptapanteles chrisgrinteri Arias-Penna, 2019
- Glyptapanteles christerhanssoni Arias-Penna, 2019
- Glyptapanteles cinyras (de Saeger, 1944)
- Glyptapanteles clanisae Gupta, 2013
- Glyptapanteles claudiamartinezae Arias-Penna, 2019
- Glyptapanteles colemani (Viereck, 1912)
- Glyptapanteles compressiventris (Muesebeck, 1921)
- Glyptapanteles compressus (Muesebeck, 1919)
- Glyptapanteles concinnus (Muesebeck, 1958)
- Glyptapanteles corbetti (Wilkinson, 1928)
- Glyptapanteles corriemoreauae Arias-Penna, 2019
- Glyptapanteles creatonoti (Viereck, 1912)
- Glyptapanteles dalosoma de Santis, 1987
- Glyptapanteles darjeelingensis (Sharma & Chatterjee, 1970)
- Glyptapanteles daveroubiki Arias-Penna, 2019
- Glyptapanteles daveschindeli Arias-Penna, 2019
- Glyptapanteles davesmithi Arias-Penna, 2019
- Glyptapanteles davidwahli Arias-Penna, 2019
- Glyptapanteles deliasa Austin & Dangerfield, 1992
- Glyptapanteles diegocamposi Arias-Penna, 2019
- Glyptapanteles distatus Papp, 1990
- Glyptapanteles donquickei Arias-Penna, 2019
- Glyptapanteles dorislagosae Arias-Penna, 2019
- Glyptapanteles ecuadorius Whitfield, 2002
- Glyptapanteles edgardpalacioi Arias-Penna, 2019
- Glyptapanteles edwinnarvaezi Arias-Penna, 2019
- Glyptapanteles eowilsoni Arias-Penna, 2019
- Glyptapanteles erictepei Arias-Penna, 2019
- Glyptapanteles eryphanidis (Whitfield, 2011)
- Glyptapanteles eucosmae (Wilkinson, 1929)
- Glyptapanteles euproctisiphagus (Ahmad, 1945)
- Glyptapanteles eutelus (de Saeger, 1941)
- Glyptapanteles fabiae (Wilkinson, 1928)
- Glyptapanteles felipesotoi Arias-Penna, 2019
- Glyptapanteles femoratus Ashmead, 1906
- Glyptapanteles ferfernandezi Arias-Penna, 2019
- Glyptapanteles ficus (Granger, 1949)
- Glyptapanteles flavicoxis (Marsh, 1979)
- Glyptapanteles flavovariatus (Muesebeck, 1921)
- Glyptapanteles floridanus (Muesebeck, 1921)
- Glyptapanteles fraternus (Reinhard, 1880)
- Glyptapanteles fullawayi Austin & Dangerfield, 1992
- Glyptapanteles fulvigaster (Granger, 1949)
- Glyptapanteles fulvipes (Haliday, 1834)
- Glyptapanteles fuscinervis (Cameron, 1911)
- Glyptapanteles gahinga (de Saeger, 1944)
- Glyptapanteles garygibsoni Arias-Penna, 2019
- Glyptapanteles gavinbroadi Arias-Penna, 2019
- Glyptapanteles genorodriguezae Arias-Penna, 2019
- Glyptapanteles gerarddelvarei Arias-Penna, 2019
- Glyptapanteles globatus (Linnaeus, 1758)
- Glyptapanteles glyphodes (Wilkinson, 1932)
- Glyptapanteles gowdeyi (Gahan, 1918)
- Glyptapanteles grantgentryi Arias-Penna, 2019
- Glyptapanteles guierae (Risbec, 1951)
- Glyptapanteles gunnarbrehmi Arias-Penna, 2019
- Glyptapanteles guyanensis (Cameron, 1911)
- Glyptapanteles haroldgreeneyi Arias-Penna, 2019
- Glyptapanteles harrisinae (Muesebeck, 1953)
- Glyptapanteles helmuthaguirrei Arias-Penna, 2019
- Glyptapanteles henryhespenheidei Arias-Penna, 2019
- Glyptapanteles henrytownesi Arias-Penna, 2019
- Glyptapanteles herbertii (Ashmead, 1900)
- Glyptapanteles horus (de Saeger, 1944)
- Glyptapanteles howelldalyi Arias-Penna, 2019
- Glyptapanteles hugokonsi Arias-Penna, 2019
- Glyptapanteles hydroeciae (You & Xiong, 1983)
- Glyptapanteles hypermnestrae Gupta & Pereira, 2012
- Glyptapanteles iangauldi Arias-Penna, 2019
- Glyptapanteles ianyarrowi Arias-Penna, 2019
- Glyptapanteles ilarisaaksjarvi Arias-Penna, 2019
- Glyptapanteles inclusus (Ratzeburg, 1844)
- Glyptapanteles indiensis (Marsh, 1979)
- Glyptapanteles intermedius (Balevski, 1980)
- Glyptapanteles intricatus (de Saeger, 1944)
- Glyptapanteles jacklonginoi Arias-Penna, 2019
- Glyptapanteles jamesrobertsoni Arias-Penna, 2019
- Glyptapanteles jaquioconnorae Arias-Penna, 2019
- Glyptapanteles jeremydewaardi Arias-Penna, 2019
- Glyptapanteles jerrypowelli Arias-Penna, 2019
- Glyptapanteles jesusugaldei Arias-Penna, 2019
- Glyptapanteles jimmilleri Arias-Penna, 2019
- Glyptapanteles jjrodriguezae Arias-Penna, 2019
- Glyptapanteles johnburnsi Arias-Penna, 2019
- Glyptapanteles johnheratyi Arias-Penna, 2019
- Glyptapanteles johnlasallei Arias-Penna, 2019
- Glyptapanteles johnnoyesi Arias-Penna, 2019
- Glyptapanteles johnstiremani Arias-Penna, 2019
- Glyptapanteles josesimbanai Arias-Penna, 2019
- Glyptapanteles juanvargasi Arias-Penna, 2019
- Glyptapanteles jumamuturii Arias-Penna, 2019
- Glyptapanteles keithwillmotti Arias-Penna, 2019
- Glyptapanteles kevinjohnsoni Arias-Penna, 2019
- Glyptapanteles kyleparksi Arias-Penna, 2019
- Glyptapanteles lamborni (Wilkinson, 1928)
- Glyptapanteles lamprosemae (Wilkinson, 1928)
- Glyptapanteles laxatus (Wilkinson, 1930)
- Glyptapanteles lefevrei (de Saeger, 1941)
- Glyptapanteles leucotretae (Ullyett, 1946)
- Glyptapanteles linghsiuae Arias-Penna, 2019
- Glyptapanteles liparidis (Bouché, 1834)
- Glyptapanteles lissopleurus (de Saeger, 1944)
- Glyptapanteles longiantennatus (You & Xiong, 1987)
- Glyptapanteles longistigma Chen & Song, 2004
- Glyptapanteles longivena Chen & Song, 2004
- Glyptapanteles lubomasneri Arias-Penna, 2019
- Glyptapanteles luchosalagajei Arias-Penna, 2019
- Glyptapanteles luciana (Nixon, 1973)
- Glyptapanteles lucidus (Sharma, 1972)
- Glyptapanteles luteipennis (Muesebeck, 1921)
- Glyptapanteles maculitarsis (Cameron, 1905)
- Glyptapanteles madecassus (Granger, 1949)
- Glyptapanteles majalis (Wesmael, 1837)
- Glyptapanteles malleyneae Arias-Penna, 2019
- Glyptapanteles malloryvanwyngaardenae Arias-Penna, 2019
- Glyptapanteles malthacae (Muesebeck, 1958)
- Glyptapanteles mamiae Arias-Penna, 2019
- Glyptapanteles marcelotavaresi Arias-Penna, 2019
- Glyptapanteles marcepsteini Arias-Penna, 2019
- Glyptapanteles marcpolleti Arias-Penna, 2019
- Glyptapanteles marjorietownesae Arias-Penna, 2019
- Glyptapanteles markshawi Arias-Penna, 2019
- Glyptapanteles marquesi (Brèthes, 1924)
- Glyptapanteles marshawheelerae Arias-Penna, 2019
- Glyptapanteles meganmiltonae Arias-Penna, 2019
- Glyptapanteles megistusocellus Song & Chen, 2004
- Glyptapanteles mehrdadhajibabaei Arias-Penna, 2019
- Glyptapanteles melanotus (de Saeger, 1944)
- Glyptapanteles melissus (de Saeger, 1944)
- Glyptapanteles menander (Nixon, 1973)
- Glyptapanteles merope (Nixon, 1965)
- Glyptapanteles michelleduennesae Arias-Penna, 2019
- Glyptapanteles mikegatesi Arias-Penna, 2019
- Glyptapanteles mikepoguei Arias-Penna, 2019
- Glyptapanteles mikeschauffi Arias-Penna, 2019
- Glyptapanteles mikesharkeyi Arias-Penna, 2019
- Glyptapanteles militaris (Walsh, 1861)
- Glyptapanteles minor Ashmead, 1906
- Glyptapanteles mnesampela Austin, 2000
- Glyptapanteles montywoodi Arias-Penna, 2019
- Glyptapanteles muesebecki (Blanchard, 1947)
- Glyptapanteles mygdonia (Nixon, 1973)
- Glyptapanteles naromae (Risbec, 1951)
- Glyptapanteles nataliaivanovae Arias-Penna, 2019
- Glyptapanteles nealweberi Arias-Penna, 2019
- Glyptapanteles neoliparidis Chen & Song, 2004
- Glyptapanteles nepitae (Wilkinson, 1934)
- Glyptapanteles nigerrimus (Roman, 1924)
- Glyptapanteles nigrescens (Cameron, 1906)
- Glyptapanteles nigricornis (Muesebeck, 1921)
- Glyptapanteles ninazitaniae Arias-Penna, 2019
- Glyptapanteles ninus (de Saeger, 1944)
- Glyptapanteles nivalis (Papp, 1983)
- Glyptapanteles nkuli (de Saeger, 1941)
- Glyptapanteles obliquae (Wilkinson, 1928)
- Glyptapanteles octonarius (Ratzeburg, 1852)
- Glyptapanteles operculinae (Fullaway, 1941)
- Glyptapanteles pachopinasi Arias-Penna, 2019
- Glyptapanteles palabundus (Tobias, 1986)
- Glyptapanteles pallipes (Reinhard, 1880)
- Glyptapanteles pamitchellae Arias-Penna, 2019
- Glyptapanteles parasundanus (Bhatnagar, 1950)
- Glyptapanteles paulhansoni Arias-Penna, 2019
- Glyptapanteles paulheberti Arias-Penna, 2019
- Glyptapanteles paulhurdi Arias-Penna, 2019
- Glyptapanteles penelope (Nixon, 1965)
- Glyptapanteles penelopeus (Tobias, 1986)
- Glyptapanteles penthocratus (Austin, 1987)
- Glyptapanteles petermarzi Arias-Penna, 2019
- Glyptapanteles phildevriesi Arias-Penna, 2019
- Glyptapanteles philippinensis (Ashmead, 1904)
- Glyptapanteles philocampus (Cameron, 1911)
- Glyptapanteles philwardi Arias-Penna, 2019
- Glyptapanteles phoebe (Nixon, 1965)
- Glyptapanteles phragmataeciae (You & Zhou, 1990)
- Glyptapanteles phytometraduplus (Shenefelt, 1972)
- Glyptapanteles phytometrae (Wilkinson, 1928)
- Glyptapanteles pinicola (Lyle, 1917)
- Glyptapanteles politus (Riley, 1881)
- Glyptapanteles popovi (Telenga, 1955)
- Glyptapanteles porthetriae (Muesebeck, 1928)
- Glyptapanteles praesens (Muesebeck, 1947)
- Glyptapanteles propylae (de Saeger, 1941)
- Glyptapanteles pseudacraeae Donaldson, 1991
- Glyptapanteles pseudotsugae Fernandez-Triana, 2018
- Glyptapanteles puera (Wilkinson, 1928)
- Glyptapanteles rafamanitioi Arias-Penna, 2019
- Glyptapanteles ripus (Papp, 1983)
- Glyptapanteles robbinthorpi Arias-Penna, 2019
- Glyptapanteles ronaldzunigai Arias-Penna, 2019
- Glyptapanteles roysnellingi Arias-Penna, 2019
- Glyptapanteles rubens (Reinhard, 1880)
- Glyptapanteles sagmaria (Nixon, 1965)
- Glyptapanteles salepus (Papp, 1983)
- Glyptapanteles sarrothripae (Weed, 1887)
- Glyptapanteles scottmilleri Arias-Penna, 2019
- Glyptapanteles scottshawi Arias-Penna, 2019
- Glyptapanteles seydeli (de Saeger, 1941)
- Glyptapanteles shelbystedenfeldae Arias-Penna, 2019
- Glyptapanteles sibiricus (Papp, 1983)
- Glyptapanteles siderion (Nixon, 1965)
- Glyptapanteles simus (de Saeger, 1944)
- Glyptapanteles sondrawardae Arias-Penna, 2019
- Glyptapanteles speciosissimus (Granger, 1949)
- Glyptapanteles spilosomae (de Saeger, 1941)
- Glyptapanteles spodopterae Ahmad, 2009
- Glyptapanteles stackelbergi (Telenga, 1955)
- Glyptapanteles stephaniecluttsae Arias-Penna, 2019
- Glyptapanteles stephaniekirkae Arias-Penna, 2019
- Glyptapanteles subpunctatus (Granger, 1949)
- Glyptapanteles sujeevanratnasinghami Arias-Penna, 2019
- Glyptapanteles suniae Arias-Penna, 2019
- Glyptapanteles sureshnaiki Arias-Penna, 2019
- Glyptapanteles suzannegreenae Arias-Penna, 2019
- Glyptapanteles sydneycameronae Arias-Penna, 2019
- Glyptapanteles taniaariasae Arias-Penna, 2019
- Glyptapanteles tanyadapkeyae Arias-Penna, 2019
- Glyptapanteles taylori (Wilkinson, 1928)
- Glyptapanteles theivorae (Shenefelt, 1972)
- Glyptapanteles thespis (de Saeger, 1944)
- Glyptapanteles thibautdelsinnei Arias-Penna, 2019
- Glyptapanteles thomaspapei Arias-Penna, 2019
- Glyptapanteles thompsoni (Lyle, 1927)
- Glyptapanteles thoseae (Wilkinson, 1934)
- Glyptapanteles toluagunbiadeae Arias-Penna, 2019
- Glyptapanteles tomwallai Arias-Penna, 2019
- Glyptapanteles trilochae Gupta, 2013
- Glyptapanteles vafer (Nixon, 1965)
- Glyptapanteles venustus (de Saeger, 1944)
- Glyptapanteles victoriapookae Arias-Penna, 2019
- Glyptapanteles vitripennis (Curtis, 1830)
- Glyptapanteles websteri (Muesebeck, 1921)
- Glyptapanteles wilkinsoni (Fahringer, 1936)
- Glyptapanteles wilmersimbanai Arias-Penna, 2019
- Glyptapanteles wonyoungchoi Arias-Penna, 2019
- Glyptapanteles yalizhangae Arias-Penna, 2019
- Glyptapanteles yanayacuensis Arias-Penna, 2019
