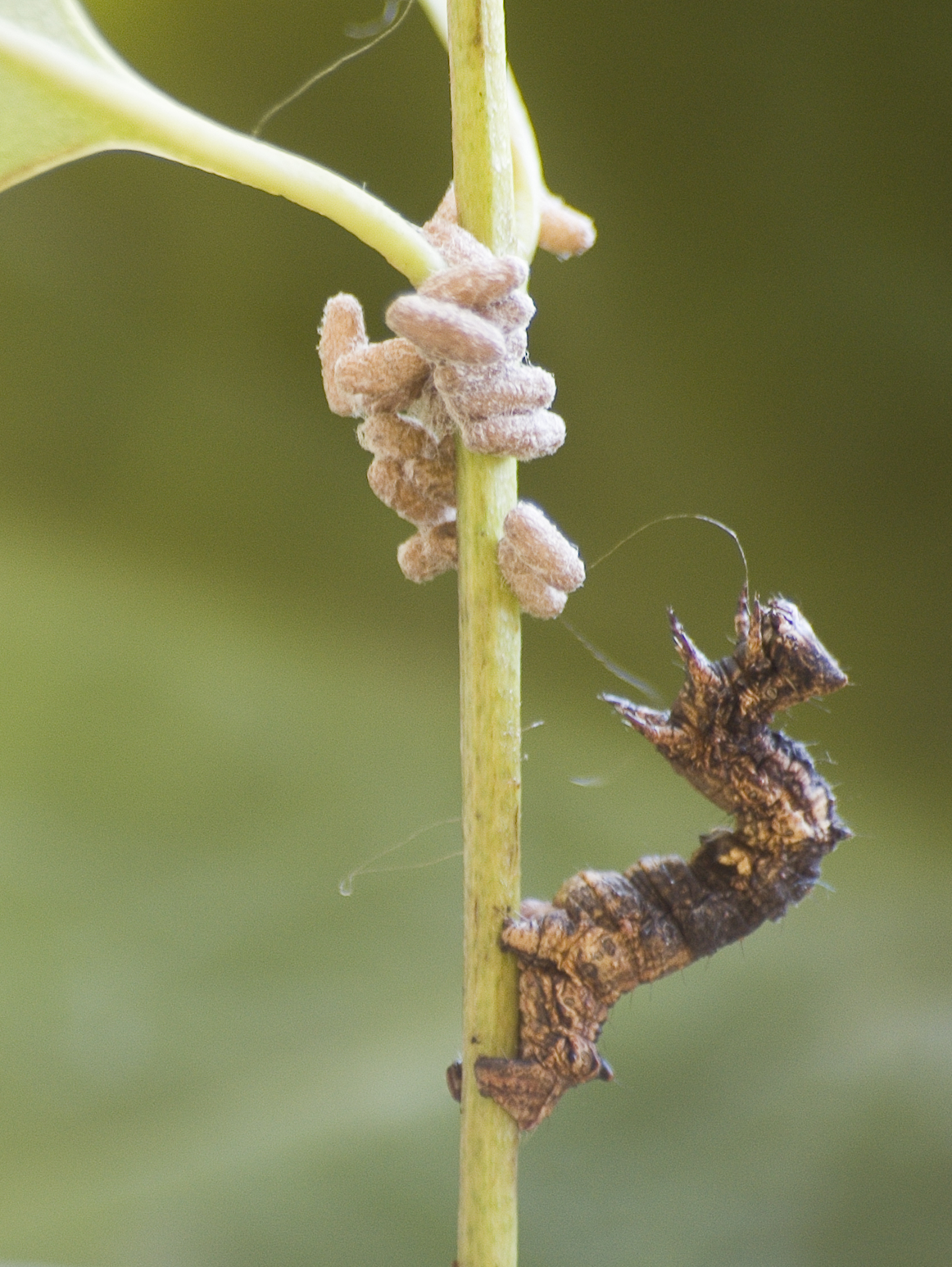
- A caterpillar of the geometrid moth Thyrinteina leucocerae with pupae of the braconid parasitoid wasp Glyptapanteles sp.

Scientific classification
- Domain: Eukaryota
- Kingdom: Animalia
- Phylum: Arthropoda
- Class: Insecta
- Order: Hymenoptera
- Family: Braconidae
- Subfamily: Microgastrinae
- Genus: Glyptapanteles; Ashmead, 1904

Diversity
- at least 300 species

= Glyptapanteles =

Genus of wasps

Glyptapanteles is a genus of endoparasitoid wasps found in all continents, except Antarctica. The larvae of Glyptapanteles species are able to manipulate their hosts into serving as bodyguards.

== Reproduction ==
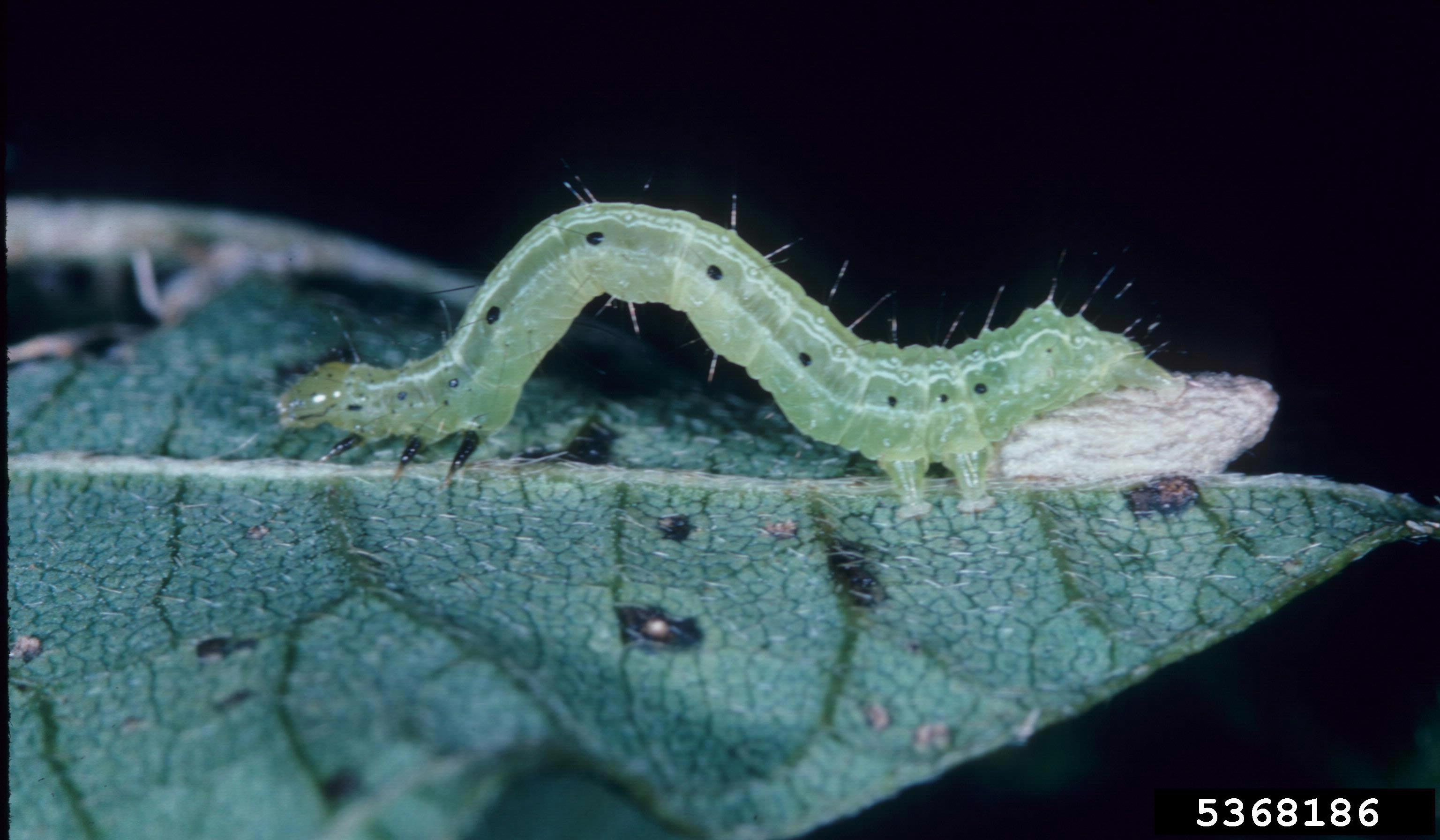
Glyptapanteles phytometrae and host Chrysodeixis chalcites

Female Glyptapanteles oviposit into caterpillar hosts. The caterpillar continues to grow and feed normally until the 4th or 5th instar, whereupon up to 80 fully grown larvae emerge from its body to pupate. Some species parasitized by Glyptapanteles include Lymantria dispar, Chrysodeixis chalcites, Thyrinteina leucocerae (both pictured), and Acronicta rumicis.

According to a study done in South Korea on the species G. liparidis, the parasitoid tends to prefer to feed on the second-instar A. rumicis larva, indicating that the stage of caterpillar life may have significant role in maximizing nutrient intake.

== Behavior alteration ==
After the larvae of Glyptapanteles sp. emerge, the caterpillar takes up position near the cocoons of the pupae, arches its back, and ceases to move or feed. It will occasionally spin silk over the pupae. However, when disturbed, it begins to thrash violently. No longer inclined to eat, the affected caterpillar eventually dies. It has been demonstrated in experimental research (Grosman, et al.) that this behavior is to strike at and repel possible predators of the pupae, such as the shield bug Supputius cincticeps, thus improving their survival odds. Only about one in twenty non-parasitized caterpillars responded in this fashion. In 60% of cases, the parasitized caterpillars successfully warded off these potential predators. Mortality rates for pupae not guarded by parasitized caterpillars were significantly higher. That it is of no demonstrated benefit to the caterpillar indicates that this is an adaptation on the part of Glyptapanteles.

=== Mechanism ===
In the course of Grosman's research, it was discovered that not all larval Glyptapanteles emerge from their caterpillar host; one or two remain behind. Grosman has theorized that these larvae manipulate the host, foregoing their own chance at pupating in order to protect the brood.

== Biocontrol ==
G. flavicoxis, G. porthetriae and G. militaris have been evaluated by the USDA as possible bio-control agents for containing the invasive spongy moth (Lymantria dispar) population in the United States. Research has indicated that Pseudaletia unipuncta hosts fed fresh perennial ryegrass (Lolium perenne) leaves are optimal for the mass-breeding of G. militaris.

== See also ==
- Hymenoepimecis argyraphaga, a species of parasitoid wasp with similar larval ability to manipulate hosts to its own ends.
- Ampulex compressa, or the "Emerald cockroach wasp", a wasp capable of debilitating cockroaches into serving as docile hosts for its eggs.
