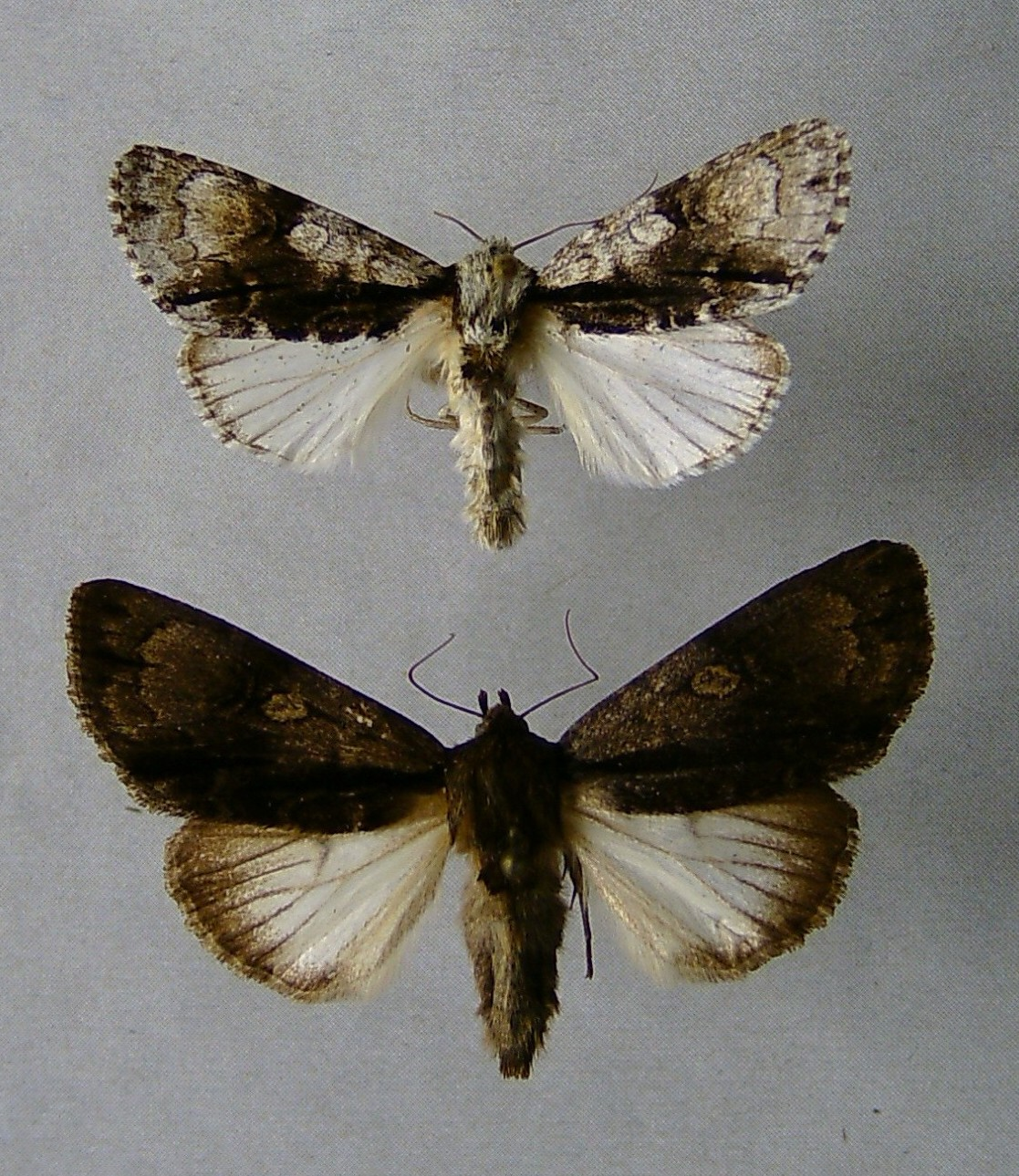

Scientific classification
- Kingdom: Animalia
- Phylum: Arthropoda
- Clade: Pancrustacea
- Class: Insecta
- Order: Lepidoptera
- Superfamily: Noctuoidea
- Family: Noctuidae
- Genus: Acronicta
- Species: A. alni

Binomial name
- Acronicta alni (Linnaeus, 1767)

Synonyms
- Phalaena alni Linnaeus, 1767

= Acronicta alni =

Species of moth

Acronicta alni, the alder moth, is a moth of the family Noctuidae. It is found in Europe (from southern Fennoscandia to Spain, Italy and the Balkans), Turkey, the European part of Russia and the neighbouring countries, the Caucasus, the Ural, southern Siberia, Transbaikalia, the Russian Far East (Primorye, Sakhalin, southern Kuriles, Khabarovsk and the Amur region), China, Japan (Hokkaido and Honshu) and the Korean Peninsula.

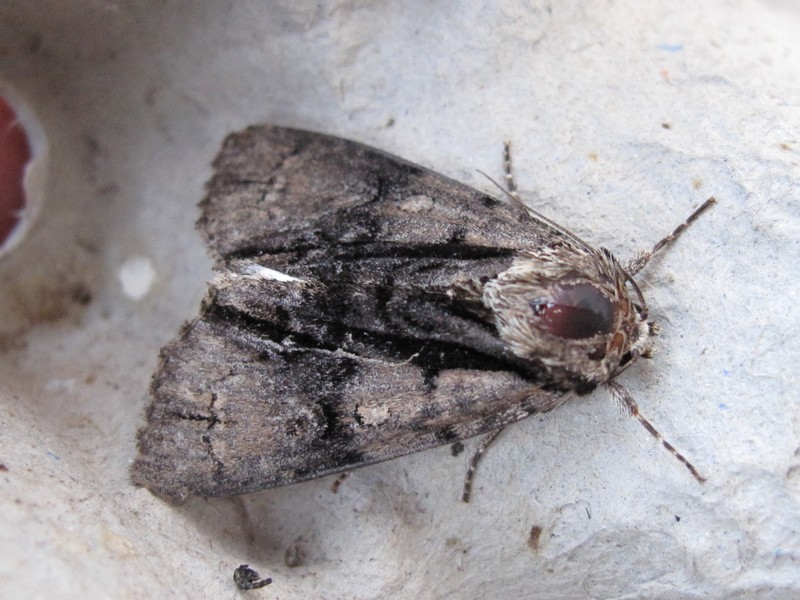
Acronicta alni

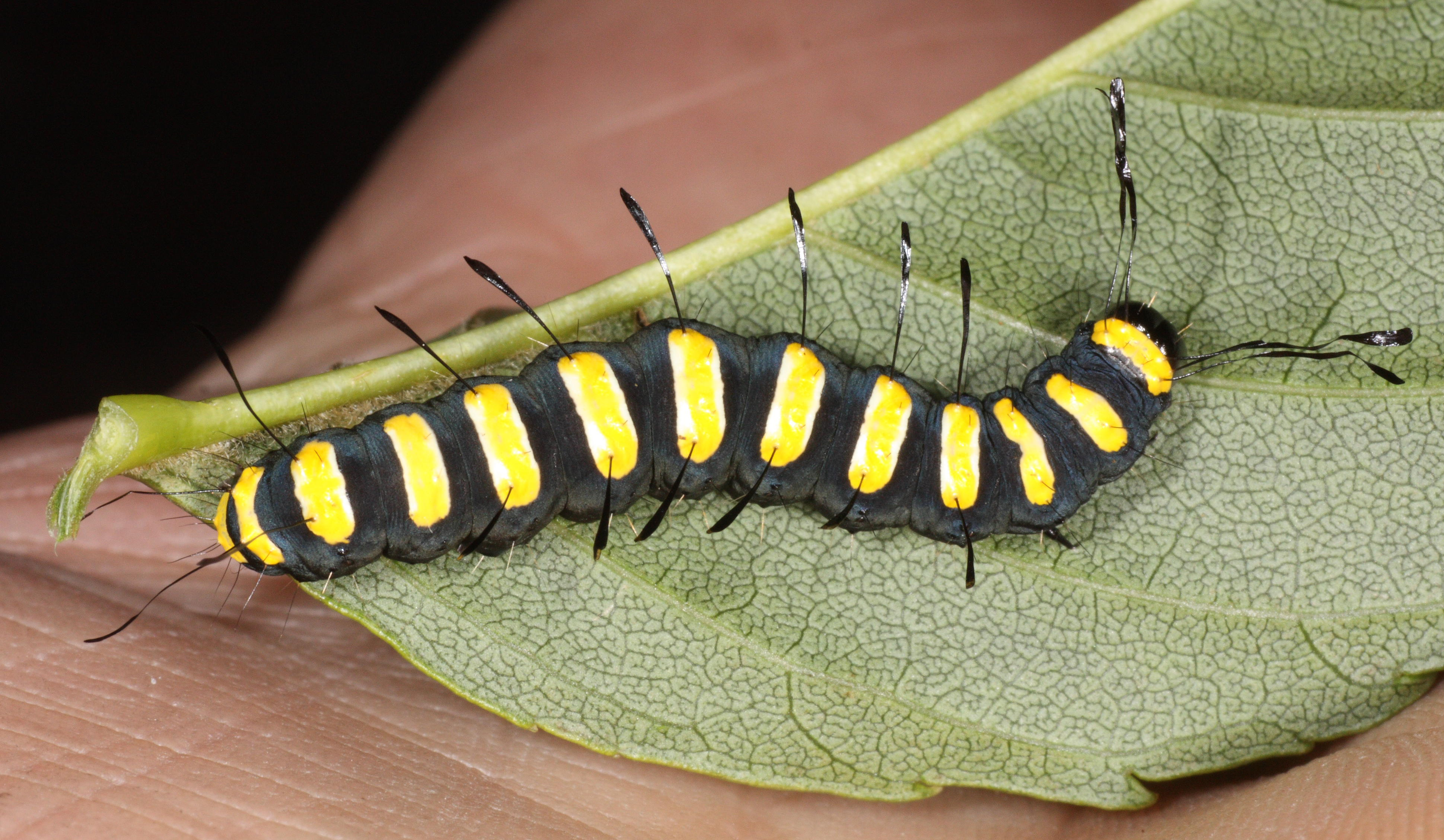
Caterpillar

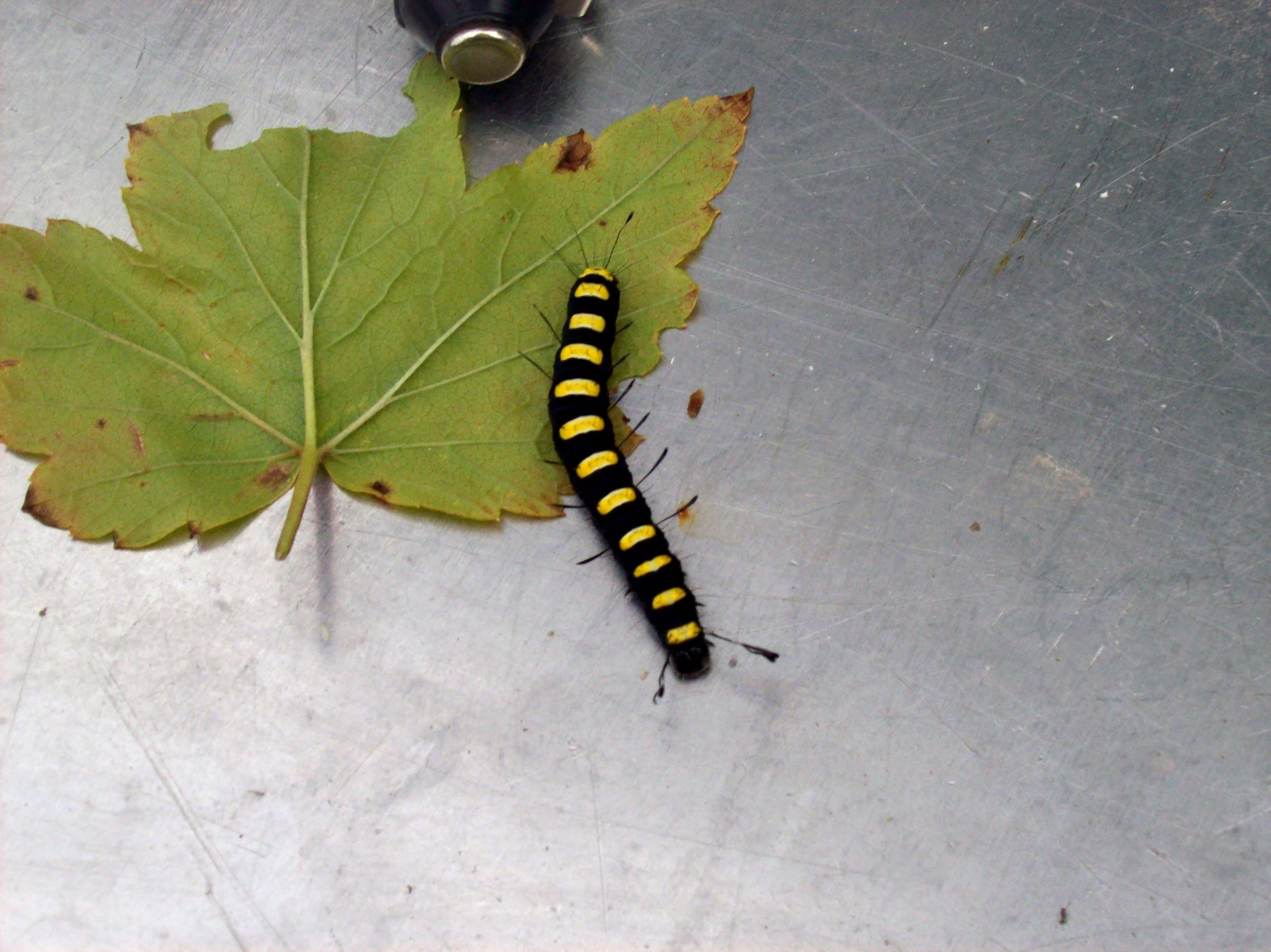
Caterpillar on leaf

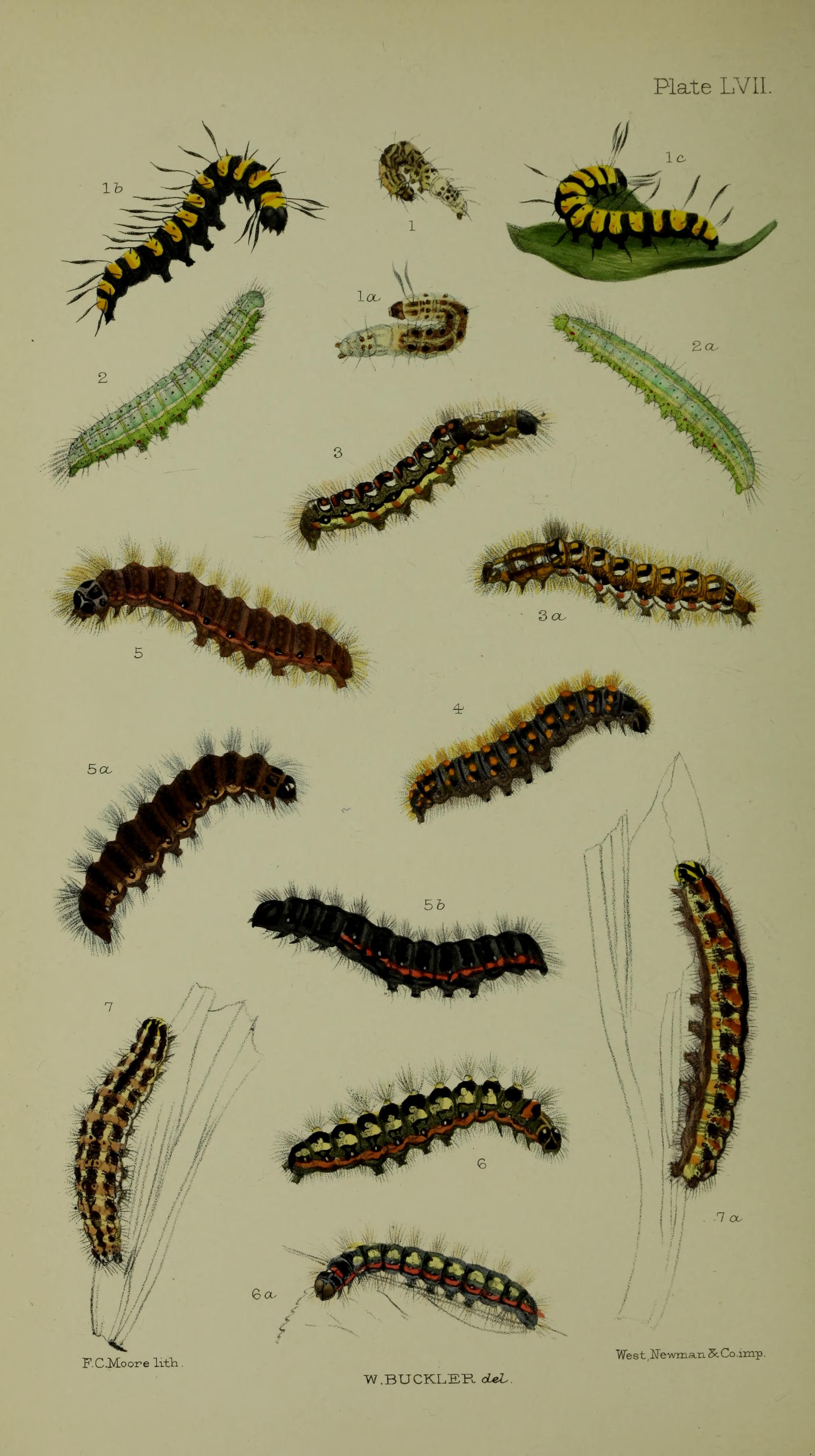
Young larva at the "bird dirt" stage and final instar larva (figs.1,1a,1b)

== Notes ==
- The flight season refers to the British Isles. This may vary in other parts of the range.
