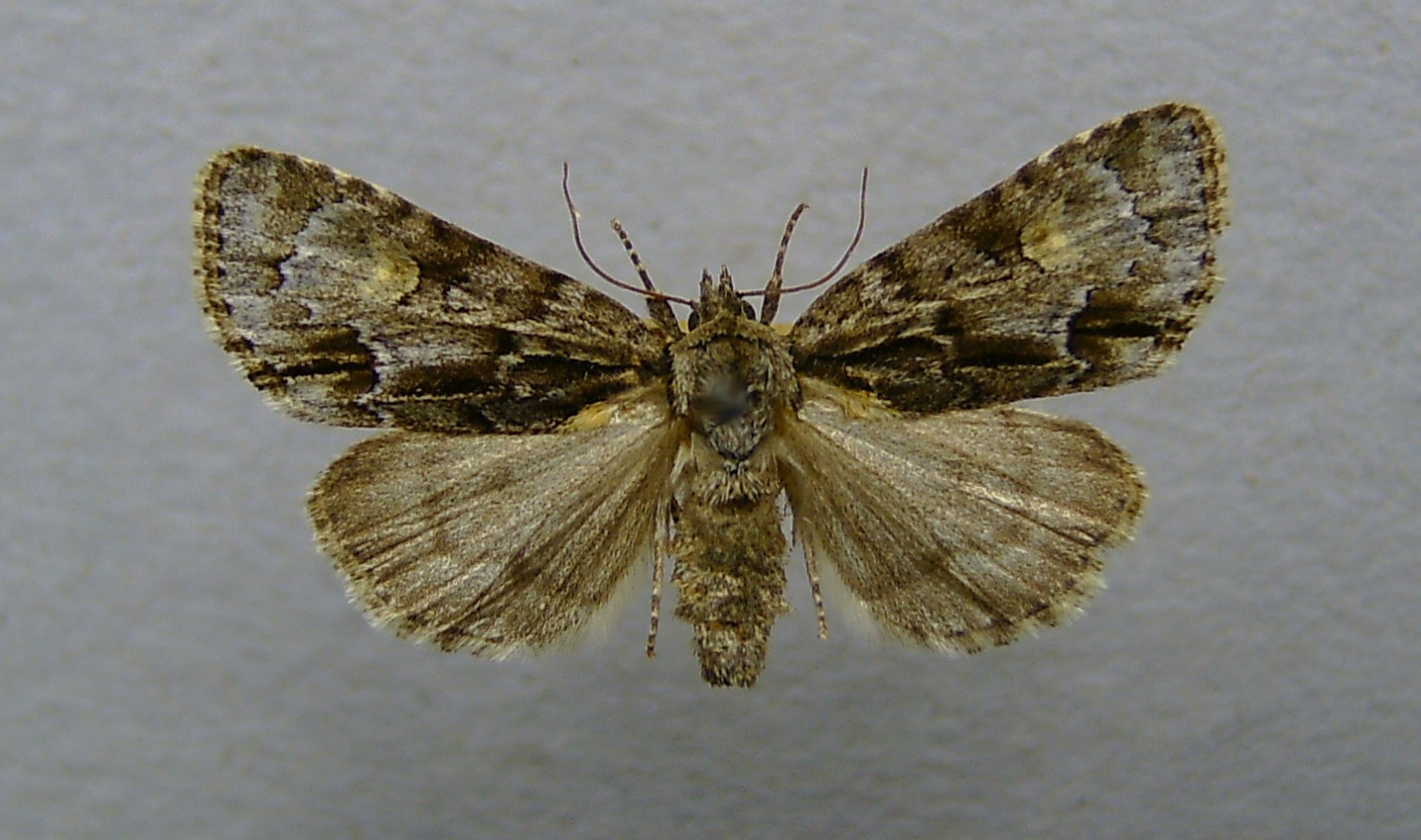

Scientific classification
- Kingdom: Animalia
- Phylum: Arthropoda
- Clade: Pancrustacea
- Class: Insecta
- Order: Lepidoptera
- Superfamily: Noctuoidea
- Family: Noctuidae
- Genus: Acronicta
- Species: A. strigosa

Binomial name
- Acronicta strigosa (Denis & Schiffermüller, 1775)

Synonyms
- Noctua strigosa Denis & Schiffermuller 1775; Phalaena Noctua favillacea Esper 1775; Acronicta terrigena Graeser 1892

= Acronicta strigosa =

Marsh dagger

Species of moth

Acronicta strigosa, the marsh dagger, is a moth of the family Noctuidae. It is distributed through most of Europe, east to the Caucasus, northern China, Korea and Japan.

== Technical description and variation ==
A. strigosa F. (= favillacea Esp.) (3e). Forewing pale grey, tinged with ochreous; base of inner margin yellow: reniform stigma externally yellowish; a broken black streak along submedian fold. Larva velvety green, with broad redbrown dorsal band; hairs scattered and fine; dorsum humped on segment 12; like the larva of Cerura, which it resembles superficially in colour and ornamentation, it changes from green to dull purplish before spinning up; fullfed in autumn; on hawthorn, which is its only foodplant in Britain, though continental writers give sloe and Rhamnus. — ab. bryophiloides Horm. (— casparii Steinert) (3 e) is a smaller form with the forewings wholly dark grey. -- Japanese specimens are considerably larger than European and much darker; the stigmata more strongly indicated, and the black dashes thicker; they may be distinguished as adaucta subsp. nov. (3e). The wingspan is approximately 32 mm. The caterpillars appear in two colour variants, either green with a brown back or completely brown. They have few short, fine hairs. The slender pupa is light brown colored. The cremaster is short and equipped with thorns.

== Biology ==
A. strigosa is found in floodplain forests as well as stream and river valleys with high humidity, and in moderately warm climates. In the Alps, they do not rise above 1200 metres. The adults fly in June and July. They are attracted to light.

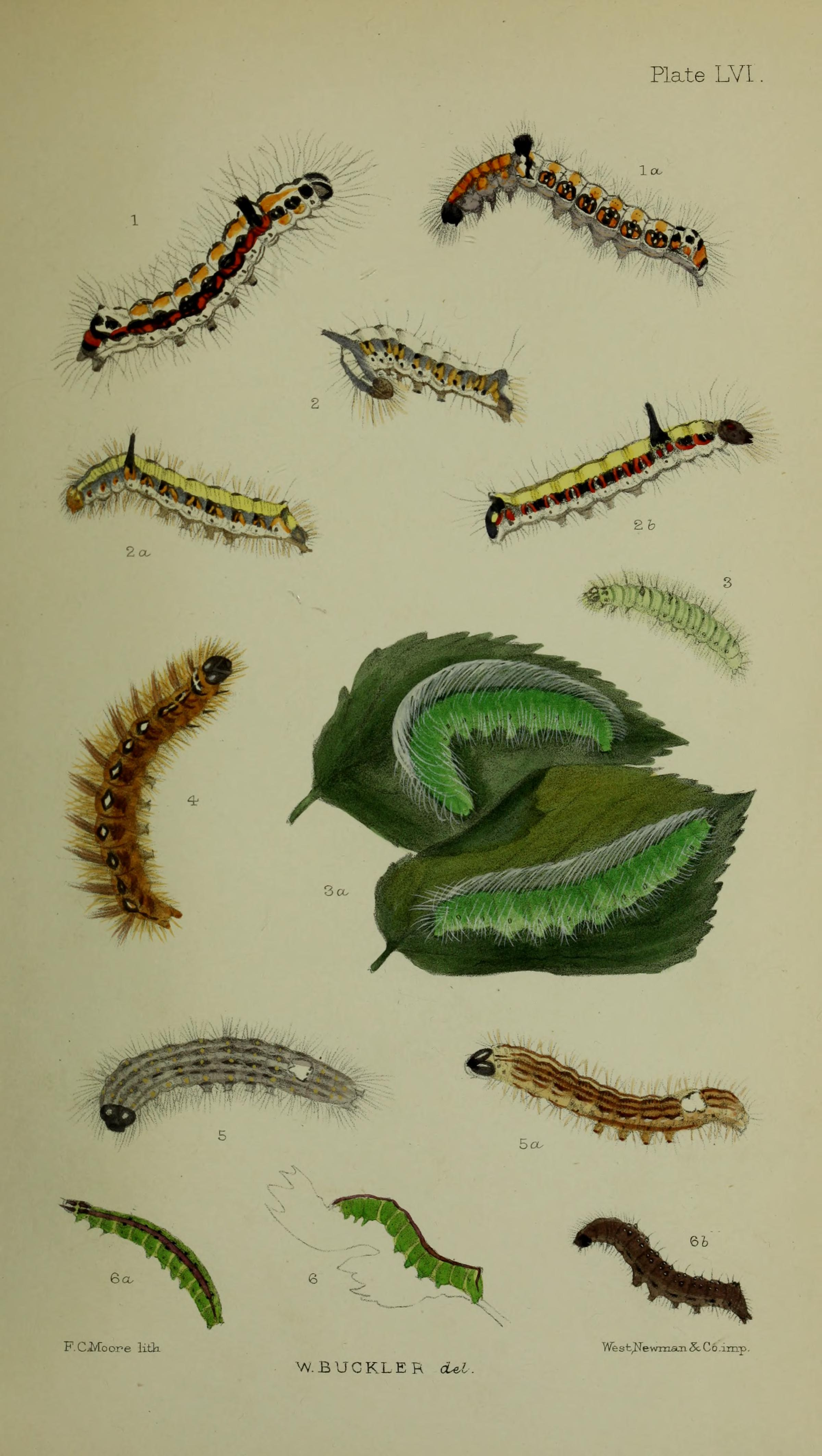
Figs 6, 6a, 6b larvae after final moult

The larvae feed mainly on hawthorn and sometimes blackthorn.

== Notes ==
1. The flight season refers to the British Isles. This may vary in other parts of the range.
