= Tinea texta =

Conservation status
- Naturally Uncommon (NZ TCS)

Scientific classification
- Kingdom: Animalia
- Phylum: Arthropoda
- Clade: Pancrustacea
- Class: Insecta
- Order: Lepidoptera
- Family: Tineidae
- Genus: Tinea
- Species: T. texta

Binomial name
- Tinea texta Meyrick, 1931

Species of moth endemic to New Zealand

Tinea texta is a species of moth in the family Tineidae. It was first described by Edward Meyrick in 1931. The placement of this species within the genus Tinea is in doubt. As a result, this species is currently also known as be as Tinea (s.l.) texta. This species is endemic to New Zealand and has been observed on the North Island. Adults are on the wing from November until February. In 2025 this species was classified as having the conservation threat classification of "At Risk, Uncommon" by the Department of Conservation.

== Taxonomy ==
This species was first described by Edward Meyrick in 1931 using a specimen collected at Whangārei in January. George Hudson discussed and illustrated this species in his 1939 book A supplement to the butterflies and moths of New Zealand. In 1988 John S. Dugdale stated that the female holotype was not in the Natural History Museum, London.

== Description ==
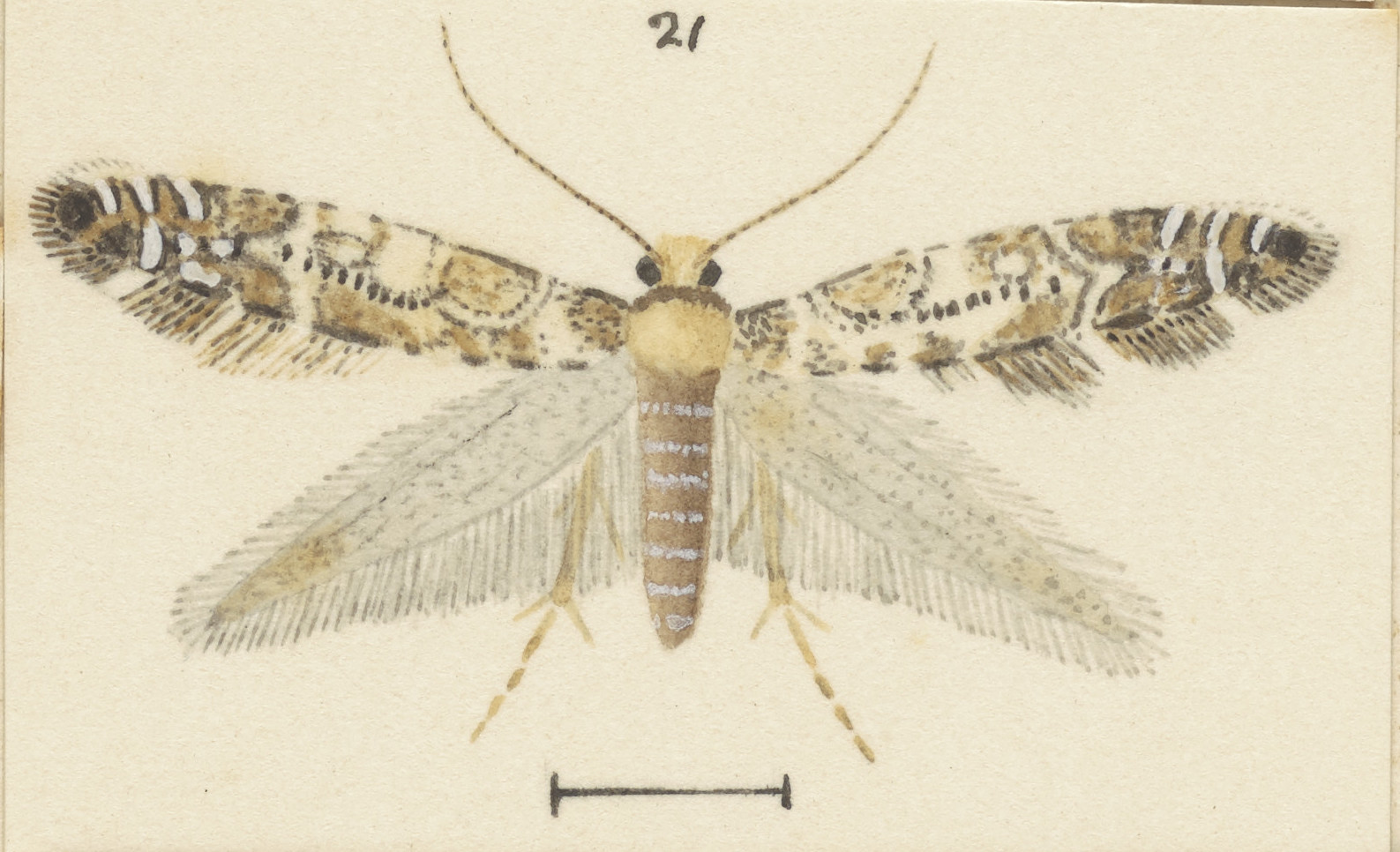
Hudson's illustration of a paler female.

Meyrick described the female adult of this species as follows:

♀ 7 mm. Head whitish centrally mixed fuscous. Palpi fuscous tip white. Thorax whitish mixed dark fuscous. Forewings light fuscous; first half of wing occupied by three obscure whitish angulated fasciae irregularly edged dark fuscous, third broadest and angle reaching beyond middle of disc; an oblique white strigula from costa about ⅔, and three small white spots between this and apex, wing beneath these irregularly irrorated whitish, some dark fuscous scales, a fine white erect strigula from middle of termen; a small suffused black apical spot: cilia greyish, two dark fuscous lines. Hindwings and cilia light grey.

Hudson described the adults of this species as follows:

The expansion of the wings is about 3/8 inch (7-10 mm.). The fore-wings are bronzy-yellowish-broion, with slight purplish reflections, paler in the female; basal half of wing with three obscure whitish angulated bands, irregularly edged with greyish black, third broadest and angle reaching beyond middle of disc; an oblique white strigula from costa at about 2/3, and three small white spots between this and apex; an irregular chain of white dots in disc separated by blackish marks; a fine white erect strigula from middle of termen, very small in male; a small cloudy black spot at apex; the cilia are grey barred with white in proximity to the paler wing markings. The hind-wings and cilia are grey, paler in female.

Hudson pointed out that this species appears externally very similar to Tinea accusatrix.

== Distribution ==
T. texta is endemic to New Zealand. It is found in the North Island.

== Behaviour ==
Adults are on the wing from November until February.

== Conservation status ==
In 2025 this species was classified by the New Zealand Department of Conservation as "at risk, uncommon" under the New Zealand Threat Classification System. This species obtained this classification as it is regarded as being biologically sparse, there is a lack of data on both the population size as well as how the population of this species is changing over time and is regarded as relict. Previous conservation threat assessments had classified this moth as "data deficient".
