= Metaphatus cirrhus =

Scientific classification
- Kingdom: Animalia
- Phylum: Arthropoda
- Class: Insecta
- Order: Lepidoptera
- Family: Palaephatidae
- Genus: Metaphatus
- Species: M. cirrhus

Binomial name
- Metaphatus cirrhus Davis, 1986

Moth species in family Palaephatidae

Metaphatus cirrhus is a moth of the family Palaephatidae. It was described by Donald R. Davis in 1986. It is found in the dry Nothofagus forests of central Chile.

The length of the forewings is 8–10 mm for males and 8.5–11 mm for females. Adults have yellowish brown forewings, lightly marked with brown. They are on wing from December to January in one generation per year.

== Etymology ==
The specific name is derived from Greek kirrhos (meaning tawny or brownish yellow) and refers to the general color of the species.
