= Palaephatus dimorphus =

Scientific classification
- Domain: Eukaryota
- Kingdom: Animalia
- Phylum: Arthropoda
- Class: Insecta
- Order: Lepidoptera
- Family: Palaephatidae
- Genus: Palaephatus
- Species: P. dimorphus

Binomial name
- Palaephatus dimorphus Davis, 1986

Moth species in family Palaephatidae

Palaephatus dimorphus is a moth of the family Palaephatidae. It is found in much of the southern temperate forests of montane Argentina and Chile.

The length of the forewings is 12–13 mm for males and 13–15 mm for females. Adults have brownish forewings. In males, these are mottled with darker brown to fuscous. Females have whitish buff forewings and similar markings as the males, but the pattern has much more contrast. They are on wing from September to March, possibly in multiple generations per year.

== Etymology ==
The species name is derived from Greek di (meaning two) and morphe (meaning form) and refers to the distinctive sexual dimorphism of this species.
