= Apophatus bifibratus =

Scientific classification
- Domain: Eukaryota
- Kingdom: Animalia
- Phylum: Arthropoda
- Class: Insecta
- Order: Lepidoptera
- Family: Palaephatidae
- Genus: Apophatus
- Species: A. bifibratus

Binomial name
- Apophatus bifibratus Davis, 1986

Moth species in family Palaephatidae

Apophatus bifibratus is a moth of the family Palaephatidae. It was described by Donald R. Davis in 1986. It is found in the temperate Valdivian forests of southern Argentina and Chile.

The length of the forewings is 5–5.2 mm for males and 5.3–5.5 mm for females. Adults have dark fuscous to light brown forewings reflecting a slight purplish to golden luster, variably marked with streaks and small patches of pale cream to white scales. They are on wing in December in one generation per year.

== Etymology ==
The specific name is derived from Latin bi (meaning two or double) and fibra (meaning filament) and refers to the two filamentous appendages arising from the aedeagus.
