= Metaphatus sinuatus =

Scientific classification
- Kingdom: Animalia
- Phylum: Arthropoda
- Class: Insecta
- Order: Lepidoptera
- Family: Palaephatidae
- Genus: Metaphatus
- Species: M. sinuatus

Binomial name
- Metaphatus sinuatus Davis, 1986

Moth species in family Palaephatidae

Metaphatus sinuatus is a moth of the family Palaephatidae. It was described by Donald R. Davis in 1986. It is known from one location in central Chile.

The length of the forewings is about 7 mm. Adults have light brown forewings. They are on wing in November, probably in one generation per year.

== Etymology ==
The specific name is derived from Latin sinuatus (meaning bend or curve) and refers to the sinuate apex of the lateral anellar arms in the male.
