= Palaephatus spinosus =

Scientific classification
- Kingdom: Animalia
- Phylum: Arthropoda
- Class: Insecta
- Order: Lepidoptera
- Family: Palaephatidae
- Genus: Palaephatus
- Species: P. spinosus

Binomial name
- Palaephatus spinosus Davis, 1986

Moth species in family Palaephatidae

Palaephatus spinosus is a moth of the family Palaephatidae. It is found in forests in the Osorno Province of southern Chile.

The length of the forewings is 5–6 mm. Adults have dark fuscous forewings marked by scattered, pale yellowish white scales concentrated mainly over the middle third. They are on wing in February in one generation per year.

== Etymology ==
The specific name is derived from Latin spinosus (meaning thorny) and refers to the irregular, spinose processes of the gnathos.
