= Palaephatus albicerus =

Scientific classification
- Kingdom: Animalia
- Phylum: Arthropoda
- Class: Insecta
- Order: Lepidoptera
- Family: Palaephatidae
- Genus: Palaephatus
- Species: P. albicerus

Binomial name
- Palaephatus albicerus Davis, 1986

Moth species in family Palaephatidae

Palaephatus albicerus is a moth of the family Palaephatidae. It was described by Davis in 1986. It is found in Chile, from the southern limits of the Coquimbo Desert in the Choapa Province, south through the coastal ranges to Valdivia and Petrohue.

The length of the forewings is 8.5–10 mm for males and 10–11 mm for females. Adult males have white and females yellowish white forewings. The forewings are lightly suffused with gray over the distal half of the wing and have a faint, pale fuscous oblique fascia across the middle of the wing. They are on wing from September to March, possibly in multiple generations per year.

== Etymology ==
The specific name is derived from Latin albicerus (meaning yellowish white) and refers to the forewing ground color, especially of the female.
