= Palaephatus latus =

Scientific classification
- Kingdom: Animalia
- Phylum: Arthropoda
- Class: Insecta
- Order: Lepidoptera
- Family: Palaephatidae
- Genus: Palaephatus
- Species: P. latus

Binomial name
- Palaephatus latus Davis, 1986

Moth species in family Palaephatidae

Palaephatus latus is a moth of the family Palaephatidae. It is found in the Arauco Province of Chile.

The length of the forewings is 4.8–5 mm. Adults are on wing in October in one generation per year.
