= Palaephatus nielseni =

Scientific classification
- Domain: Eukaryota
- Kingdom: Animalia
- Phylum: Arthropoda
- Class: Insecta
- Order: Lepidoptera
- Family: Palaephatidae
- Genus: Palaephatus
- Species: P. nielseni

Binomial name
- Palaephatus nielseni Davis, 1986

Moth species in family Palaephatidae

Palaephatus nielseni is a moth of the family Palaephatidae. It is found in the wetter areas of the Valdivian forest region of southern Argentina and Chile.

The length of the forewings is 5.2–7 mm for males and 6–7 mm for females. Adults have lustrous, light bronzy forewings, irregularly marked with various shades of brown, fuscous and white. They are on wing from October to November, in one generation per year.

== Etymology ==
This species is named in honor of Dr. E.S. Nielsen, in recognition of the extensive fieldwork on this and other families of primitive Lepidoptera that he has conducted in austral South America.
