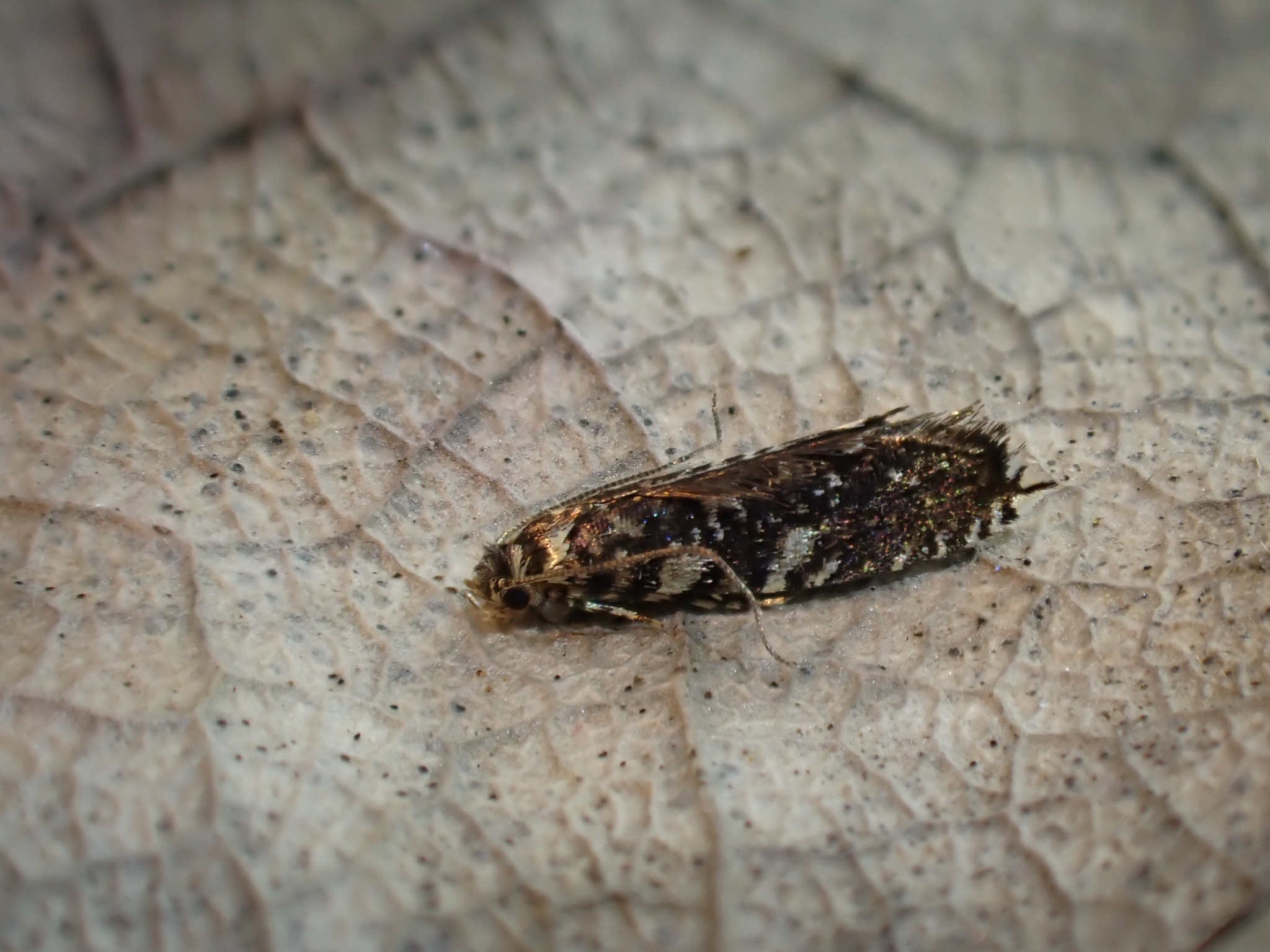

Scientific classification
- Kingdom: Animalia
- Phylum: Arthropoda
- Class: Insecta
- Order: Lepidoptera
- Family: Tineidae
- Genus: Tinea
- Species: T. sphenocosma

Binomial name
- Tinea sphenocosma Meyrick, 1919

= Tinea sphenocosma =

Species of moth endemic to New Zealand

Tinea sphenocosma is a species of moth in the family Tineidae first described by Edward Meyrick in 1919. However the placement of this species within the genus Tinea is in doubt. As a result, this species may be referred to as Tinea (s.l.) sphenocosma. This species is endemic to New Zealand.
