= Sesommata leuroptera =

Scientific classification
- Kingdom: Animalia
- Phylum: Arthropoda
- Class: Insecta
- Order: Lepidoptera
- Family: Palaephatidae
- Genus: Sesommata
- Species: S. leuroptera

Binomial name
- Sesommata leuroptera Davis, 1986

Moth species in family Palaephatidae

Sesommata leuroptera is a moth of the family Palaephatidae. It was described by Donald R. Davis in 1986. It is found in the southern temperate forests of Argentina and Chile.

The length of the forewings is 5–7 mm for males and 6.5–7 mm for females. Adult males have smooth, brownish fuscous to black forewings, sometimes with a few scattered white scales. The forewings of the females are usually light in colour, with white scales along the costa and scattered over the distal half. Adults are on wing from November to March, probably in one generation per year.

== Etymology ==
The species name is derived from Greek leuros (meaning smooth or level) and pteron (meaning feather or wing) and refers to the smooth scale vestiture over the entire forewing of the male.
