= Palaephatus falsus =

Scientific classification
- Domain: Eukaryota
- Kingdom: Animalia
- Phylum: Arthropoda
- Class: Insecta
- Order: Lepidoptera
- Family: Palaephatidae
- Genus: Palaephatus
- Species: P. falsus

Binomial name
- Palaephatus falsus Butler, 1883

Moth species in family Palaephatidae

Palaephatus falsus is a moth of the family Palaephatidae. It was described by Arthur Gardiner Butler in 1883. It is found in the Valdivian forest region of southern Chile from the Nahuelbuta Mountains south to Chiloé Island. In southern Argentina it is found from the adjacent Andean forests of the Neuquén Province south to the Interoceanic Magellanic region of southern Tierra del Fuego.

The length of the forewings is 8.5–12 mm for males and 11–13 mm for females. Adults have light buff to light fuscous forewings variably marked with darker brown specks and oblique lines in males. Females are much paler and have whitish hindwings. They are on wing from September to March, possibly in multiple generations per year.
