= Palaephatus amplisaccus =

Scientific classification
- Domain: Eukaryota
- Kingdom: Animalia
- Phylum: Arthropoda
- Class: Insecta
- Order: Lepidoptera
- Family: Palaephatidae
- Genus: Palaephatus
- Species: P. amplisaccus

Binomial name
- Palaephatus amplisaccus Davis, 1986

Moth species in family Palaephatidae

Palaephatus amplisaccus is a moth of the family Palaephatidae. It is found in the Valdivian forests of the lake region in southern Argentina and Chile.

The length of the forewings is 6–8 mm for males and 7-7.5 mm for females. Adults have light brown forewings variably marked with white and dark brown streaks. There is a relatively prominent dark brown spot found at the middle of the costa. They are on wing from November to February, probably in one generation per year.

== Etymology ==
The specific name is derived from Latin amplus (meaning large) and saccus (meaning sack or bag) and refers to the enlarged vinculum-saccus of the male.
