= Sesommata albimaculata =

Scientific classification
- Kingdom: Animalia
- Phylum: Arthropoda
- Class: Insecta
- Order: Lepidoptera
- Family: Palaephatidae
- Genus: Sesommata
- Species: S. albimaculata

Binomial name
- Sesommata albimaculata Davis, 1986

Moth species in family Palaephatidae

Sesommata albimaculata is a moth of the family Palaephatidae. It was described by Donald R. Davis in 1986. It is found in the Parque Nacional Lanín in Argentina.

The length of the forewings is 5.5–6 mm. Adults have dark fuscous to black wings with 5-6 yellowish white, equally spaced spots of similar size on the forewings. Adults are on wing December in one generation per year.

== Etymology ==
The species name is derived from Latin albus (meaning white) and maculatus (meaning spotted or speckled) and refers to the spotted forewing pattern.
