= Palaephatus fusciterminus =

Scientific classification
- Domain: Eukaryota
- Kingdom: Animalia
- Phylum: Arthropoda
- Class: Insecta
- Order: Lepidoptera
- Family: Palaephatidae
- Genus: Palaephatus
- Species: P. fusciterminus

Binomial name
- Palaephatus fusciterminus Davis, 1986

Moth species in family Palaephatidae

Palaephatus fusciterminus is a moth of the family Palaephatidae. It is found in the Valdivian forests of southern Argentina and Chile.

The length of the forewings is 10–12 mm for males and 10.5–11.5 mm for females. They are on wing from October to March, possibly in multiple generations per year.
