= Palaephatus luteolus =

Scientific classification
- Domain: Eukaryota
- Kingdom: Animalia
- Phylum: Arthropoda
- Class: Insecta
- Order: Lepidoptera
- Family: Palaephatidae
- Genus: Palaephatus
- Species: P. luteolus

Binomial name
- Palaephatus luteolus Davis, 1986

Moth species in family Palaephatidae

Palaephatus luteolus is a moth of the family Palaephatidae. It was described by Donald R. Davis in 1986. It is found in the Valdivian forest region of southern Chile and Argentina, from the Cautin Province and the Neuquen Province south to the Interoceanic Magellanic region of Tierra del Fuego.

The length of the forewings is 12–14.5 mm for males and 14–16 mm for females. Adults have pale to bright yellow forewings usually marked with variable spots and oblique bands of brownish fuscous. They are on wing from October to March, possibly in multiple generations per year.

== Etymology ==
The specific name is derived from Latin luteolus (meaning yellowish) and refers to the predominantly yellowish color of the forewings.
