= Metaphatus adustus =

Scientific classification
- Kingdom: Animalia
- Phylum: Arthropoda
- Class: Insecta
- Order: Lepidoptera
- Family: Palaephatidae
- Genus: Metaphatus
- Species: M. adustus

Binomial name
- Metaphatus adustus Davis, 1986

Moth species in family Palaephatidae

Metaphatus adustus is a moth of the family Palaephatidae. It was described by Donald R. Davis in 1986. It is found in the temperate forests and outlying areas of southern montane Argentina and south-central Chile.

The length of the forewings is 7.5–9.5 mm for males and 9–11 mm for females. Adults have medium to dark brown forewings with typically two small, dark brown discal spots. They are on wing from September to March, probably in multiple generations per year.

== Etymology ==
The specific name is derived from Latin adustus (meaning brown or tanned) and refers to the uniformly brown forewings of this species.
