= Metaphatus spatulatus =

Scientific classification
- Kingdom: Animalia
- Phylum: Arthropoda
- Class: Insecta
- Order: Lepidoptera
- Family: Palaephatidae
- Genus: Metaphatus
- Species: M. spatulatus

Binomial name
- Metaphatus spatulatus Davis, 1986

Moth species in family Palaephatidae

Metaphatus spatulatus is a moth of the family Palaephatidae. It was described by Donald R. Davis in 1986. It is found in the temperate forests of the lake region of Argentina.

The length of the forewings is 8–10 mm for males and 9–10.5 mm for females. Adults have light to medium brown forewings, faintly marked with dark brown and a few scattered white scales. They are on wing from October to January in one generation per year.

== Etymology ==
The specific name is derived from Latin spatula (meaning a broad, flat stirring tool) and refers to the spatulate form of the lateral anellar arms of the male genitalia.
