= Sesommata paraplatysaris =

Scientific classification
- Kingdom: Animalia
- Phylum: Arthropoda
- Class: Insecta
- Order: Lepidoptera
- Family: Palaephatidae
- Genus: Sesommata
- Species: S. paraplatysaris

Binomial name
- Sesommata paraplatysaris Davis, 1986

Moth species in family Palaephatidae

Sesommata paraplatysaris is a moth of the family Palaephatidae. It was described by Donald R. Davis in 1986. It is found in the montane, temperate forests of southern Argentina and Chile.
