= Palaephatus albiterminus =

Scientific classification
- Kingdom: Animalia
- Phylum: Arthropoda
- Class: Insecta
- Order: Lepidoptera
- Family: Palaephatidae
- Genus: Palaephatus
- Species: P. albiterminus

Binomial name
- Palaephatus albiterminus Davis, 1986

Moth species in family Palaephatidae

Palaephatus albiterminus is a moth of the family Palaephatidae. It was described by Donald R. Davis in 1986. It is found in the wetter areas of the temperate, Valdivian forests of southern Argentina and Chile.

The length of the forewings is 6.8–10 mm for males and 9–10 mm for females. They are on wing from September to February, possibly in multiple generations per year.

== Etymology ==
The specific name is derived from Latin albus (meaning white) and terminus (meaning end or limit) and refers to the narrow white band on the termen.
