= Palaephatus striatus =

Scientific classification
- Domain: Eukaryota
- Kingdom: Animalia
- Phylum: Arthropoda
- Class: Insecta
- Order: Lepidoptera
- Family: Palaephatidae
- Genus: Palaephatus
- Species: P. striatus

Binomial name
- Palaephatus striatus Davis, 1986

Moth species in family Palaephatidae

Palaephatus striatus is a moth of the family Palaephatidae. It is found in the wetter Valdivian forests of central Argentina and Chile from Lago Puyehue and Lago Nahuel Huapi south to Chiloe Island.

The length of the forewings is 9-11.2 mm for males and 10–11 mm for females.
