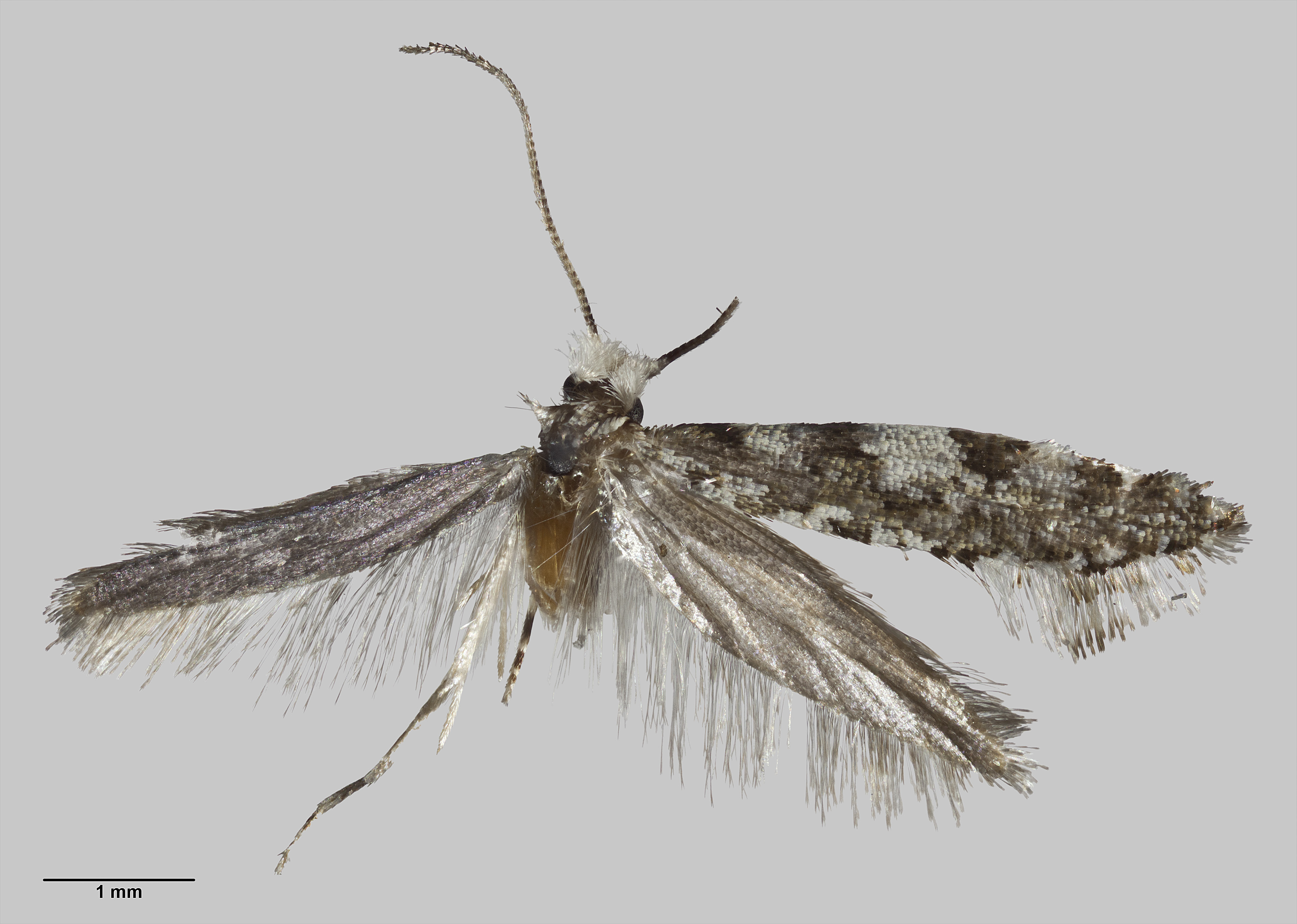
- Male holotype

Scientific classification
- Kingdom: Animalia
- Phylum: Arthropoda
- Class: Insecta
- Order: Lepidoptera
- Family: Tineidae
- Genus: Tinea
- Species: T. furcillata

Binomial name
- Tinea furcillata Philpott, 1930

= Tinea furcillata =

Species of moth endemic to New Zealand

Tinea furcillata is a species of moth in the family Tineidae first described by Alfred Philpott in 1930. However the placement of this species within the genus Tinea is in doubt. As a result, this species may be referred to as Tinea (s.l.) furcillata. This species is endemic to New Zealand.
