= Palaephatus pallidus =

Scientific classification
- Kingdom: Animalia
- Phylum: Arthropoda
- Class: Insecta
- Order: Lepidoptera
- Family: Palaephatidae
- Genus: Palaephatus
- Species: P. pallidus

Binomial name
- Palaephatus pallidus Davis, 1986

Moth species in family Palaephatidae

Palaephatus pallidus is a moth of the family Palaephatidae. It was described by Donald R. Davis in 1986. It is found in the southern temperature forest of Chile and the adjacent Andean frontier of Argentina.

The length of the forewings is 9–12 mm for males and 11–12 mm for females. Adults have pale whitish buff forewings variously mottled by small brownish fuscous spots and a large oblique medial fascia. They are on wing from December to March in one generation per year.

== Etymology ==
The specific name is derived from Latin pallidus (meaning ashen or wan) and refers to the pale ground color of the wings.
