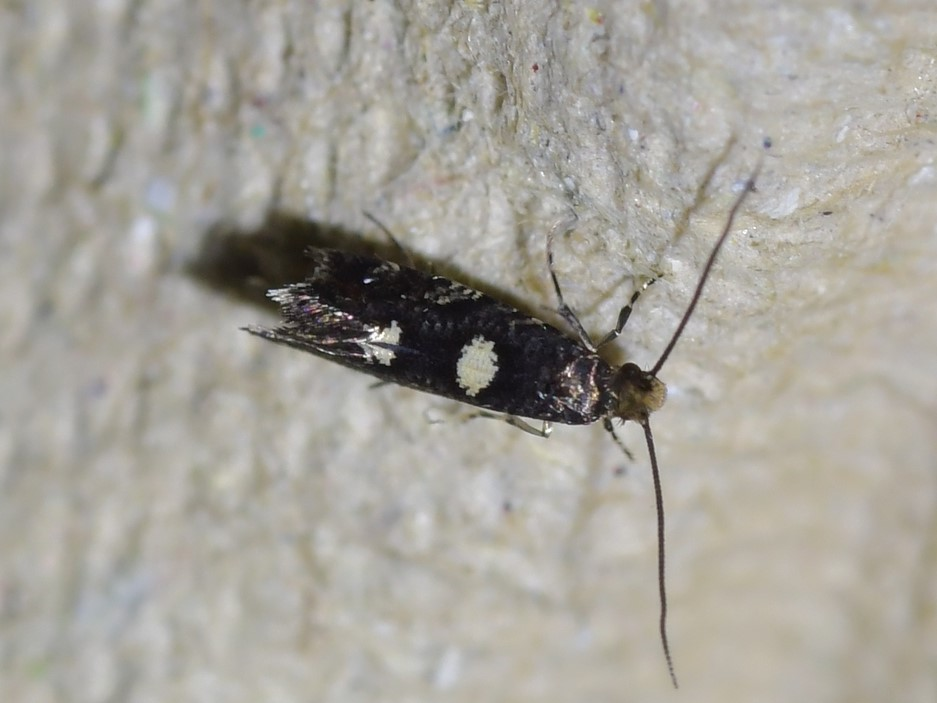

Scientific classification
- Kingdom: Animalia
- Phylum: Arthropoda
- Class: Insecta
- Order: Lepidoptera
- Family: Tineidae
- Genus: Tinea
- Species: T. argodelta

Binomial name
- Tinea argodelta Meyrick, 1915

= Tinea argodelta =

Species of moth

Tinea argodelta is a species of moth in the family Tineidae. It was described by Edward Meyrick in 1915. However the placement of this species within the genus Tinea is in doubt. As a result, this species has been referred to as Tinea (s.l.) argodelta. This species is endemic to New Zealand.

== Description ==
The wingspan is about 10 mm. The forewings are dark purple fuscous with two or three minute whitish strigulae on the costa towards one-third, a spot of white strigulation in the middle of the costa, a smaller spot at two-thirds, and three dots between this and the apex. There is a clear white triangular spot on the dorsum before the middle, reaching nearly half across the wing and a spot of whitish strigulation on the dorsum before the tornus, and two or three whitish scales towards the termen. The hindwings are dark purple-grey.

== Gallery ==
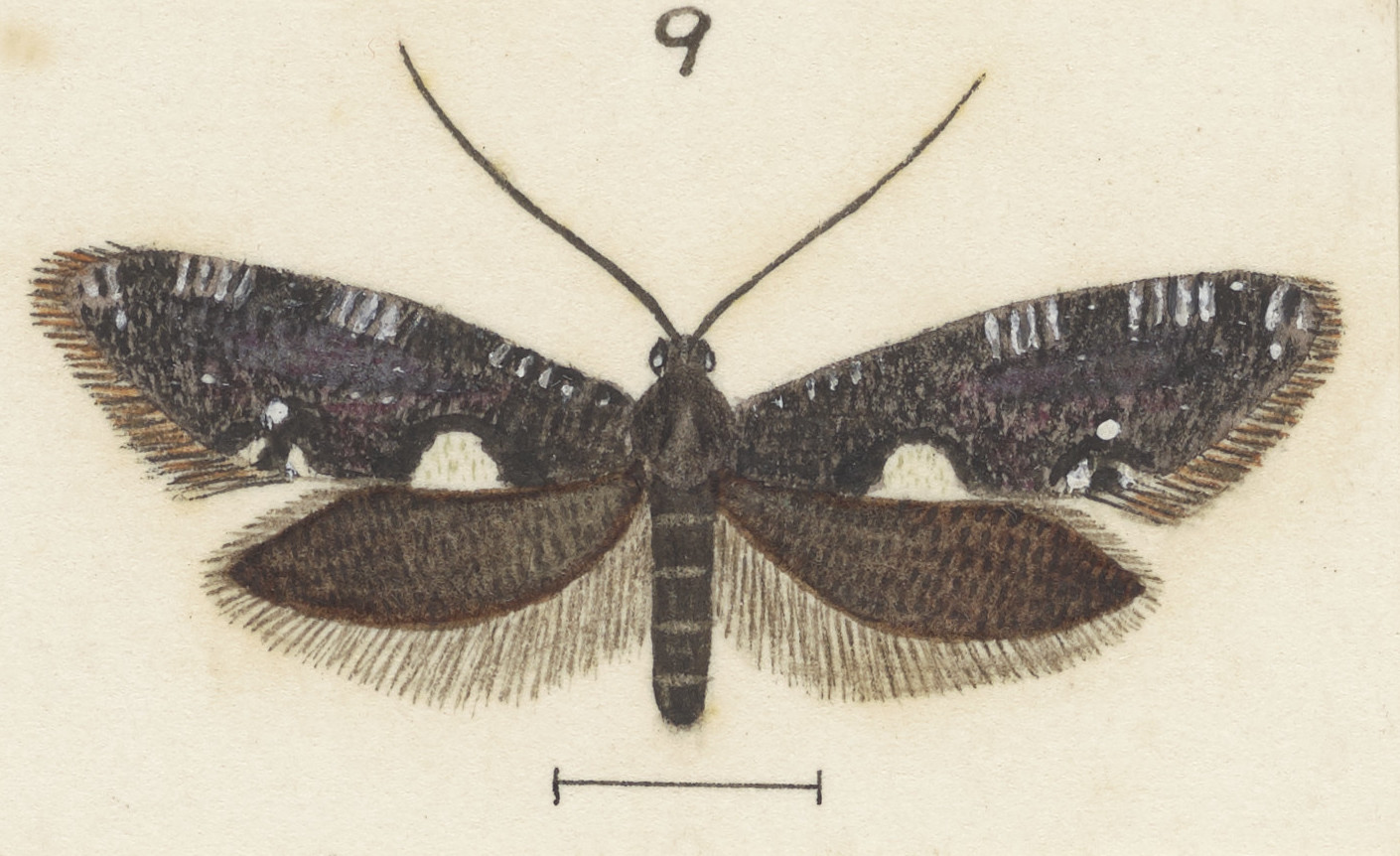
Illustration

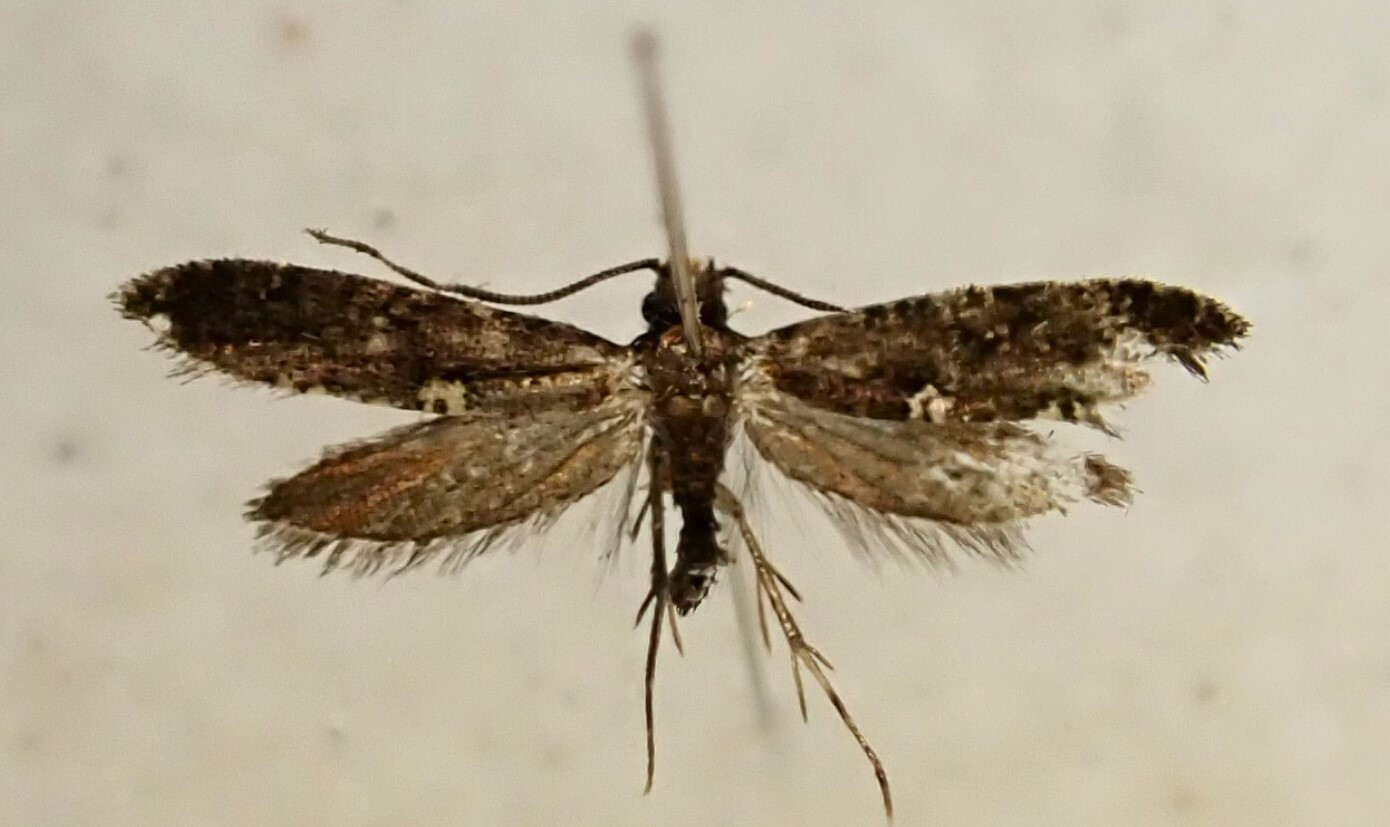
Pinned specimen
