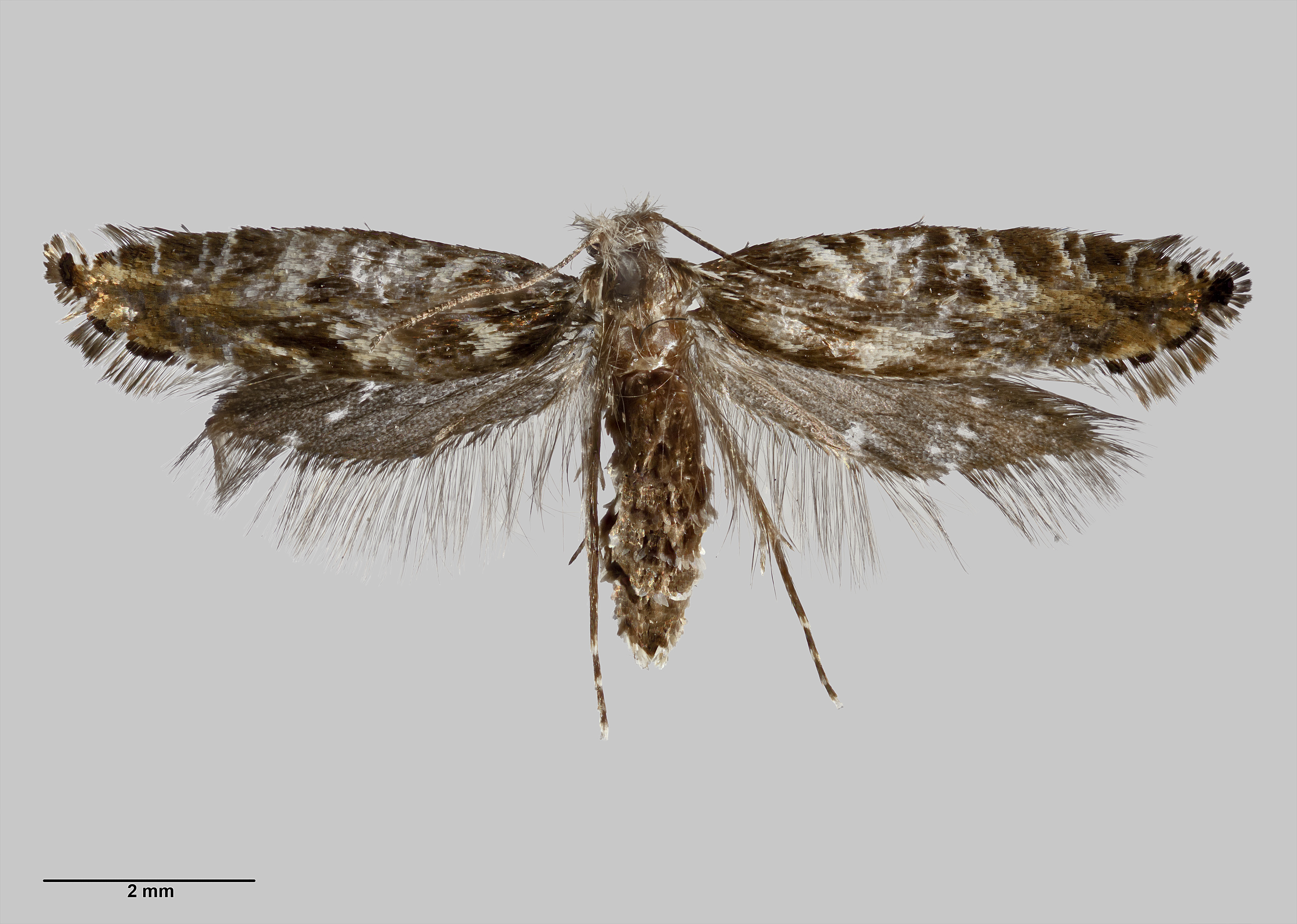
- Female

Scientific classification
- Kingdom: Animalia
- Phylum: Arthropoda
- Class: Insecta
- Order: Lepidoptera
- Family: Tineidae
- Genus: Tinea
- Species: T. astraea

Binomial name
- Tinea astraea Meyrick, 1911

Synonyms
- Tinea aerate Philpott, 1930; Tinea cymodoce Meyrick,1924

= Tinea astraea =

Species of moth

Tinea astraea is a species of moth in the family Tineidae. It was described by Edward Meyrick in 1911. However the placement of this species within the genus Tinea is in doubt. As a result, this species has been referred to as Tinea (s.l.) astraea. This species is endemic to New Zealand.

The wingspan is about 12 mm. The forewings are blackish, the apical two-fifths bronzy fuscous, and with five fine white longitudinal lines from the base in the disc, the second and third reaching to near the middle, the others shorter. There are two very short white marks on the costa near the base and pairs of oblique white streaks from the costa at one-fourth and the middle, reaching half across the wing. There are also pairs of short broken ochreous-whitish streaks from the dorsum at one-fourth and one-half and the posterior area has four or five less-oblique diminishing white streaks from the costa, and three iridescent silvery-whitish from the tornus and termen, nearly meeting in the disc. The hindwings are grey, with purplish reflections.
