= Metaphatus ichnius =

Scientific classification
- Kingdom: Animalia
- Phylum: Arthropoda
- Class: Insecta
- Order: Lepidoptera
- Family: Palaephatidae
- Genus: Metaphatus
- Species: M. ichnius

Binomial name
- Metaphatus ichnius Davis, 1986

Moth species in family Palaephatidae

Metaphatus ichnius is a moth of the family Palaephatidae. It was described by Donald R. Davis in 1986. It is found in the temperate Andean forests of southern Chile, from Malleco Province south to Chiloe Island.

The length of the forewings is 8.5–9 mm for males and 9–9.6 mm for females. Adults have dark brown forewings, irregularly streaked with heavy, sinuate, white to pale buff lines. They are on wing from December to February in one generation per year.

== Etymology ==
The specific name is derived from Greek ichnion (meaning a small track or trail) and refers to the pale, sinuate streak on the forewing.
