= Apophatus parvus =

Scientific classification
- Kingdom: Animalia
- Phylum: Arthropoda
- Class: Insecta
- Order: Lepidoptera
- Family: Palaephatidae
- Genus: Apophatus
- Species: A. parvus

Binomial name
- Apophatus parvus Davis, 1986

Moth species in family Palaephatidae

Apophatus parvus is a moth of the family Palaephatidae. It was described by Donald R. Davis in 1986. It is found in the Valdivian forest zone of southern Chile.

The length of the forewings is about 3.8 mm for males and about 4 mm for females. They are on wing in February in one generation per year.
