= Metaphatus ochraceus =

Scientific classification
- Kingdom: Animalia
- Phylum: Arthropoda
- Class: Insecta
- Order: Lepidoptera
- Family: Palaephatidae
- Genus: Metaphatus
- Species: M. ochraceus

Binomial name
- Metaphatus ochraceus Davis, 1986

Moth species in family Palaephatidae

Metaphatus ochraceus is a moth of the family Palaephatidae. It was described by Donald R. Davis in 1986. It is found from the Talca Province in Chile south to Chiloe Island and Esquel in Argentina.

The length of the forewings is 7.5–9.5 mm for males and 8–10.5 mm for females. Adults have a pale yellow body and forewings. Occasionally, there is an indistinct pattern of light brown to fuscous scales on the forewings, especially in males. They are on wing from August to March, possibly in multiple generations per year.

== Etymology ==
The specific name is derived from Greek ochros (meaning pale yellow) and refers to the predominantly pale yellow color of this species.
