= Sesommata trachyptera =

Scientific classification
- Kingdom: Animalia
- Phylum: Arthropoda
- Class: Insecta
- Order: Lepidoptera
- Family: Palaephatidae
- Genus: Sesommata
- Species: S. trachyptera

Binomial name
- Sesommata trachyptera Davis, 1986

Moth species in family Palaephatidae

Sesommata trachyptera is a moth of the family Palaephatidae, found in the Valdivian forest region. It was described by Donald R. Davis in 1986.

Adults are on wing from November to March, probably univoltine.
