= Palaephatus leucacrotus =

Scientific classification
- Kingdom: Animalia
- Phylum: Arthropoda
- Class: Insecta
- Order: Lepidoptera
- Family: Palaephatidae
- Genus: Palaephatus
- Species: P. leucacrotus

Binomial name
- Palaephatus leucacrotus Davis, 1986

Moth species in family Palaephatidae

Palaephatus leucacrotus is a moth of the family Palaephatidae. It is found in the wetter areas of the Valdivian forest region of south-central Chile.

The length of the forewings is 6–7 mm for males and 6.5–7 mm for females. They are on wing from October to December in one generation per year.
