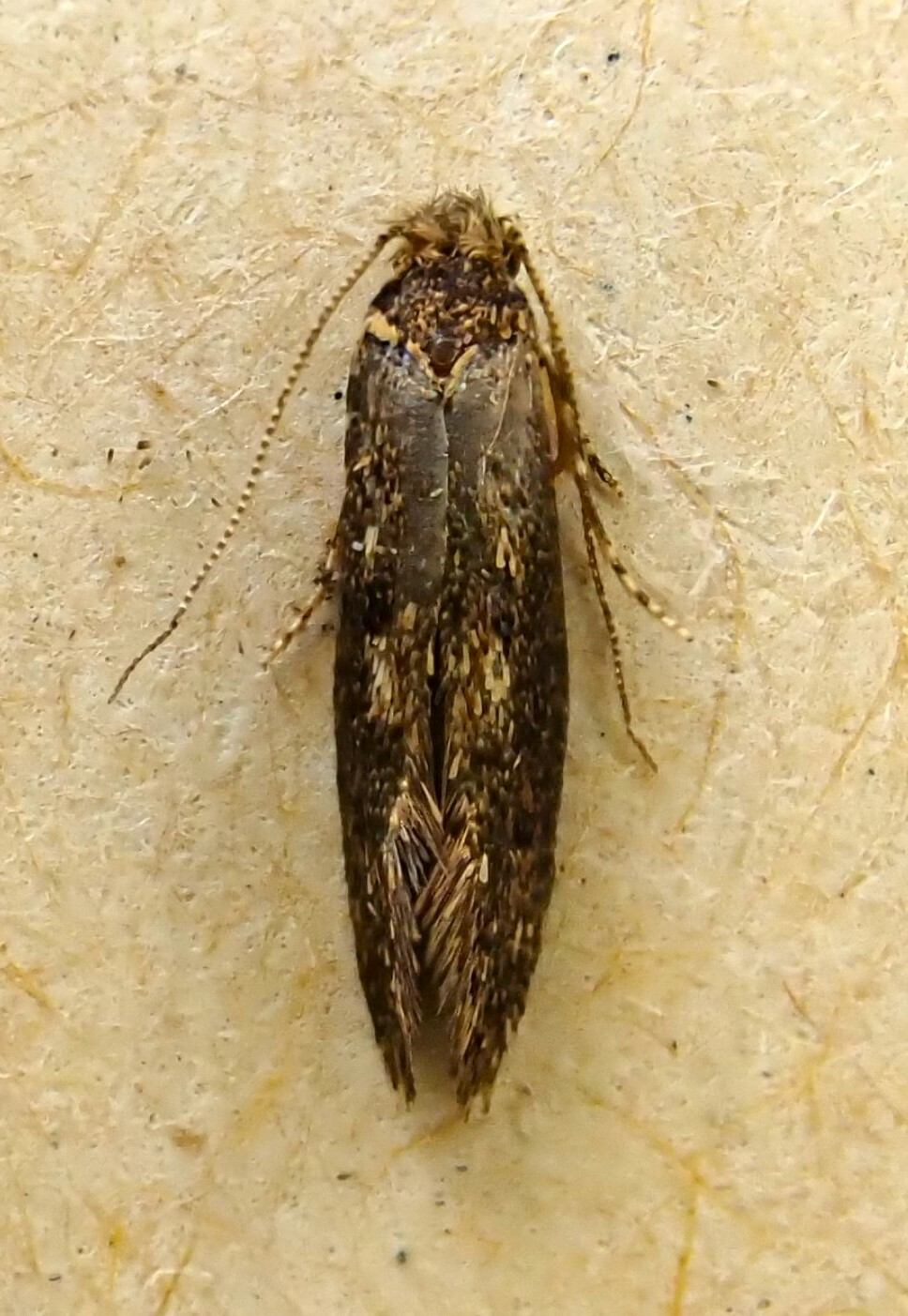

Scientific classification
- Kingdom: Animalia
- Phylum: Arthropoda
- Class: Insecta
- Order: Lepidoptera
- Family: Tineidae
- Genus: Tinea
- Species: T. conferta

Binomial name
- Tinea conferta Meyrick, 1914

= Tinea conferta =

Species of moth

Tinea conferta is a species of moth in the family Tineidae. It was described by Edward Meyrick in 1914. However the placement of this species within the genus Tinea is in doubt. As a result, this species has been referred to as Tinea (s.l.) conferta.

== Distribution ==
This species is endemic to New Zealand.

== Description ==
This species has a pair of yellow marks near the dorsum with dark patches between these.

== Gallery ==
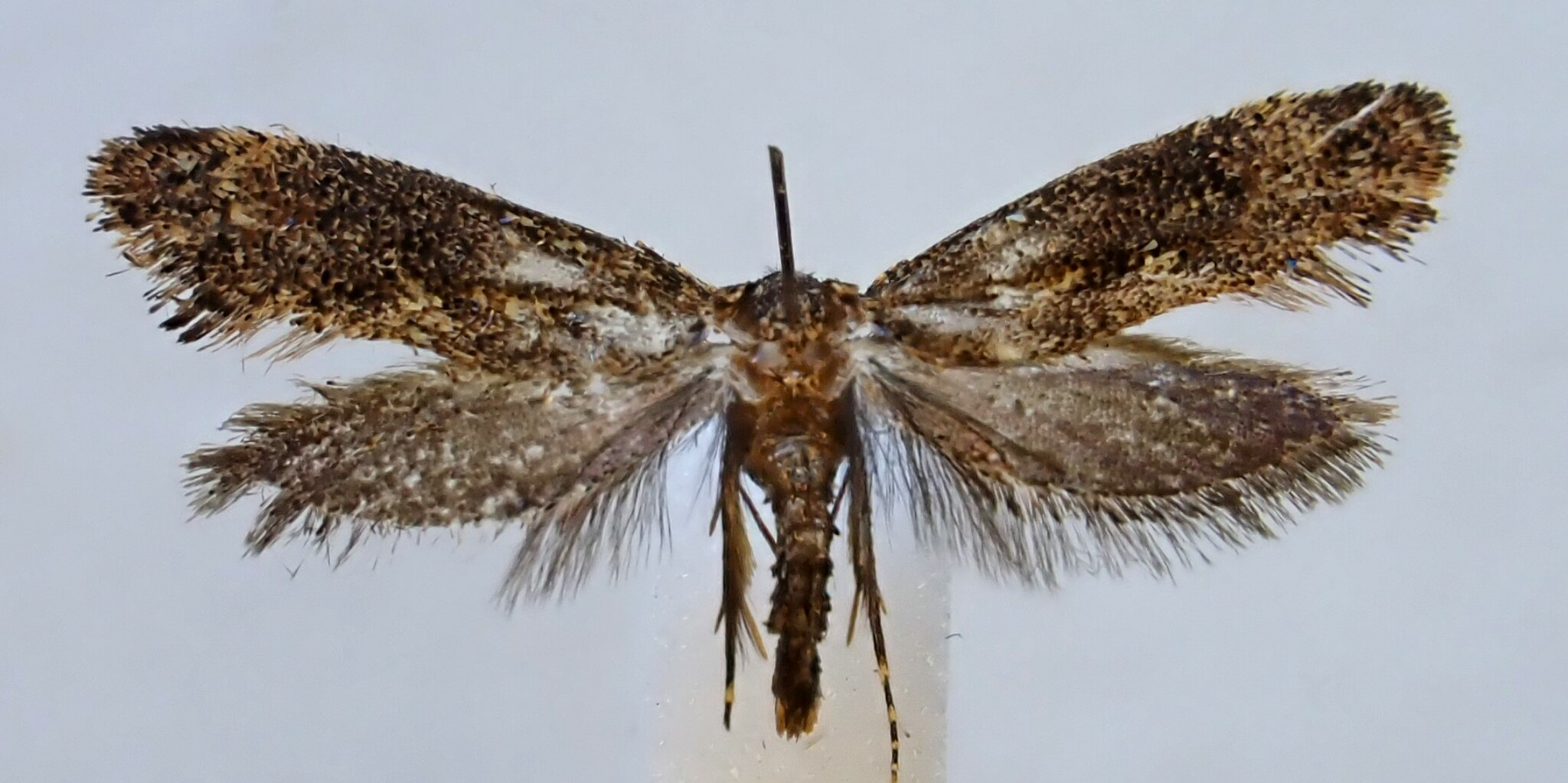
Pinned Tinea conferta collected from the Coromandel Peninsula

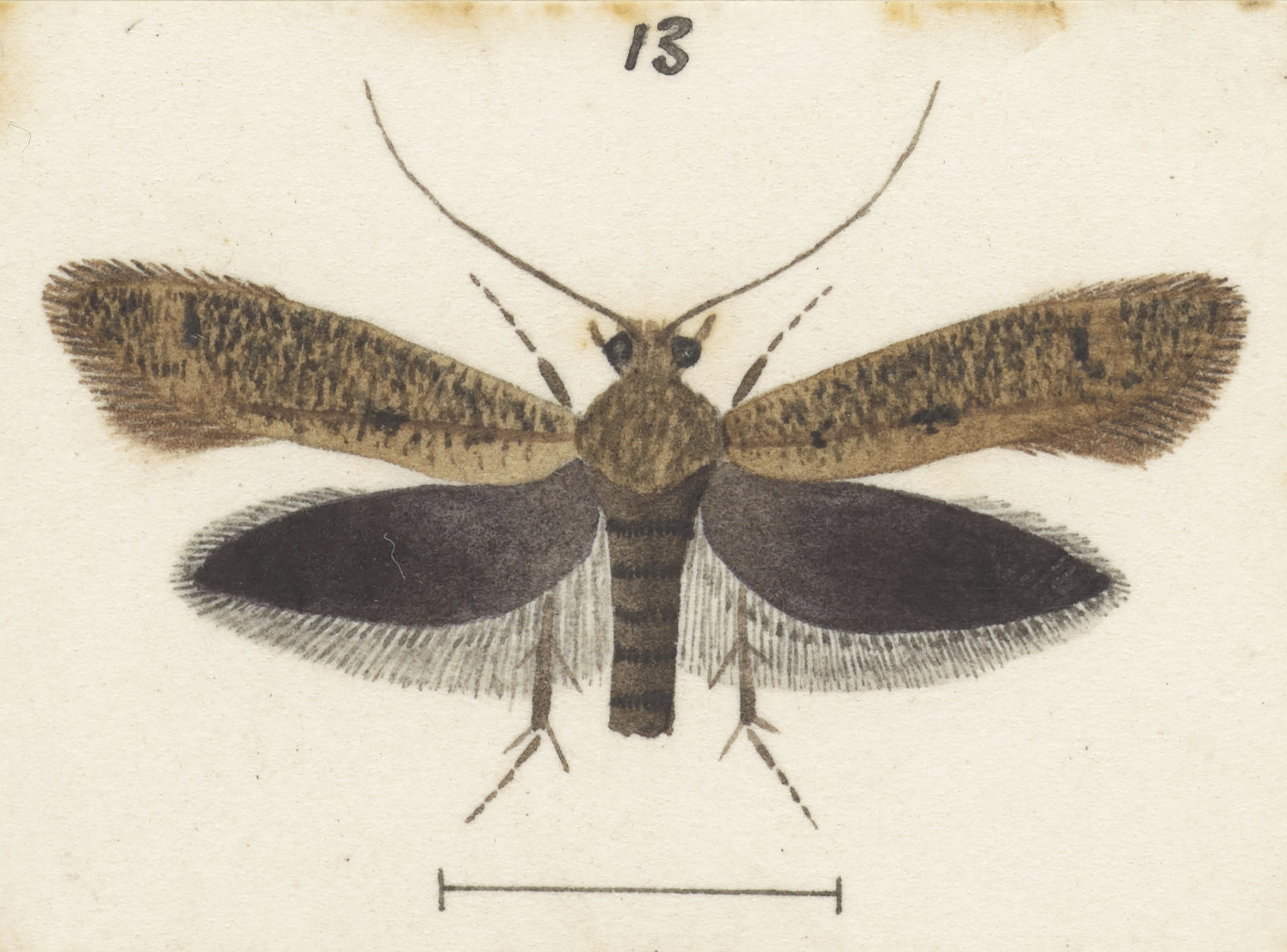
Illustration of male
