= Metaphatus =

Scientific classification
- Kingdom: Animalia
- Phylum: Arthropoda
- Class: Insecta
- Order: Lepidoptera
- Family: Palaephatidae
- Genus: Metaphatus; Davis, 1986

Moth genus in family Palaephatidae

Metaphatus is a genus of moths in the family Palaephatidae. It was described by Donald R. Davis in 1986.

== Species ==
- Metaphatus spatulatus Davis, 1986
- Metaphatus ochraceus Davis, 1986
- Metaphatus ichnius Davis, 1986
- Metaphatus cirrhus Davis, 1986
- Metaphatus sinuatus Davis, 1986
- Metaphatus adustus Davis, 1986
