= Sesommata platysaris =

Scientific classification
- Kingdom: Animalia
- Phylum: Arthropoda
- Class: Insecta
- Order: Lepidoptera
- Family: Palaephatidae
- Genus: Sesommata
- Species: S. platysaris

Binomial name
- Sesommata platysaris (Meyrick, 1931)

Synonyms
- Tinea platysaris Meyrick, 1931

Moth species in family Palaephatidae

Sesommata platysaris is a moth of the family Palaephatidae. It was described by Edward Meyrick in 1931. It is found in the lake region in Argentina, including Lácar Lake and especially Nahuel Huapi Lake.

The length of the forewings is 4.8-6.2 mm for males and 5.4-5.6 mm for females. Adult males have dark fuscous to black wings, with a relatively large, rounded mass of broad sex scales. The forewings of the females are smooth and sometimes have a few scattered white scales. Adults are on wing from November to January in one generation per year.
