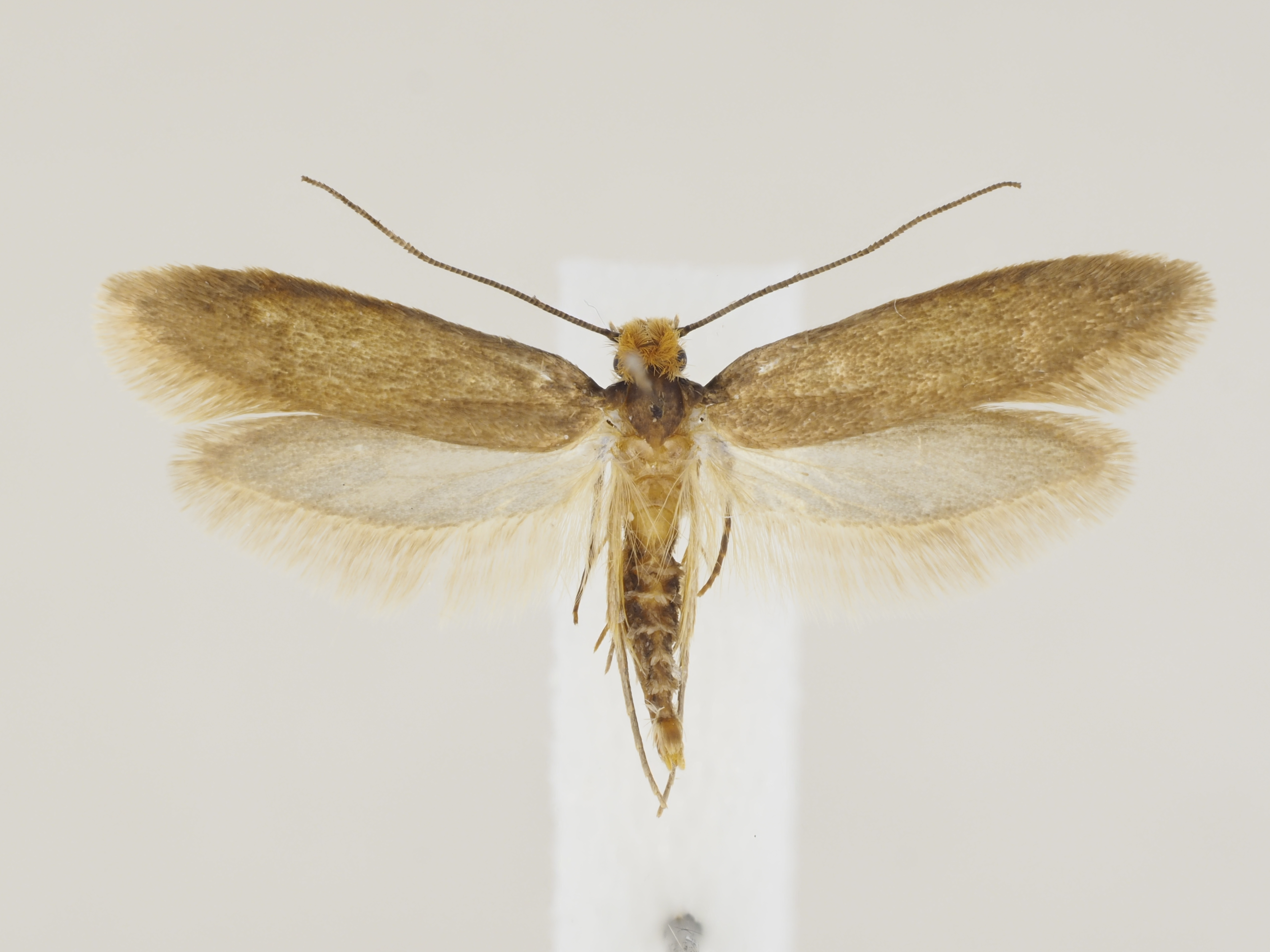

Scientific classification
- Kingdom: Animalia
- Phylum: Arthropoda
- Class: Insecta
- Order: Lepidoptera
- Family: Tineidae
- Genus: Tinea
- Species: T. bothniella

Binomial name
- Tinea bothniella Svensson, 1953

= Tinea bothniella =

Species of moth

Tinea bothniella is a moth belonging to the family Tineidae. The species was first described by Svensson in 1953.

It is native to Northern Europe.
