= Tinea flavescentella =

Scientific classification
- Kingdom: Animalia
- Phylum: Arthropoda
- Clade: Pancrustacea
- Class: Insecta
- Order: Lepidoptera
- Family: Tineidae
- Genus: Tinea
- Species: T. flavescentella

Binomial name
- Tinea flavescentella Haworth, 1828

Species of moth

Tinea flavescentella is a species of moth belonging to the family Tineidae. It is native to Western Europe. The wingspan is 8–17 mm. Head with pale yellow hair tuts. Antennae just over half the front wing length. The forewings are greyish yellow with two or three grey-brown spots and a faint hyaline spot at the base. Hindwings grey. Certain identification requires examination of the genitalia.

Flies at night in August. It is found indoors where fur and wool goods are kept.
