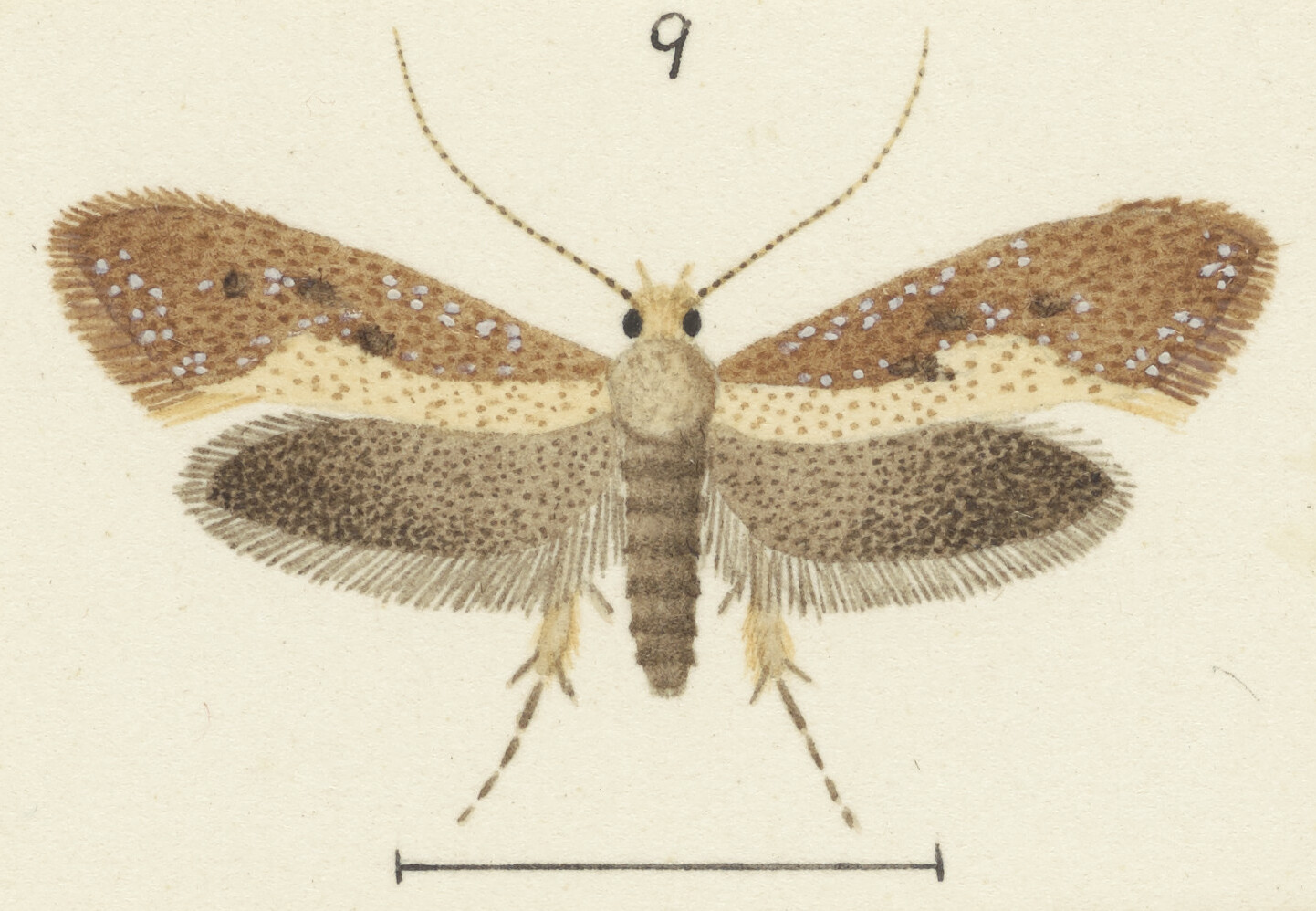
- Illustration of male

Scientific classification
- Kingdom: Animalia
- Phylum: Arthropoda
- Clade: Pancrustacea
- Class: Insecta
- Order: Lepidoptera
- Family: Tineidae
- Genus: Tinea
- Species: T. dividua

Binomial name
- Tinea dividua Philpott, 1928

= Tinea dividua =

Species of moth

Tinea dividua is a species of moth in the family Tineidae. It was described by Alfred Philpott in 1928. However the placement of this species within the genus Tinea is in doubt. As a result, this species has been referred to as Tinea (s.l.) dividua. This species is endemic to New Zealand.
