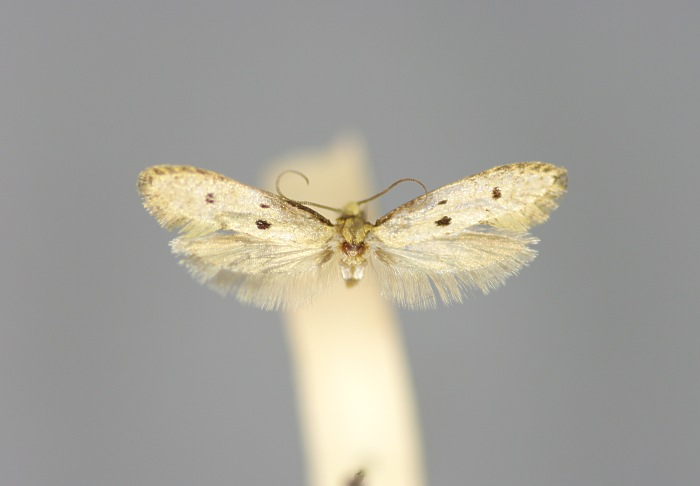

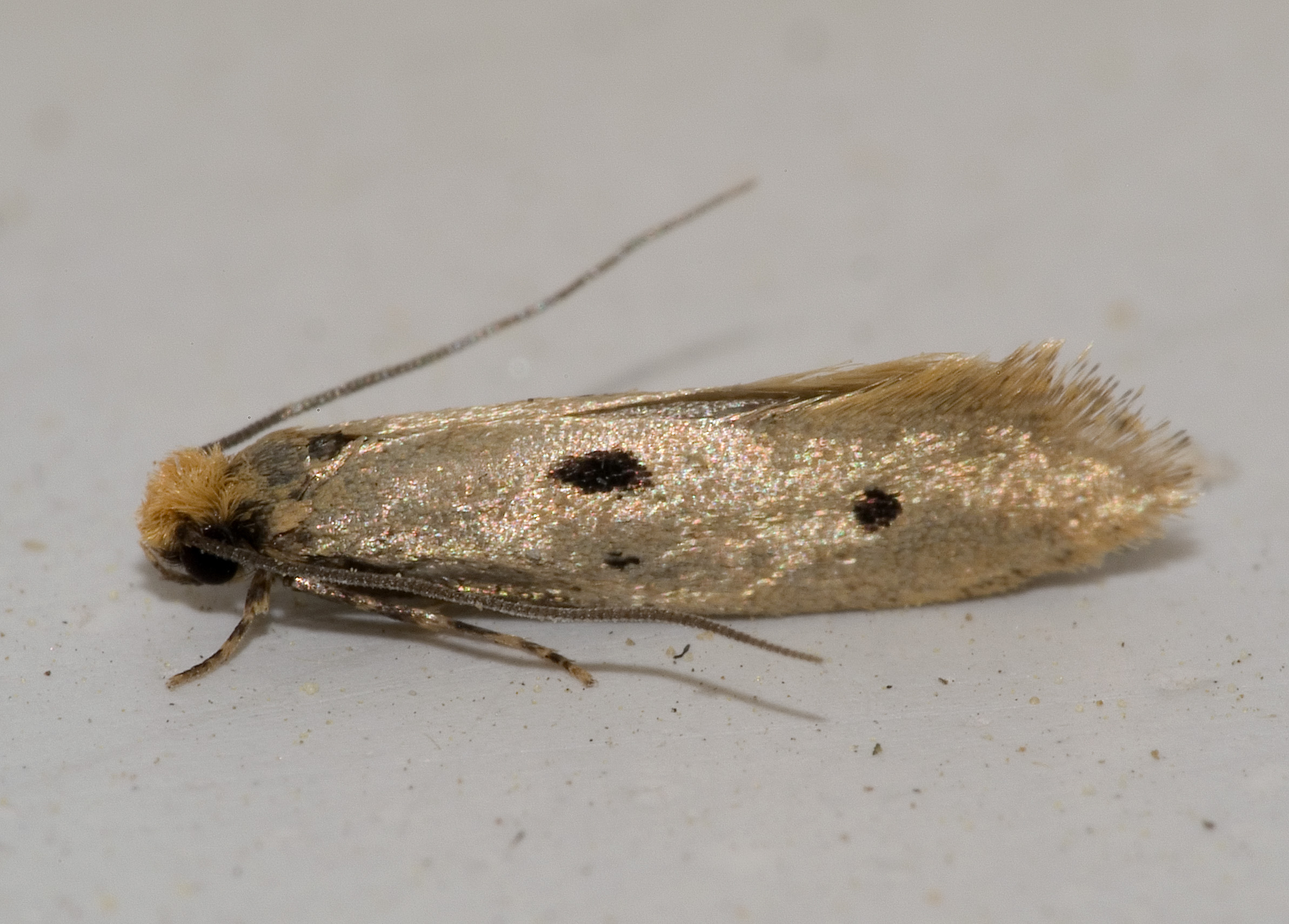
- Adult in Graz, Austria

Scientific classification
- Kingdom: Animalia
- Phylum: Arthropoda
- Clade: Pancrustacea
- Class: Insecta
- Order: Lepidoptera
- Family: Tineidae
- Genus: Tinea
- Species: T. trinotella

Binomial name
- Tinea trinotella Thunberg, 1794

Synonyms
- Numerous, see text

= Tinea trinotella =

Species of moth

Tinea trinotella is a species of tineoid moth. It belongs to the fungus moth family (Tineidae), and therein to the nominate subfamily Tineinae. It was once used as type species of a distinct genus Acedes, but this is synonymized today with Tinea, the type genus of Tineinae, Tineidae and the superfamily Tineoidea.

== Ecology and description ==
It is widespread and common in much of the western Palearctic; no records exist from Slovenia but as it is found in the surrounding countries, it may well have simply not been noticed yet. Its absence from Iceland seems to be genuine however. The nocturnal adults are on the wing about May to August, depending on the location, and are easily attracted to light sources. Two generations may occur each year at least in part of its range.

This small moth has a wingspan of 12–18 mm when adult. Their forewings are a plain greyish buff with a golden hue, and bear the one large, one medium and one small clear-cut black dots referenced in the specific name trinotella. On the head, they have a tuft of yellow or orange hairs.

The caterpillars live in small portable cases they build from debris held together with their own silk, just like those of the case-bearing clothes moth (T. pellionella) and other relatives. They typically inhabit bird nests – e.g. of chicken (Gallus gallus domesticus), domestic pigeon (Columba livia domestica), linnet (Carduelis cannabina) or common chaffinch (Fringilla coelebs) – where they feed on food remains and similar organic detritus. They have also been found on discarded woolen fabrics.

== Synonyms ==
When Acedes was established by Jacob Hübner in or around 1825, the present species was placed there under the name A. lappella, often misspelled lapella. This was because many authors at that time, including Hübner, believed that the taxon Tinea lappella referred to the present species. Indeed, it was Hübner himself, who in 1796 first made this misidentification in his major work Sammlung Europäischer Schmetterlinge. But actually, T. lappella – described by Carl Linnaeus in 1758 as Phalaena (Tinea) lappella – is a twirler moth (family Gelechiidae), namely the burdock seedhead moth, called Metzneria lappella today. Similarly, the name T. tripunctella was erroneously applied to T. trinotella for some time, but as originally established by Michael Denis and Ignaz Schiffermüller in 1775 it refers to another twirler moth which is nowadays known as Acompsia tripunctella.

Obsolete scientific names (junior synonyms and others) of Tinea trinotella are:

- Acedes lapella (lapsus)
- Acedes lappella (auct. non Linnaeus, 1758: misidentification)
- Phalaena (Tinea) lapella (lapsus)
- Phalaena (Tinea) lappella (auct. non Linnaeus, 1758: misidentification)
- Tinea ganomella Treitschke, 1833
- Tinea lapella (lapsus)
- Tinea lappella (auct. non Linnaeus, 1758: misidentification)
- Tinea tripunctella (auct. non Denis & Schiffermüller 1775: misidentification)
