= Palaephatus (moth) =

Scientific classification
- Domain: Eukaryota
- Kingdom: Animalia
- Phylum: Arthropoda
- Class: Insecta
- Order: Lepidoptera
- Family: Palaephatidae
- Genus: Palaephatus; Butler, 1883

Moth genus in family Palaephatidae

Palaephatus is a genus of moths in the family Palaephatidae.

== Species ==
- Subgenus Prophatus Davis, 1986
  - Palaephatus albicerus
  - Palaephatus amplisaccus
  - Palaephatus dimorphus
  - Palaephatus fusciterminus
  - Palaephatus latus
  - Palaephatus leucacrotus
  - Palaephatus nielseni
  - Palaephatus spinosus
  - Palaephatus striatus
- Subgenus Palaephatus
  - Palaephatus albiterminus
  - Palaephatus falsus
  - Palaephatus luteolus
  - Palaephatus pallidus
