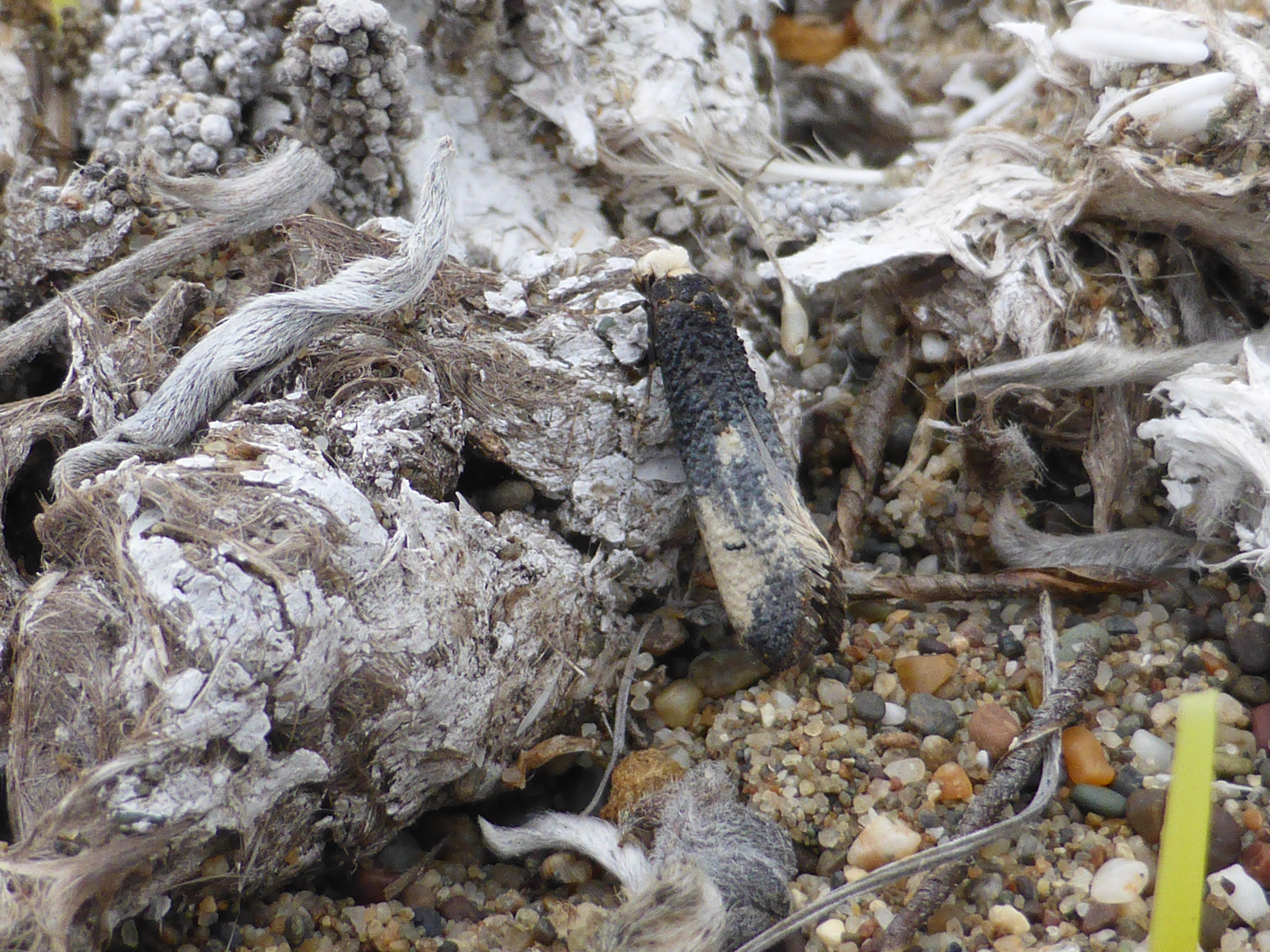

Scientific classification
- Kingdom: Animalia
- Phylum: Arthropoda
- Clade: Pancrustacea
- Class: Insecta
- Order: Lepidoptera
- Family: Tineidae
- Genus: Tinea
- Species: T. occidentella

Binomial name
- Tinea occidentella Chambers, 1880

= Tinea occidentella =

Species of moth

Tinea occidentella is a species of moth of the family Tineidae. It has a relatively large forewing from ca. 7–12 mm (0.28–0.47 in). The moth is dark grey with lighter central region of the forewing within which a darker spot or fleck is prominent. The common name “western clothes moth” is a misnomer as it does not eat clothes but only scat and pellets. It is common near the Pacific coast from the San Francisco Bay region through coastal northern Baja California. It is virtually restricted to coastal areas of high humidity derived from advective fog off the sea. The larvae feed upon keratin of fur and feathers in mammalian carnivore scat and in pellets of birds of prey. They are also reported to develop upon bird carcasses. The larval foods are very low in water, and keratin itself contains no water. The larvae obtain their water via that absorbed from the atmosphere of their high humidity environment by the fur and feathers of their diet.

== Etymology ==
Tinea, from late middle English, "worm." occidentella, "west."

== Taxonomy ==
Tinea Occidentella, Super family Tineoidea within the Ditrysia, Nonapoditrysian superfamilies. Family Tineidae.
