= Tinea sequens =

Scientific classification
- Kingdom: Animalia
- Phylum: Arthropoda
- Class: Insecta
- Order: Lepidoptera
- Family: Tineidae
- Genus: Tinea
- Species: T. sequens

Binomial name
- Tinea sequens Meyrick, 1919

Species of moth

Tinea sequens is a moth of the family Tineidae first described by Edward Meyrick in 1919. It is known from Guyana.

This species has a wingspan of 7-8 m. The forewings are white, with a few blackish specks and two subconfluent blackish-grey spots on the costa towards the base. There is a blackish-grey spot on the costa at two-fifths, where an oblique irregular more or less developed streak runs to the anterior end of a black dash in the disc beyond the middle. Another black dash is found between this and the termen, accompanied by a few dark grey scales and there is a blackish-grey spot on the costa at three-fourths, as well as an apical spot of blackish-grey sprinkles. The hindwings are light grey.
