= Apophatus =

Scientific classification
- Kingdom: Animalia
- Phylum: Arthropoda
- Class: Insecta
- Order: Lepidoptera
- Family: Palaephatidae
- Genus: Apophatus; Davis, 1986

Moth genus in family Palaephatidae

Apophatus is a genus of moths in the family Palaephatidae. It was described by Donald R. Davis in 1986.

== Species ==
- Apophatus parvus Davis, 1986
- Apophatus bifibratus Davis, 1986
