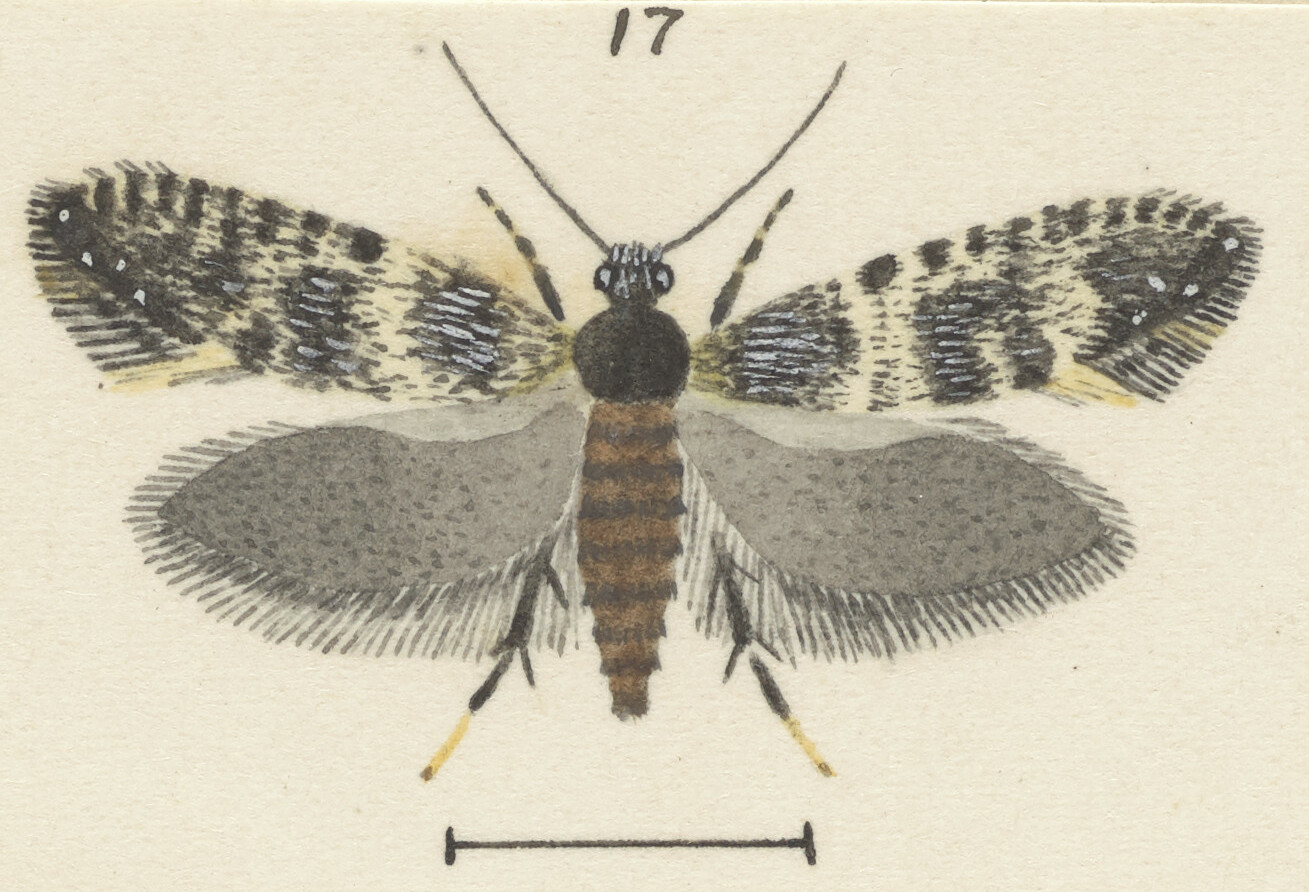
- Illustration of female
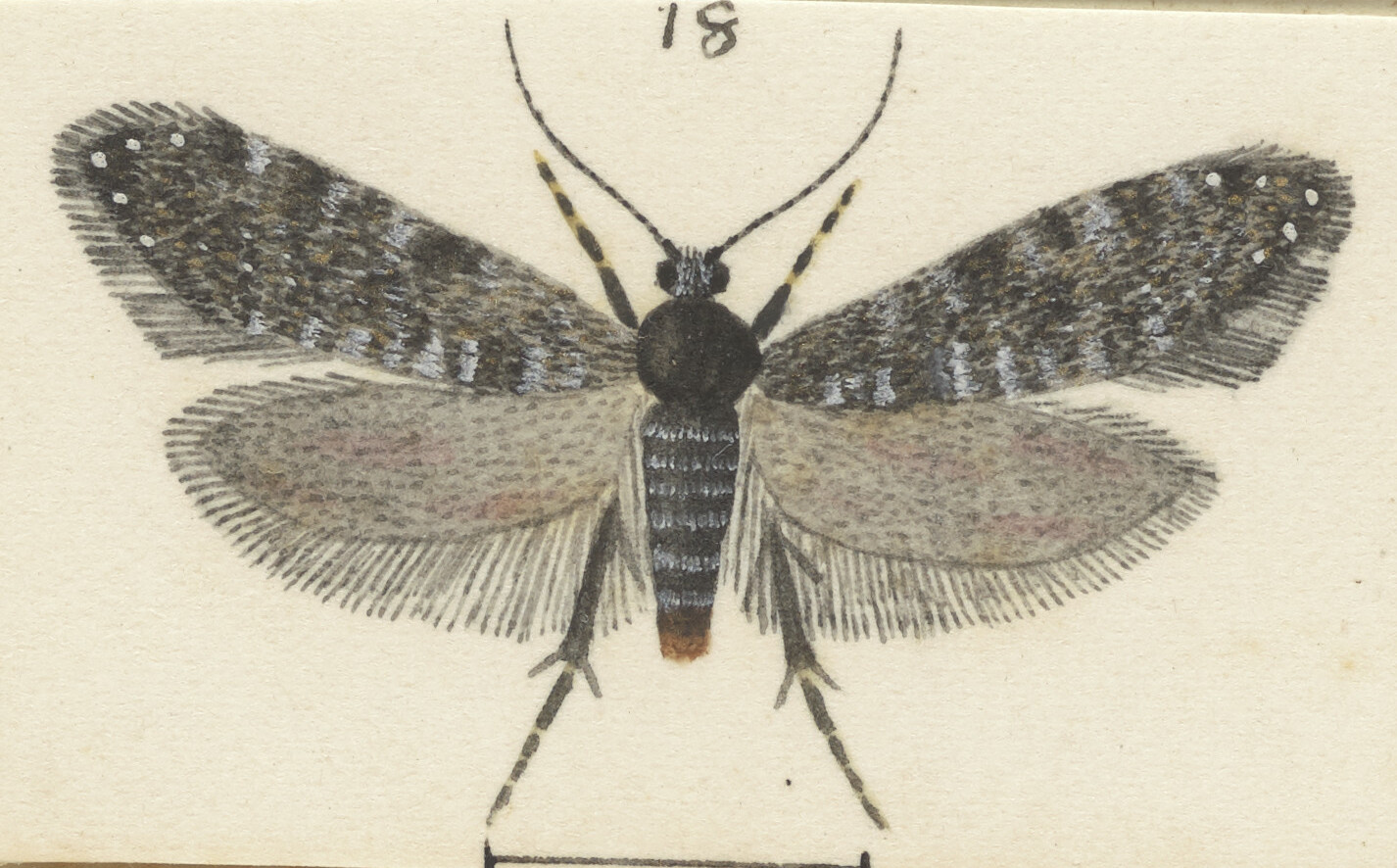
- Illustration of male

Scientific classification
- Kingdom: Animalia
- Phylum: Arthropoda
- Class: Insecta
- Order: Lepidoptera
- Family: Tineidae
- Genus: Tinea
- Species: T. atmogramma

Binomial name
- Tinea atmogramma Meyrick, 1927

= Tinea atmogramma =

Species of moth

Tinea atmogramma is a species of moth in the family Tineidae. It was described by Edward Meyrick in 1927. However the placement of this species within the genus Tinea is in doubt. As a result, this species has been referred to as Tinea (s.l.) atmogramma. This species is endemic to New Zealand.
