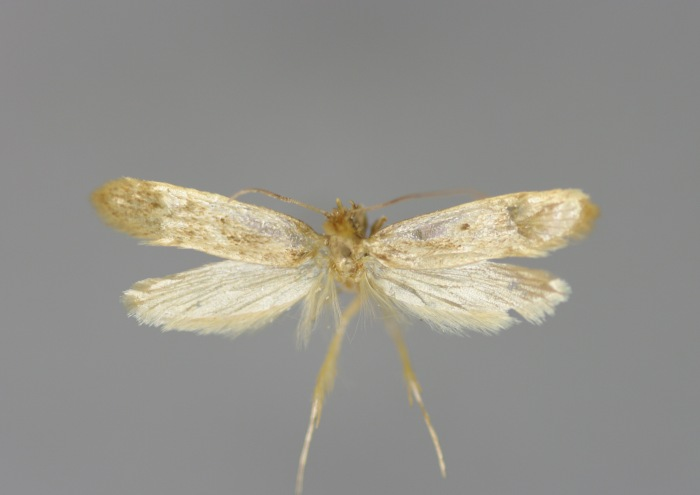

Scientific classification
- Kingdom: Animalia
- Phylum: Arthropoda
- Clade: Pancrustacea
- Class: Insecta
- Order: Lepidoptera
- Family: Tineidae
- Genus: Tinea
- Species: T. pallescentella

Binomial name
- Tinea pallescentella Stainton, 1851

Synonyms
- Tinea coacticella Zagulajev, 1954; Tinea galeatella Mabille, 1888; Tinea horosema Meyrick, 1931; Tinea nigrifoldella Gregson, 1856; Tinea semilineatella Knaben, 1944; Tinea stimulatrix Meyrick, 1931

= Tinea pallescentella =

Large pale clothes moth

Species of moth

Tinea pallescentella, the large pale clothes moth, is a moth of the family Tineidae. It is found in most of Europe (except the Iberian Peninsula and most of the Balkan Peninsula). It is also present in western North America, where it has been recorded from California. There are also records from South America (including Argentina) and Australia.

The wingspan is 12–15 millimetres (0.47–0.59 in). 14-lG mm. The head is light greyish ochreous, fuscous-mixed. Forewings are light greyish-ochreous mixed with fuscous; base of costa and a short basal subdorsal dash dark fuscous; stigmata dark fuscous, elongate, plical forming a more or less extended dash along fold; two indistinct whitish dots beyond second discal; some cloudy dark fuscous terminal spots. Hindwings very pale grey.

Adults are on wing year round.

The larvae feed on keratinous animal matter such as hair, wool, fur or feathers.
