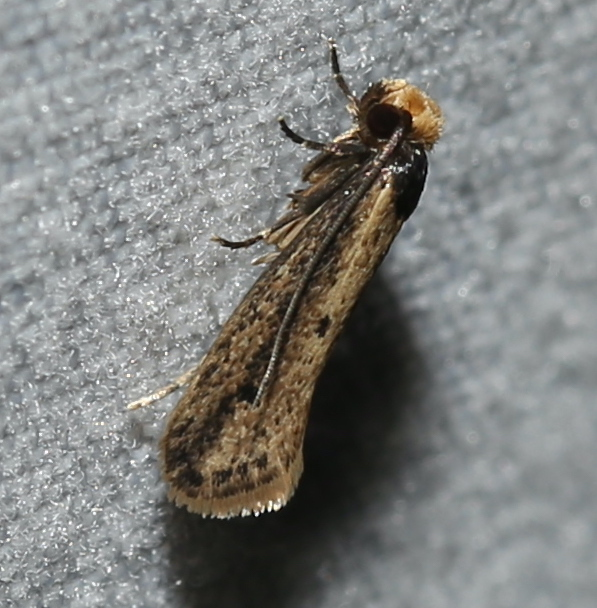

Scientific classification
- Kingdom: Animalia
- Phylum: Arthropoda
- Clade: Pancrustacea
- Class: Insecta
- Order: Lepidoptera
- Family: Tineidae
- Genus: Tinea
- Species: T. apicimaculella

Binomial name
- Tinea apicimaculella Chambers, 1875

= Tinea apicimaculella =

Species of moth

Tinea apicimaculella is a species of moth of the family Tineidae. It is found in North America (including Alabama, Illinois, Maryland, Massachusetts, Minnesota, North Carolina, Oklahoma, Ontario, Tennessee and Virginia).
