= Tinea xenodes =

Scientific classification
- Kingdom: Animalia
- Phylum: Arthropoda
- Class: Insecta
- Order: Lepidoptera
- Family: Tineidae
- Genus: Tinea
- Species: T. xenodes

Binomial name
- Tinea xenodes Meyrick, 1909

Species of moth

Tinea xenodes is a moth of the family Tineidae. It is known from Bolivia.

This species has a wingspan of 8–10 mm. The forewings are fuscous suffusedly irrorated (sprinkled) with dark fuscous. There is a small whitish-ochreous spot on the costa at five-sixths. The hindwings are rather dark bronzy fuscous.
