= Tinea prensoria =

Scientific classification
- Kingdom: Animalia
- Phylum: Arthropoda
- Class: Insecta
- Order: Lepidoptera
- Family: Tineidae
- Genus: Tinea
- Species: T. prensoria

Binomial name
- Tinea prensoria Meyrick, 1931

Species of moth

Tinea prensoria is a moth of the family Tineidae. It was first found in Chile.

This species has a wingspan of 14–15 mm.
