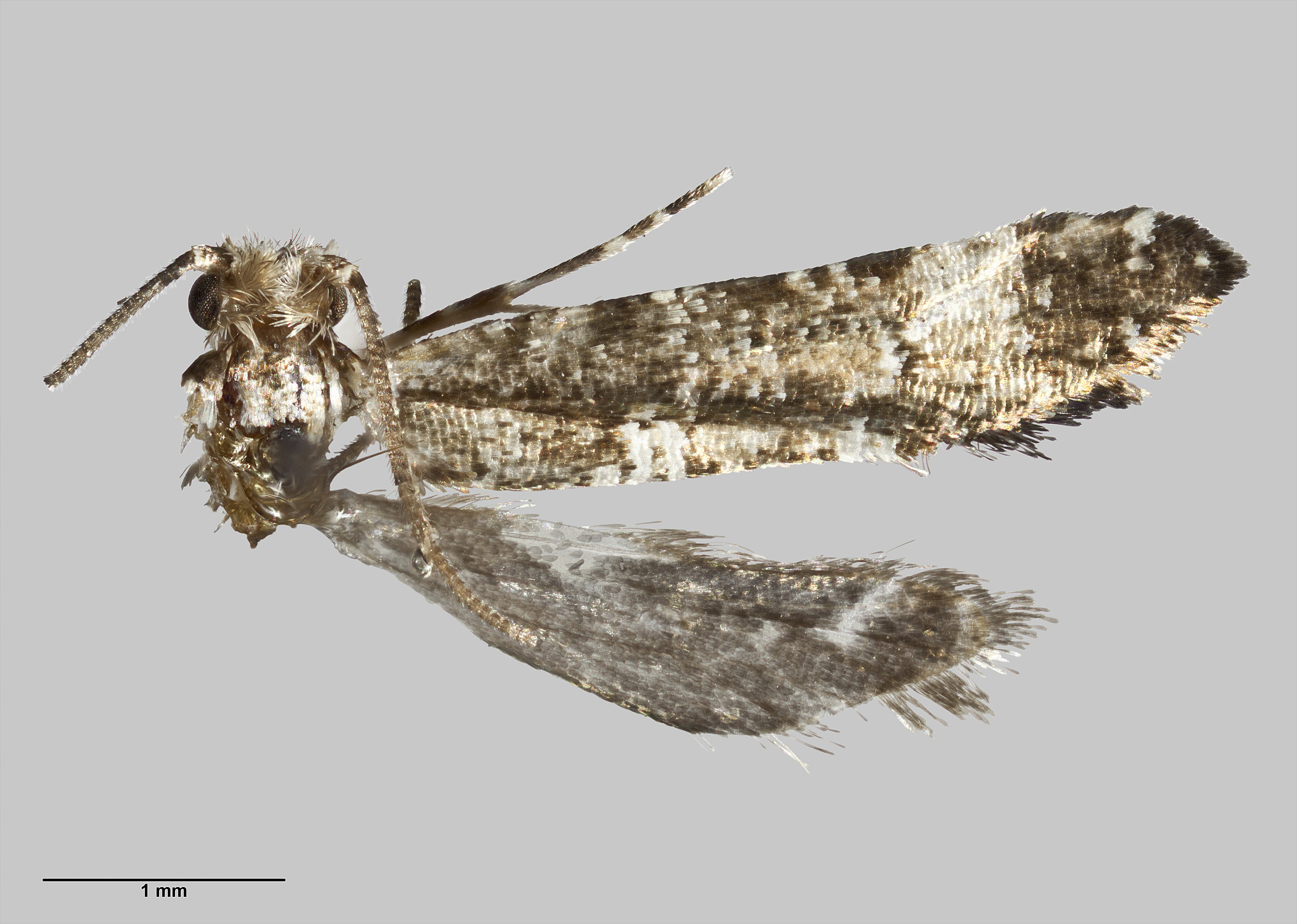
- Male holotype specimen

Scientific classification
- Kingdom: Animalia
- Phylum: Arthropoda
- Class: Insecta
- Order: Lepidoptera
- Family: Tineidae
- Genus: Tinea
- Species: T. conspecta

Binomial name
- Tinea conspecta Philpott, 1931

= Tinea conspecta =

Species of moth

Tinea conspecta is a species of moth in the family Tineidae. It was described by Alfred Philpott in 1931. However the placement of this species within the genus Tinea is in doubt. As a result, this species has been referred to as Tinea (s.l.) conspecta. This species is endemic to New Zealand.
