= Plesiophatus =

Scientific classification
- Kingdom: Animalia
- Phylum: Arthropoda
- Clade: Pancrustacea
- Class: Insecta
- Order: Lepidoptera
- Family: Palaephatidae
- Genus: Plesiophatus; Davis, 1986
- Species: P. inarmigerus

Binomial name
- Plesiophatus inarmigerus Davis, 1986

Genus of moths

Plesiophatus inarmigerus is a moth of the family Palaephatidae. It is the only species in the genus Plesiophatus. It was described by Donald R. Davis in 1986. It is found in the Andean lake region of Argentina and a somewhat disjunct site near the Chilean coast.

The length of the forewings is about 6 mm for males and 6-6.5 mm for females. Adults have dark fuscous forewings and light gray hindwings. They are on wing in February in one generation per year.

== Etymology ==
The specific name is derived from Latin inarmiger (meaning unarmed) and refers to the relatively simple male genitalia.
