= Tinea porphyropa =

Scientific classification
- Kingdom: Animalia
- Phylum: Arthropoda
- Class: Insecta
- Order: Lepidoptera
- Family: Tineidae
- Genus: Tinea
- Species: T. porphyropa

Binomial name
- Tinea porphyropa Meyrick, 1927

Synonyms
- Tinea batuensis Bradley, 1973

Species of moth

Tinea porphyropa is a cave-dwelling moth of the family Tineidae. It is known from Sumatra, Indonesia and Malaysia.

The wingspan is about 9 mm. The forewings are rather dark purple-grey with a cloudy darker spot on the end of the cell. The hindwings are rather dark bronzy-fuscous.

== Subspecies ==
- Tinea porphyropa porphyropa
- Tinea porphyropa batuensis Bradley, 1973 (West Malaysia)
