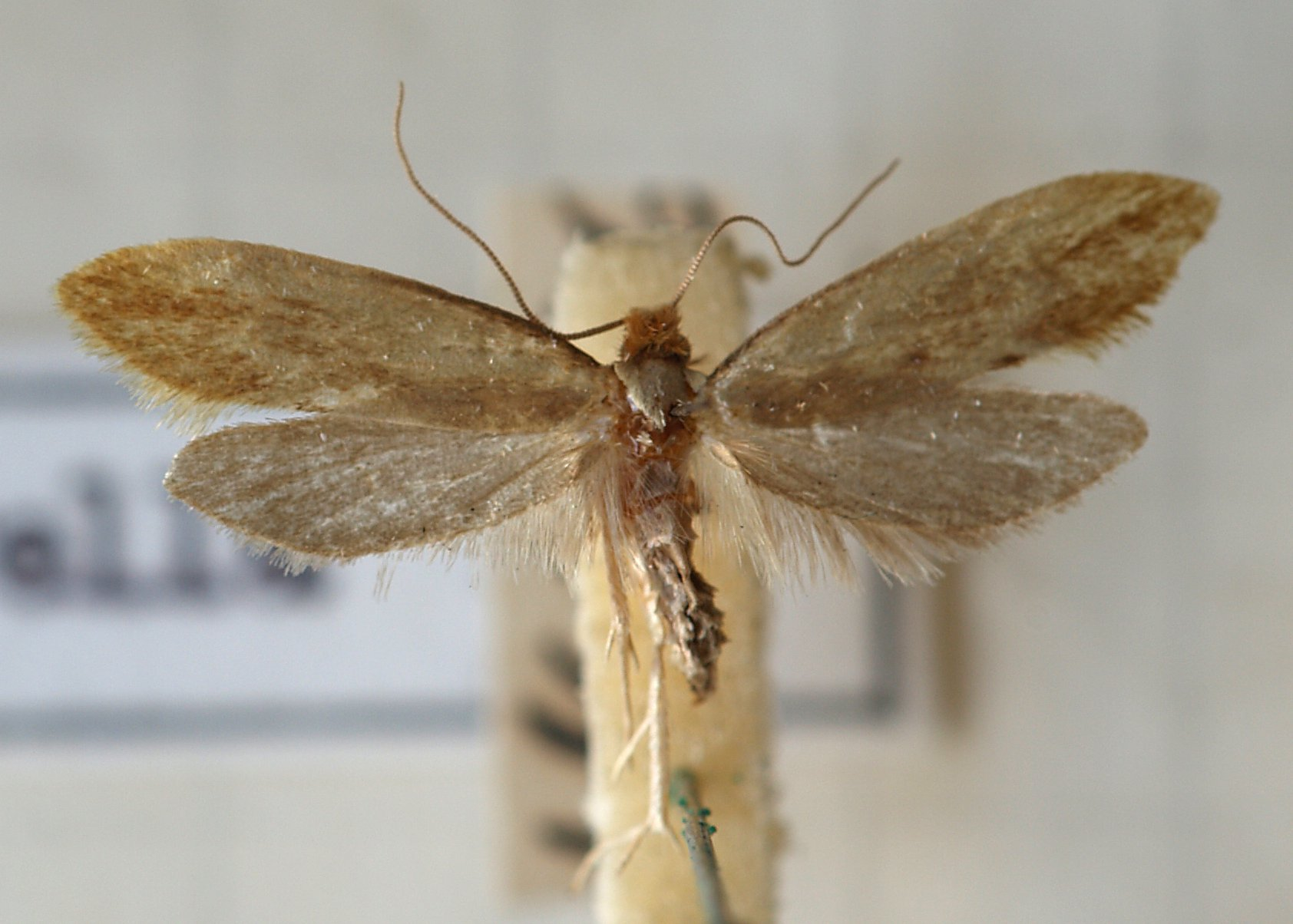
- Faded adult specimen

Scientific classification
- Kingdom: Animalia
- Phylum: Arthropoda
- Clade: Pancrustacea
- Class: Insecta
- Order: Lepidoptera
- Family: Tineidae
- Genus: Tinea
- Species: T. semifulvella

Binomial name
- Tinea semifulvella Haworth, 1828

= Tinea semifulvella =

Species of moth

Tinea semifulvella is a species of tineoid moth. It belongs to the fungus moth family (Tineidae), and therein to the nominate subfamily Tineinae. It is widespread and common in much of the western Palearctic, but seems to be absent from Portugal and the Balkans as well as the outlying islands (e.g. Iceland). The nocturnal adults are on the wing around May to September, depending on the location, and are easily attracted to light sources.

This smallish moth has a wingspan of 14–22 millimetres (0.55–0.87 in) when adult. They are more colorful than usual for the genus Tinea, though their colors usually fade considerably in dead specimens. The forewings are grey with a brownish tinge at the base, and rusty-red in the outer part. They have a black dot on the edge bordering the hindwings. The latter are a paler and purer grey. The body is dusky grey, but the head has a tuft of brick-red hair. The forewings, but especially the hindwings are surrounded by a hairy fringe.

The caterpillars feed on natural fibers, predominantly of animal origin, such as feathers, furs and wool; they have been found in bird nests and were recorded to eat rags and old clothes. But they are not notably synanthropic and generally eat only food that is outdoors; unlike the closely related case-bearing clothes moth (T. pellionella) the present species is rarely if at all recorded as a pest.
