= Sesommata holocapna =

Scientific classification
- Kingdom: Animalia
- Phylum: Arthropoda
- Class: Insecta
- Order: Lepidoptera
- Family: Palaephatidae
- Genus: Sesommata
- Species: S. holocapna

Binomial name
- Sesommata holocapna (Meyrick, 1931)

Synonyms
- Tinea holocapna Meyrick, 1931

Moth species in family Palaephatidae

Sesommata holocapna is a moth of the family Palaephatidae. It was described by Edward Meyrick in 1931. It is found in the temperate Valdivian forest region of southern Argentina and Chile.

The length of the forewings is 5–6.5 mm for males and 6–7 mm for females. Adult males have dark fuscous forewings and a rounded mass of broad sex scales. The forewings of the females are slightly lighter in colour and often sprinkled with white over the distal half. Adults are on wing from November to January in one generation per year.

The larvae feed on Diostea juncea.
