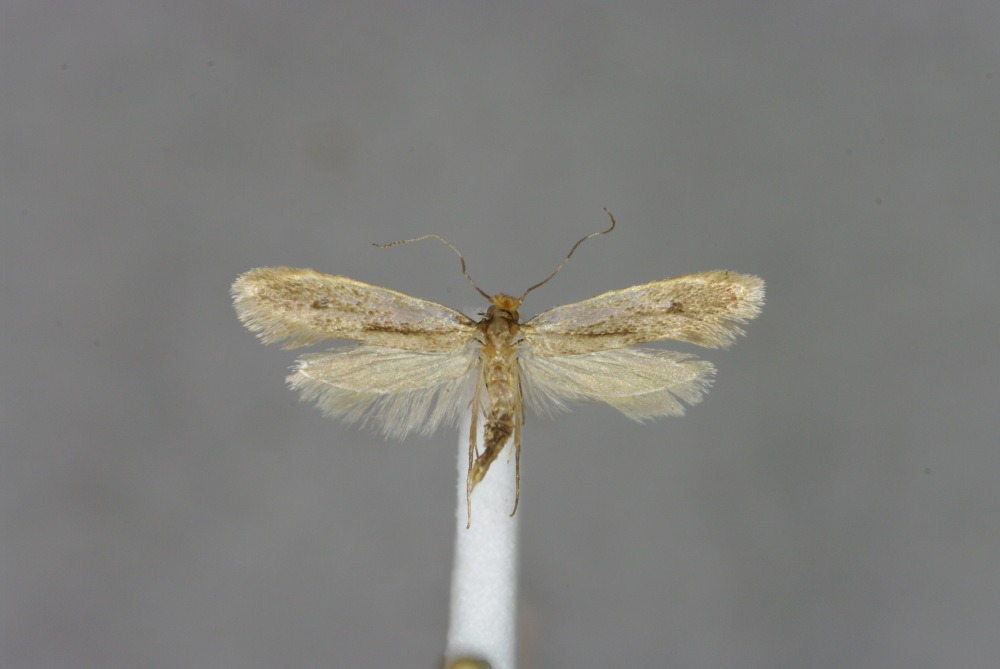

Scientific classification
- Kingdom: Animalia
- Phylum: Arthropoda
- Class: Insecta
- Order: Lepidoptera
- Family: Tineidae
- Genus: Tinea
- Species: T. steueri

Binomial name
- Tinea steueri Petersen, 1966

= Tinea steueri =

Species of moth

Tinea steueri is a moth belonging to the family Tineidae. The species was first described by Petersen in 1866.

It is native to Europe.
