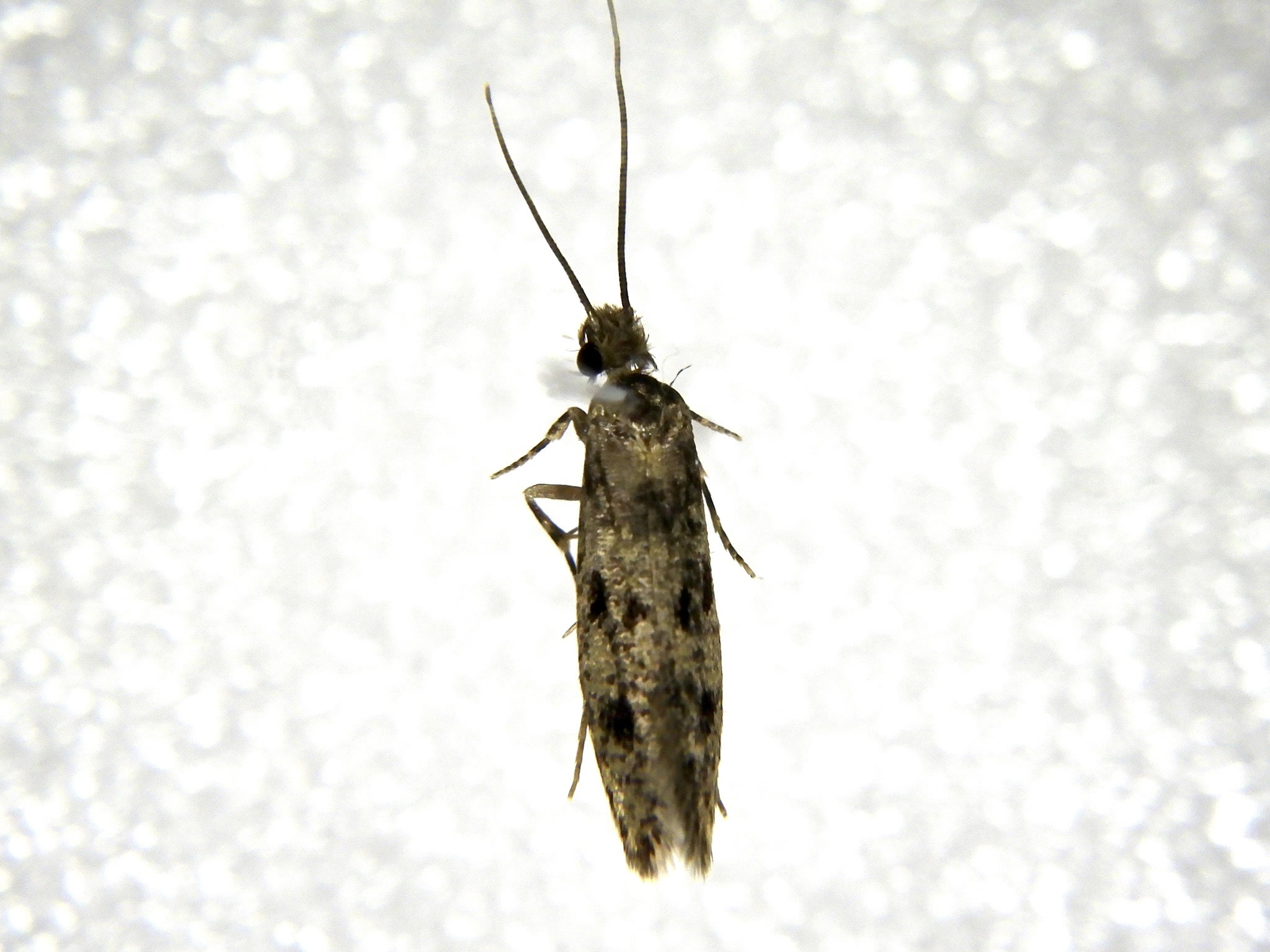

Scientific classification
- Kingdom: Animalia
- Phylum: Arthropoda
- Clade: Pancrustacea
- Class: Insecta
- Order: Lepidoptera
- Family: Tineidae
- Genus: Tinea
- Species: T. translucens

Binomial name
- Tinea translucens Meyrick, 1917

= Tinea translucens =

Species of moth

Tinea translucens is a moth belonging to the family Tineidae. The species was first described by Edward Meyrick in 1917.

It has a cosmopolitan distribution.
