= Sesommata =

Scientific classification
- Kingdom: Animalia
- Phylum: Arthropoda
- Class: Insecta
- Order: Lepidoptera
- Family: Palaephatidae
- Genus: Sesommata; Davis, 1986

Moth genus in family Palaephatidae

Sesommata is a genus of moths in the family Palaephatidae.

== Species ==
- Sesommata leuroptera Davis, 1986
- Sesommata trachyptera Davis, 1986
- Sesommata holocapna (Meyrick, 1931)
- Sesommata paraplatysaris Davis, 1986
- Sesommata platysaris (Meyrick, 1931)
- Sesommata albimaculata Davis, 1986
