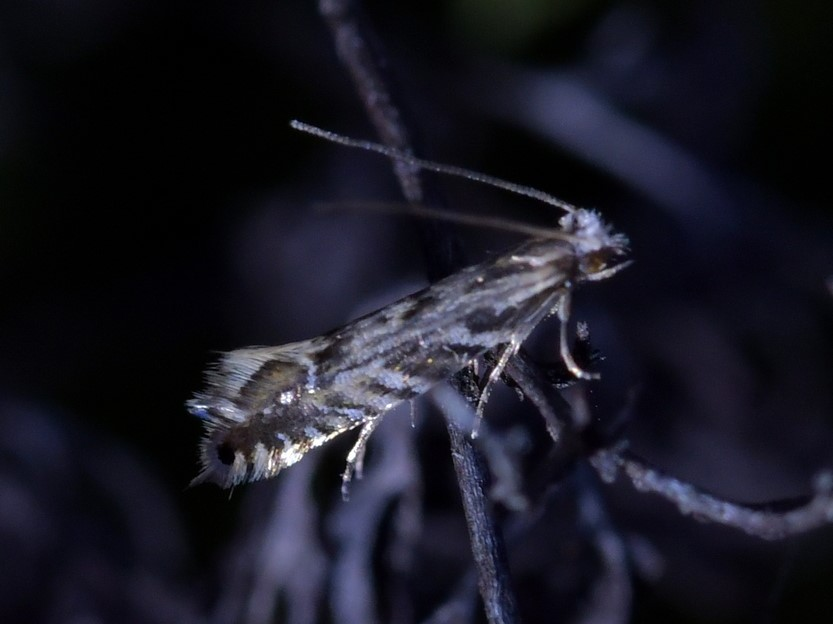

Scientific classification
- Kingdom: Animalia
- Phylum: Arthropoda
- Class: Insecta
- Order: Lepidoptera
- Family: Tineidae
- Genus: Tinea
- Species: T. accusatrix

Binomial name
- Tinea accusatrix Meyick, 1916

= Tinea accusatrix =

Species of moth

Tinea accusatrix is a species of moth in the family Tineidae. It was first described by Edward Meyrick in 1916. However the placement of this species within the genus Tinea is in doubt. As a result, this species has been referred to as Tinea (s.l.) accusatrix. This species is endemic to New Zealand.

== Description ==
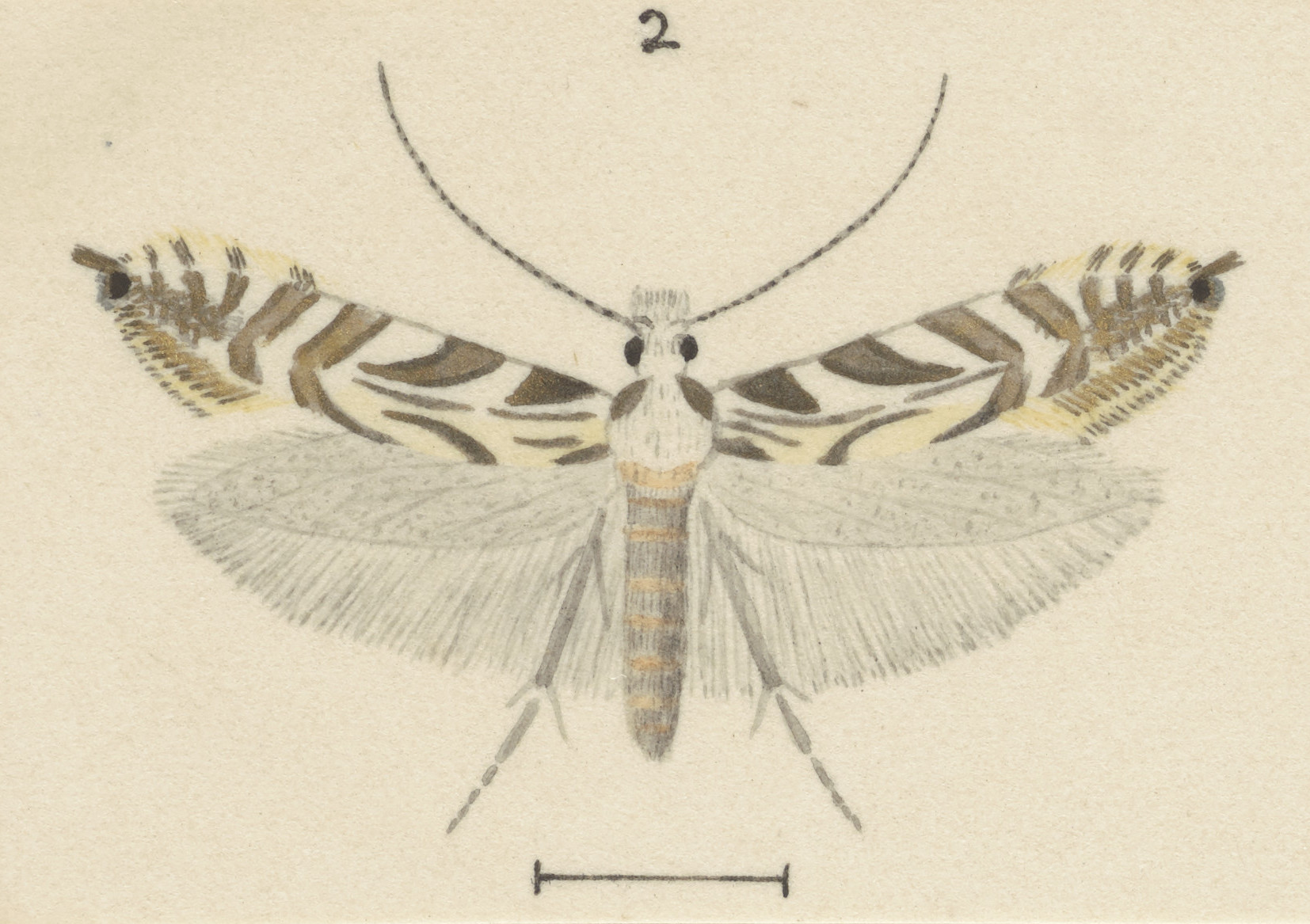
Illustration of T. accusatrix by George Hudson.

The wingspan is 8–10 mm. The forewings are dark fuscous with a short fine white median longitudinal line from the base and oblique white streaks from the costa at one-fourth and the middle reaching more than half across the wing, and shorter oblique marks from the dorsum opposite. There are seven white wedge-shaped marks from the costa on the posterior half, anteriorly somewhat oblique, posteriorly direct, one from the tornus and a dot on the termen beneath the apex, the space between these with violet and bronzy reflections. There is also a round deep black spot at the apex. The hindwings are light grey, with bronzy and purple reflections.
