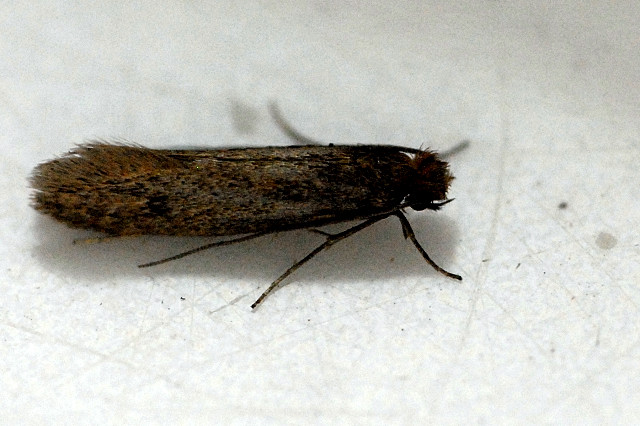
- Case-bearing clothes moth (T. pellionella), adult from Commanster (Belgian Ardennes)

Scientific classification
- Kingdom: Animalia
- Phylum: Arthropoda
- Clade: Pancrustacea
- Class: Insecta
- Order: Lepidoptera
- Family: Tineidae
- Subfamily: Tineinae
- Genus: Tinea; Linnaeus, 1758

Type species
- Phalaena (Tinea) pellionella Linnaeus, 1758

Species
- Several, see text

Synonyms
- Numerous, see text

= Tinea (moth) =

Genus of moths

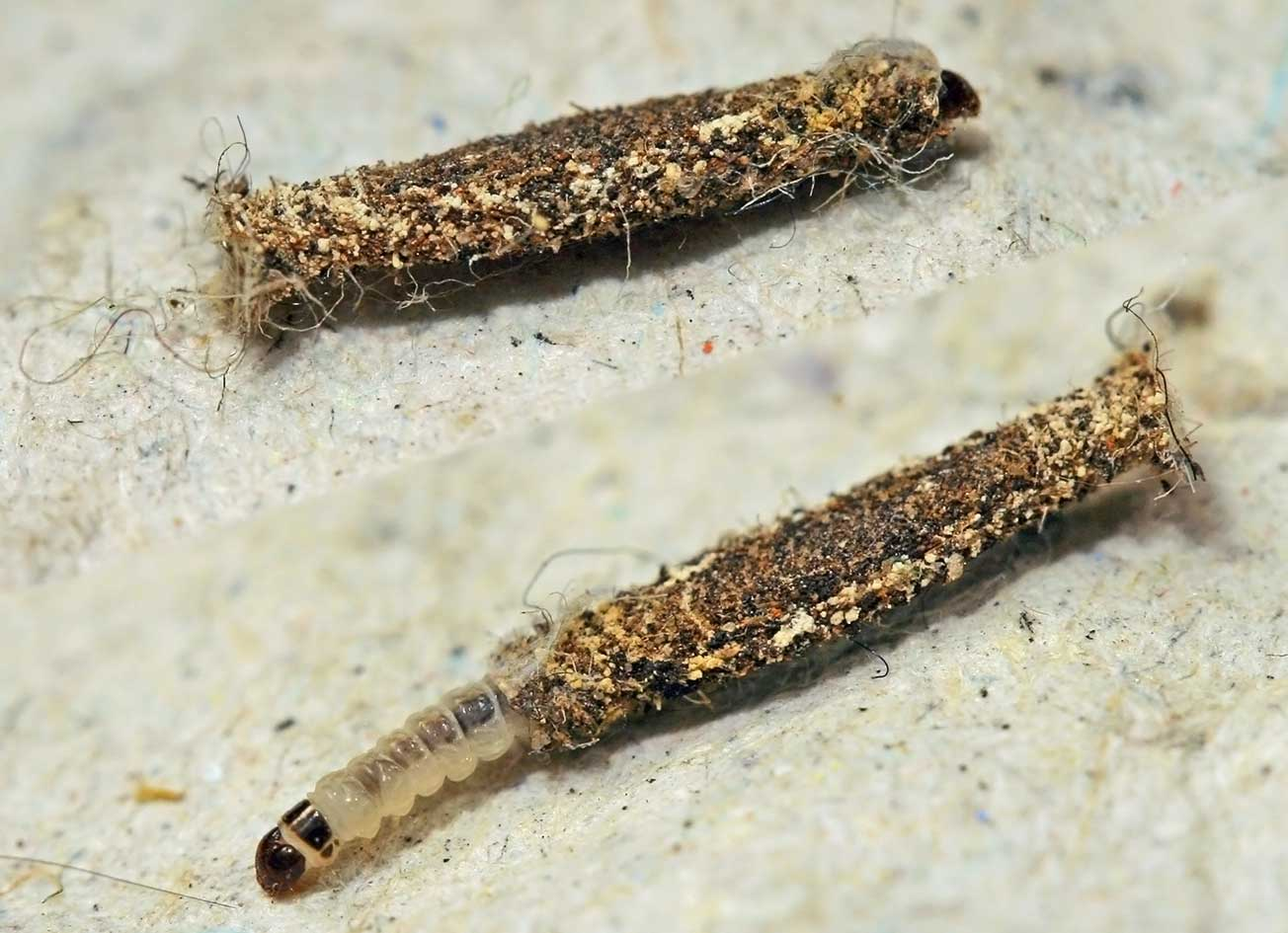
Larva in the case typical of the genus. It can turn around in the case to protrude its head and legs at either end and drag the case in either direction.

Tinea is a genus of the fungus moth family, Tineidae. Therein, it belongs to the subfamily Tineinae. As evident by its name, it is the type genus of its subfamily and family. Established as one of the first subgroups of "Phalaena", it used to contain many species of Tineidae that are nowadays placed in other genera, as well as a few moths nowadays placed elsewhere.

== Selected species ==
Species of Tinea include:

- Tinea accusatrix Meyick, 1916 (New Zealand)
- Tinea analytica Meyrick, 1919 (from Guyana)
- Tinea antricola Meyrick, 1924 (India, Sumatra, Indonesia and Malaysia)
- Tinea apicimaculella Chambers, 1875 (North America)
- Tinea atmogramma Meyrick, 1927 (New Zealand)
- Tinea atriflua Meyrick, 1919 (from Ontario, Canada)
- Tinea basifasciella Ragonot, 1895
- Tinea behrensella Chambers, 1875
- Tinea bothniella Svensson, 1953
- Tinea borboropis Meyrick, 1919 (from Guyana)
- Tinea caerula Meyrick, 1927 (from Peru)
- Tinea carnariella Clemens, 1859
- Tinea catalytica Meyrick, 1919 (from Colombia)
- Tinea chaotica Meyrick, 1893
- Tinea chloroceros Meyrick, 1919 (from Ecuador)
- Tinea columbariella Wocke, 1877 (cosmopolitan)
- Tinea conferta Meyrick, 1914 (New Zealand)
- Tinea conspecta Philpott, 1931 (New Zealand)
- Tinea conchylitis Meyrick, 1919 (from Peru)
- Tinea coracopis Meyrick, 1909 (from Peru)
- Tinea corynephora Turner, 1927
- Tinea croceoverticella Chambers, 1876
- Tinea criochrysa Meyrick (from Brazil)
- Tinea delotoma Meyrick, 1919 (from French Guyana)
- Tinea dividua Philpott, 1928
- Tinea drymonoma Turner, 1923 (Australia)
- Tinea dubiella Stainton, 1859 (New Zealand)
- Tinea extracta Meyrick (from Guyana)
- Tinea flavescentella Haworth, 1828
- Tinea flavofimbriella (Chrétien, 1925)
- Tinea grumella Zeller, 1873
- Tinea gypsomicta Meyrick, 1931 (from Chile)
- Tinea holocapna Meyrick, 1931 (from Argentina)
- Tinea irrepta Braun, 1926
- Tinea isodonta Meyrick, 1931 (from Chile)
- Tinea lanella Pierce & Metcalfe, 1934
- Tinea mandarinella Dietz, 1905
- Tinea melanoptycha (Turner, 1939)
- Tinea messalina Robinson, 1979
- Tinea misceella Chambers, 1873
- Tinea montezuma Meyrick (from Bolivia))
- Tinea murariella Staudinger, 1859
- Tinea niveocapitella Chambers, 1875
- Tinea occidentella Chambers, 1880 (California, Baja California)
- Tinea omichlopis Meyrick, 1928 (= T. nonimella)
- Tinea pallescentella Stainton, 1851 (= T. galeatella) (from Argentina)
- Tinea oxymora Meyrick (from Peru)
- Tinea phaeonephela Meyrick (from Peru)
- Tinea platysaris Meyrick (from Argentina)
- Tinea pellionella – case-bearing clothes moth
- Tinea poecilella Rebel, 1940
- Tinea porphyropa Meyrick, 1927 (Sumatra, Indonesia and Malaysia)
- Tinea porphyrota Meyrick, 1893 (tentatively placed here)
- Tinea praeumbrata Meyrick (from Guyana)
- Tinea prensoria Meyrick, 1931 (from Chile)
- Tinea semifulvella Haworth, 1828 (palearctic)
- Tinea sequens Meyrick, 1919 (from Guyana)
- Tinea steueri Petersen, 1966
- Tinea straminiella Chambers, 1873
- Tinea svenssoni Opheim, 1965 (Northern Europe & America)
- Tinea thoracestrigella Chambers, 1876
- Tinea translucens Meyrick, 1917 (cosmopolitan)
- Tinea tridectis Meyrick, 1893
- Tinea trinotella (Tbhunberg, 1794) (western Palearctic)
- Tinea tylodes Meyrick (from Canada)
- Tinea unomaculella Chambers, 1875
- Tinea xanthostictella Dietz, 1905
- Tinea xenodes Meyrick, 1909 (from Bolivia)

Species formerly placed here include for example Ceratobia oxymora. Before the 19th century, many unrelated moths were placed in Tinea at one time or another.

== Synonyms ==
Junior synonyms of Tinea are:

- Acedes Hübner, [1825]
- Autoses Hübner, [1825]
- Chrysoryctis Meyrick, 1886
- Dystinea Börner in Brohmer, 1925
- Monopina Zagulyaev, 1955
- Scleroplasta Meyrick, 1919
- Ses Hübner, 1822
- Taenia (lapsus; non Linnaeus, 1758: preoccupied)
- Tinaea (lapsus)
- Tinearia Rafinesque, 1815 (unjustified emendation; non Schellenberg, 1803: preoccupied)
- Tineopis Zagulyaev, 1960

Edosa is sometimes included in Tinea; it is here treated as doubtfully distinct genus for the time being.
