= Palaephatidae =

- Azaleodes micronipha

Scientific classification
- Kingdom: Animalia
- Phylum: Arthropoda
- Clade: Pancrustacea
- Class: Insecta
- Order: Lepidoptera
- Infraorder: Heteroneura
- Clade: Eulepidoptera
- Clade: Etimonotrysia
- Superfamily: Palaephatoidea
- Family: Palaephatidae; Davis, 1986

Genera
- Apophatus; Azaleodes; Metaphatus; Palaephatus; Plesiophatus; Ptyssoptera; Sesommata

Diversity
- About 7 genera and 57 species

Small family of moths

Palaephatoidea is a superfamily of insects in the order Lepidoptera with a single family, Palaephatidae with seven known genera. These "Gondwanaland moths" exhibit a disjunct distribution occurring mainly in South America (Davis, 1986), with four species in eastern Australia and Tasmania and one in South Africa (Davis, 1999). The larvae spin together leaves of Proteaceae (Ptyssoptera) or Verbenaceae (Azaleodes) (Nielsen, 1987). Palaephatoidea, a typical monotrysian group, is one two main candidates as the sister group of most of the Lepidoptera, the Ditrysia (see Tischerioidea and also Wiegmann et al., 2002). The center of distribution of the Palaephatidae is concentrated in cool, moist regions of temperate forest dominated by Nothofagus and associated vegetation in Southern Chile (Davis, 1986).

== Sources ==
- Firefly Encyclopedia of Insects and Spiders, edited by Christopher O'Toole, ISBN 1-55297-612-2, 2002
