= List of moths of Australia (Palaephatidae) =

Partial list of Australian moths

This is a list of the Australian moth species of the family Palaephatidae. It also acts as an index to the species articles and forms part of the full List of moths of Australia.

- Azaleodes brachyceros Nielsen, 1987
- Azaleodes fuscipes Nielsen, 1987
- Azaleodes megaceros Nielsen, 1987
- Azaleodes micronipha Turner, 1923
- Ptyssoptera acrozyga (Meyrick, 1893)
- Ptyssoptera lativittella (Walker, 1864)
- Ptyssoptera melitocoma (Meyrick, 1893)
- Ptyssoptera phaeochrysa (Turner, 1926)
- Ptyssoptera teleochra (Meyrick, 1893)
- Ptyssoptera tetropa (Meyrick, 1893)
- Ptyssoptera tryphera (Meyrick, 1893)
