= A. fuscipes =

A. fuscipes may refer to:

- Abacetus fuscipes, a ground beetle
- Aeoloplides fuscipes, the southern coast bush grasshopper, found in North America
- Agrypnus fuscipes, a synonym of Lanelater fuscipes, a click beetle found in Madagascar, Réunion, Sri Lanka, India, and Mainland Southeast Asia
- Andrena fuscipes, a mining bee found in the Palearctic
- Argyroeides fuscipes, a moth found in Brazil
- Armillaria fuscipes, a fungus
- Atomaria fuscipes, a silken fungus beetle native to Europe
- Azaleodes fuscipes, a moth found in Australia
