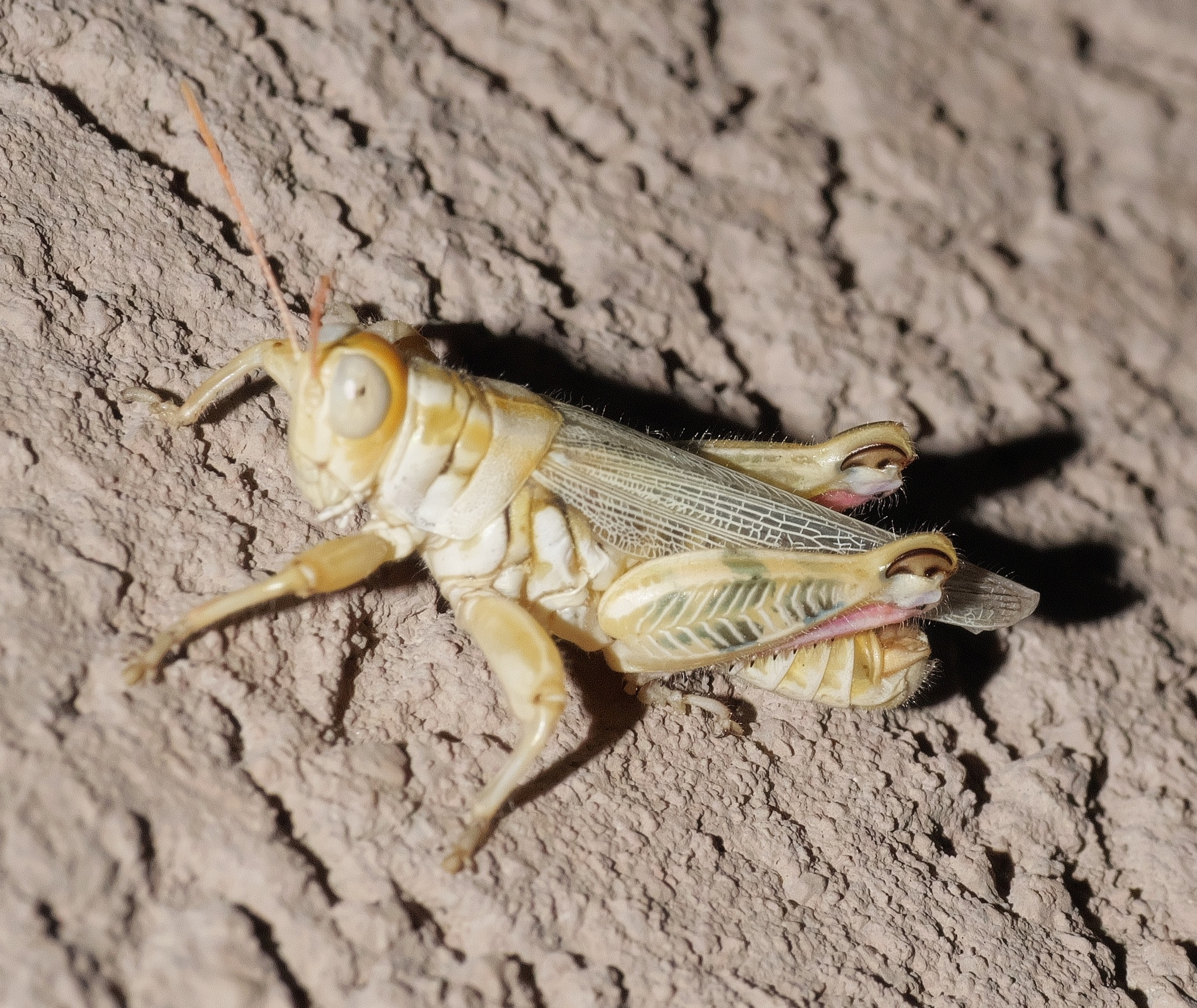
- Aeoloplides tenuipennis, Nevada

Scientific classification
- Kingdom: Animalia
- Phylum: Arthropoda
- Clade: Pancrustacea
- Class: Insecta
- Order: Orthoptera
- Suborder: Caelifera
- Family: Acrididae
- Tribe: Melanoplini
- Genus: Aeoloplides
- Species: A. tenuipennis

Binomial name
- Aeoloplides tenuipennis (Scudder, 1897)

= Aeoloplides tenuipennis =

Species of grasshopper

Aeoloplides tenuipennis, known generally as the narrow-winged saltbush grasshopper or narrow-winged bush grasshopper, is a species of spur-throated grasshopper in the family Acrididae. It is commonly found in eastern California, Arizona and southwestern New Mexico north through Utah and southern Nevada to southern Idaho.

== Ecology ==
Aeoloplides tenuipennis inhabits many parts of southern United States and northern Mexico. Its food plants inhabit Lower Sonoran life zone desert scrub, alkali flats, and grasslands. In southeastern Arizona, it is abundant on fourwing saltbush, Atriplex canescens; it also occurs on cattle saltbush, Atriplex polycarpa, seepweed or seabite, Suaeda, greasewood, Sarcobatus vermiculatus, and introduced prickly Russian thistle, Salsola tra. The specialized chenopod diet includes noxious plants such as prickly Russian thistle (tumbleweed), and A. tenuipennis is generally considered innocuous to beneficial where cattle are grazed.

== Economical factors ==
Many species of grasshoppers, like Aeoloplides tenuipennis, have posed a threat to agricultural economy in regards to pest management. They have been known to alter crop life and decrease agricultural profits. Research has been done in understanding the early stages of the narrow-winged saltbush grasshopper, known as nymph stages, in order to decrease grasshopper destruction in a environmentally friendly manner.
