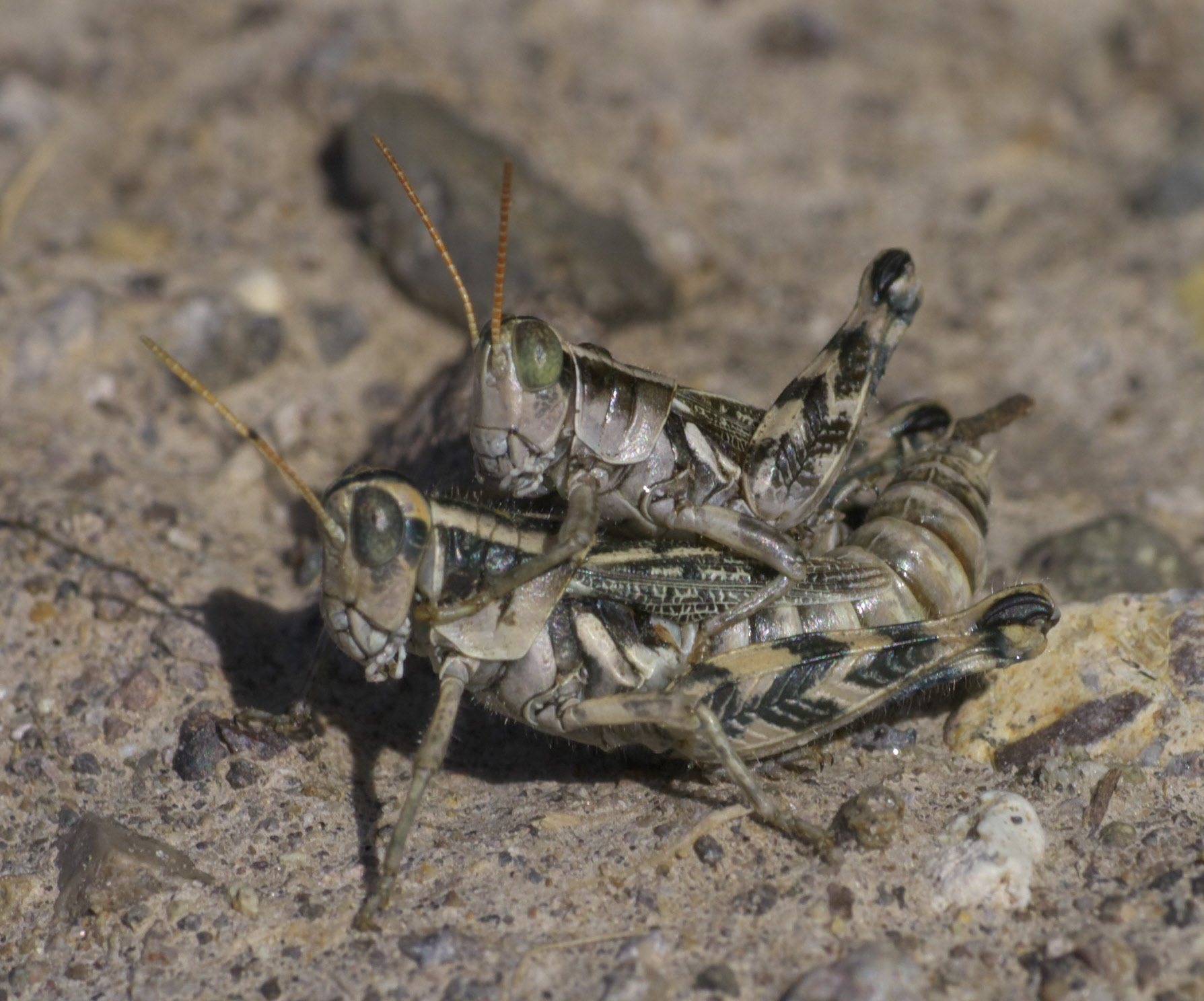

Scientific classification
- Kingdom: Animalia
- Phylum: Arthropoda
- Clade: Pancrustacea
- Class: Insecta
- Order: Orthoptera
- Suborder: Caelifera
- Family: Acrididae
- Tribe: Melanoplini
- Genus: Aeoloplides
- Species: A. turnbulli

Binomial name
- Aeoloplides turnbulli (Thomas, 1872)

= Aeoloplides turnbulli =

Species of grasshopper

Aeoloplides turnbulli, known generally as thistle grasshopper, is a species of spur-throated grasshopper in the family Acrididae. Other common names include the Russian thistle grasshopper and saltbush grasshopper. It is found in North America.

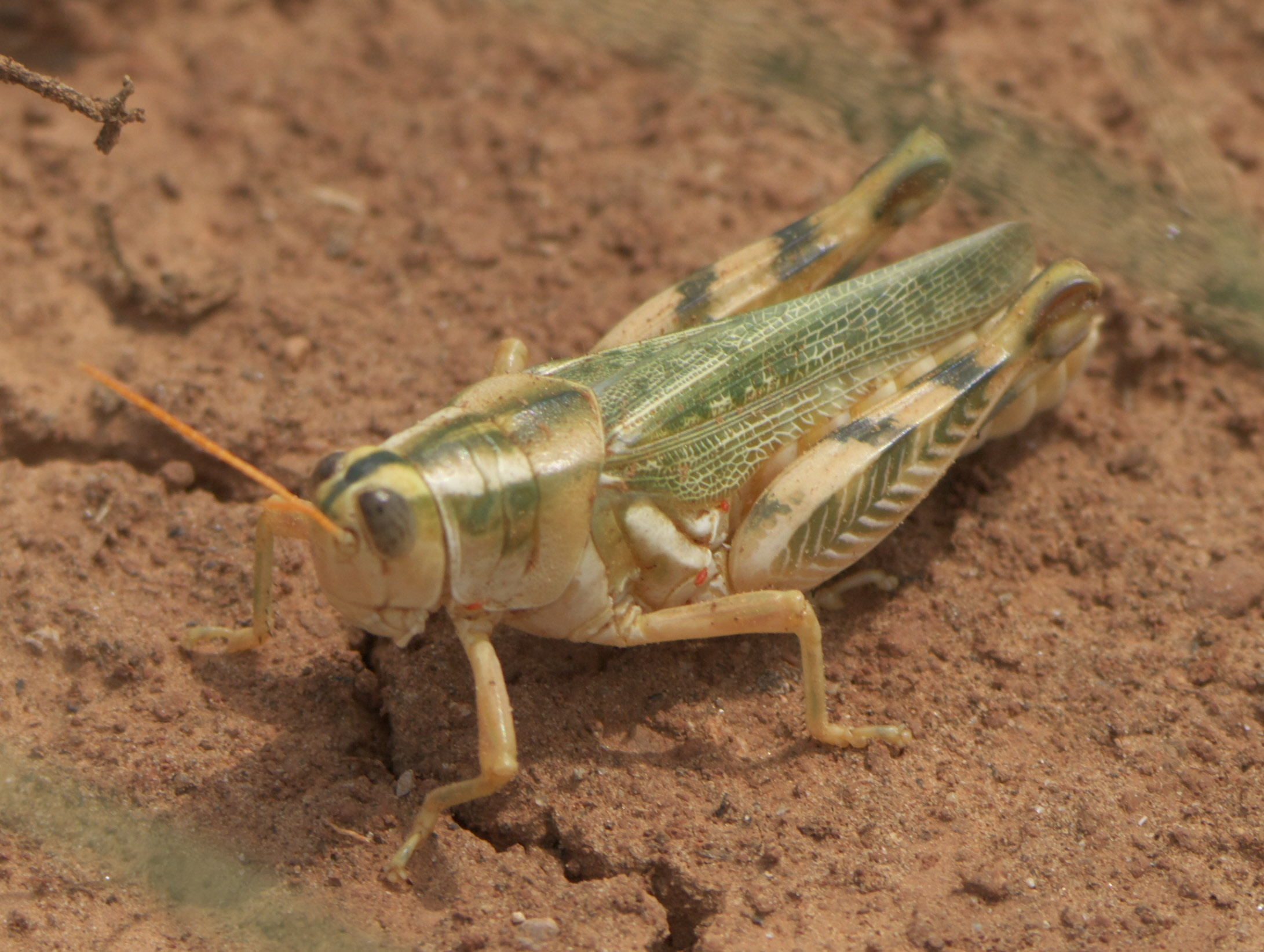
Thistle grasshopper, Aeoloplides turnbulli

== Subspecies ==
These two subspecies belong to the species Aeoloplides turnbulli:

- Aeoloplides turnbulli bruneri (Caudell, 1907)^{i c g}
- Aeoloplides turnbulli turnbulli (Thomas, 1872)^{i c g}

Data sources: i = ITIS, c = Catalogue of Life, g = GBIF, b = Bugguide.net
