= Aeoloplides fratercula =

Scientific classification
- Kingdom: Animalia
- Phylum: Arthropoda
- Clade: Pancrustacea
- Class: Insecta
- Order: Orthoptera
- Suborder: Caelifera
- Family: Acrididae
- Tribe: Melanoplini
- Genus: Aeoloplides
- Species: A. fratercula

Binomial name
- Aeoloplides fratercula (Hebard, 1919)

Species of grasshopper

Aeoloplides fratercula, the northern coast bush grasshopper, is a species of spur-throated grasshopper in the family Acrididae. It is found in North America.
