= Aeoloplides elegans =

Scientific classification
- Kingdom: Animalia
- Phylum: Arthropoda
- Clade: Pancrustacea
- Class: Insecta
- Order: Orthoptera
- Suborder: Caelifera
- Family: Acrididae
- Tribe: Melanoplini
- Genus: Aeoloplides
- Species: A. elegans

Binomial name
- Aeoloplides elegans (Scudder, 1897)

Species of grasshopper

Aeoloplides elegans, the elegant saltbush grasshopper, is a species of spur-throated grasshopper in the family Acrididae. It is found in North America.
