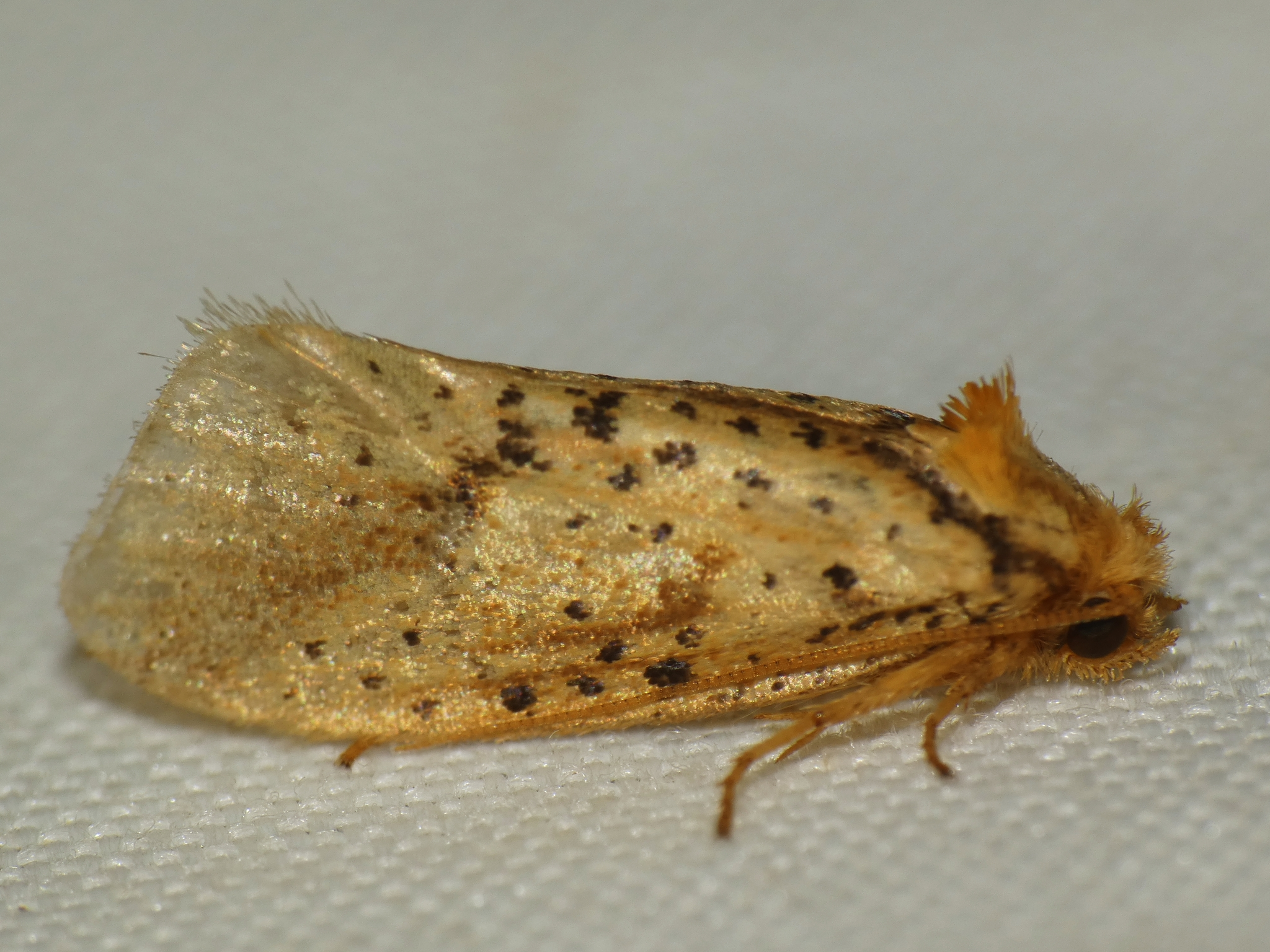
- Azaleodes fuscipes

Scientific classification
- Kingdom: Animalia
- Phylum: Arthropoda
- Class: Insecta
- Order: Lepidoptera
- Family: Palaephatidae
- Genus: Azaleodes; Turner, 1923

= Azaleodes =

Moth genus in family Palaephatidae

Azaleodes is a genus of moths of the family Palaephatidae. The genus is endemic to Australia.

== Distribution ==
Species are only known from rainforest from Wollongong in New South Wales to Cooktown in Queensland.

== Species ==
- Azaleodes brachyceros Nielsen, 1987
- Azaleodes fuscipes Nielsen, 1987
- Azaleodes megaceros Nielsen, 1987
- Azaleodes micronipha Turner, 1923
