= Ptyssoptera =

Scientific classification
- Kingdom: Animalia
- Phylum: Arthropoda
- Clade: Pancrustacea
- Class: Insecta
- Order: Lepidoptera
- Family: Palaephatidae
- Genus: Ptyssoptera; Turner, 1933

Moth genus in family Palaephatidae

Ptyssoptera is a genus of moths in the family Palaephatidae, first described by Alfred Jefferis Turner in 1933. The name is derived from Greek: πτυσσοπτερος, lit. 'with crumpled wing'.

== Species ==
- Ptyssoptera acrozyga
- Ptyssoptera lativittella
- Ptyssoptera melitocoma
- Ptyssoptera phaeochrysa
- Ptyssoptera teleochra
- Ptyssoptera tetropa
- Ptyssoptera tryphera
