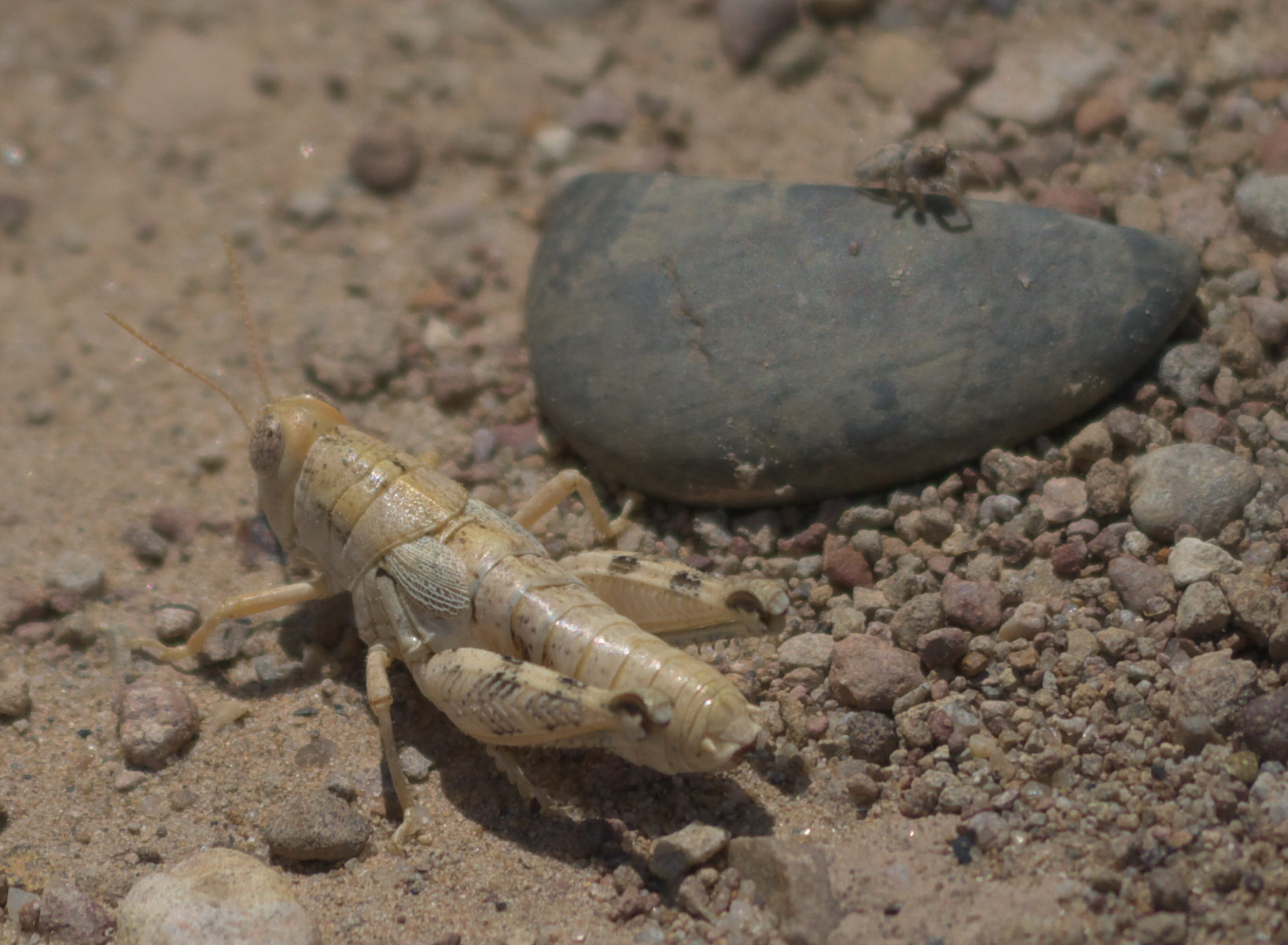

Scientific classification
- Kingdom: Animalia
- Phylum: Arthropoda
- Clade: Pancrustacea
- Class: Insecta
- Order: Orthoptera
- Suborder: Caelifera
- Family: Acrididae
- Tribe: Melanoplini
- Genus: Aeoloplides
- Species: A. chenopodii

Binomial name
- Aeoloplides chenopodii (Bruner, 1894)

= Aeoloplides chenopodii =

Species of grasshopper

Aeoloplides chenopodii, the Colorado plateaus saltbush grasshopper, is a species of spur-throated grasshopper in the family Acrididae. It is found in North America.

== Subspecies ==
These two subspecies belong to the species Aeoloplides chenopodii:

- Aeoloplides chenopodii arcuatus (Rehn, 1902)^{i c g}
- Aeoloplides chenopodii chenopodii (Bruner, 1894)^{i c g}

Data sources: i = ITIS, c = Catalogue of Life, g = GBIF, b = Bugguide.net
