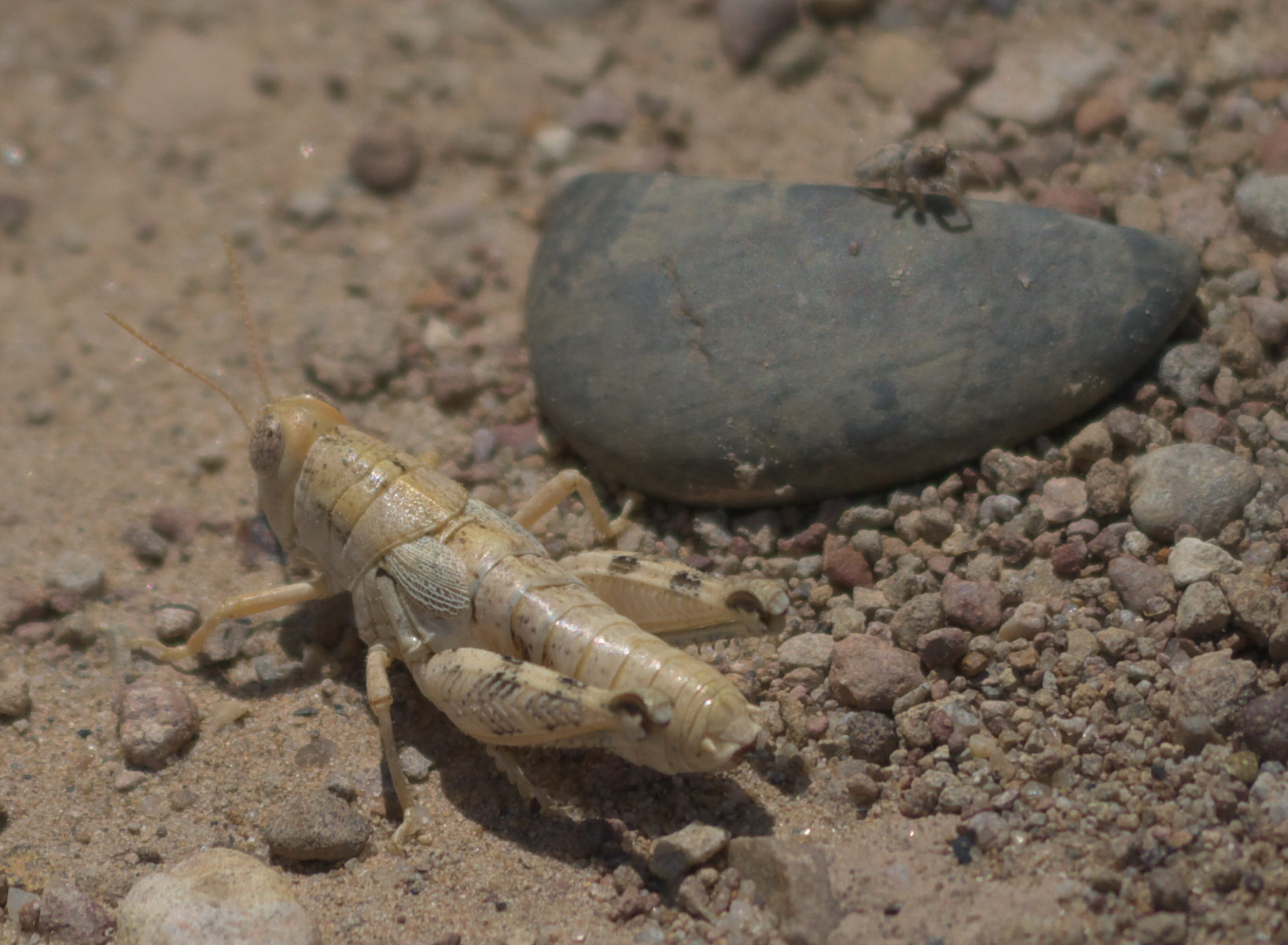
- Aeoloplides chenopodii

Scientific classification
- Kingdom: Animalia
- Phylum: Arthropoda
- Clade: Pancrustacea
- Class: Insecta
- Order: Orthoptera
- Suborder: Caelifera
- Family: Acrididae
- Subfamily: Melanoplinae
- Tribe: Melanoplini
- Genus: Aeoloplides; Caudell, 1915

= Aeoloplides =

Genus of grasshoppers

Aeoloplides is a genus of spur-throated grasshoppers in the family Acrididae. There are about nine described species in Aeoloplides.

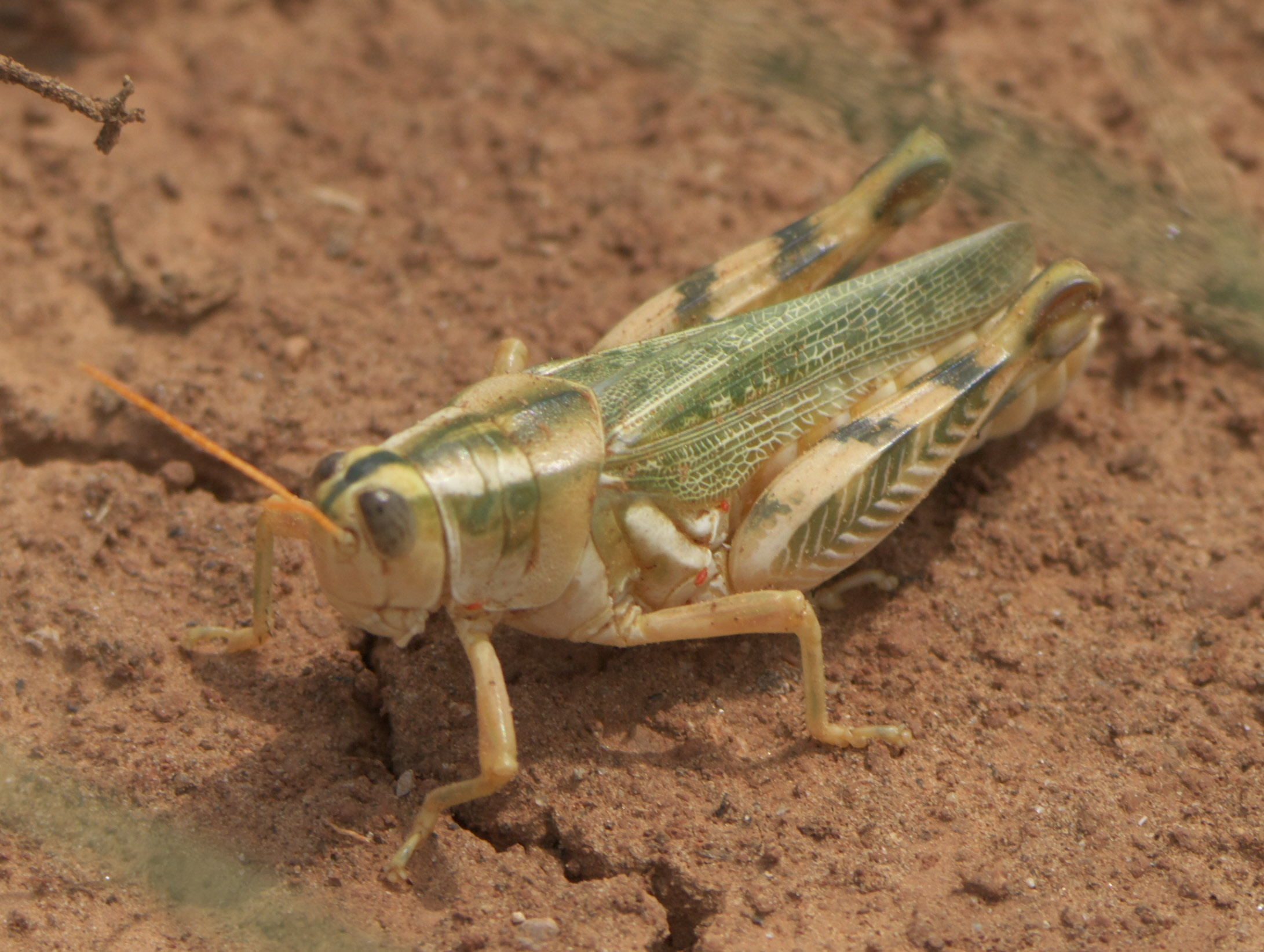
Aeoloplides turnbulli

== Species ==
These nine species belong to the genus Aeoloplides:

- Aeoloplides californicus (Scudder, 1897)^{i c g b} (California saltbush grasshopper)
- Aeoloplides chenopodii (Bruner, 1894)^{i c g b} (Colorado plateaus saltbush grasshopper)
- Aeoloplides elegans (Scudder, 1897)^{i c g b} (elegant saltbush grasshopper)
- Aeoloplides fratercula (Hebard, 1919)^{i c g b} (northern coast bush grasshopper)
- Aeoloplides fuscipes (Scudder, 1897)^{i c g b} (southern coast bush grasshopper)
- Aeoloplides minor (Bruner, 1904)^{i c g b} (little saltbush grasshopper)
- Aeoloplides rotundipennis Wallace, 1955^{i c g b} (Rio Grande saltbush grasshopper)
- Aeoloplides tenuipennis (Scudder, 1897)^{i c g b} (narrow-winged saltbush grasshopper)
- Aeoloplides turnbulli (Thomas, 1872)^{i c g b} (thistle grasshopper)

Data sources: i = ITIS, c = Catalogue of Life, g = GBIF, b = Bugguide.net
