= Ptyssoptera tryphera =

Scientific classification
- Domain: Eukaryota
- Kingdom: Animalia
- Phylum: Arthropoda
- Class: Insecta
- Order: Lepidoptera
- Family: Palaephatidae
- Genus: Ptyssoptera
- Species: P. tryphera

Binomial name
- Ptyssoptera tryphera (Meyrick, 1893)

Synonyms
- Tinea tryphera Meyrick, 1893

Moth species in family Palaephatidae

Ptyssoptera tryphera is a moth of the family Palaephatidae. It is found in the Australian Capital Territory, New South Wales and Queensland.

The larvae feed between silk-joined leaves of their food plant Persoonia levis.
