= Ptyssoptera acrozyga =

Scientific classification
- Kingdom: Animalia
- Phylum: Arthropoda
- Class: Insecta
- Order: Lepidoptera
- Family: Palaephatidae
- Genus: Ptyssoptera
- Species: P. acrozyga

Binomial name
- Ptyssoptera acrozyga (Meyrick, 1893)

Synonyms
- Tinea acrozyga Meyrick, 1893

Moth species in family Palaephatidae

Ptyssoptera acrozyga is a moth of the family Palaephatidae that is found in Western Australia.
