= Azaleodes micronipha =

Scientific classification
- Kingdom: Animalia
- Phylum: Arthropoda
- Clade: Pancrustacea
- Class: Insecta
- Order: Lepidoptera
- Family: Palaephatidae
- Genus: Azaleodes
- Species: A. micronipha

Binomial name
- Azaleodes micronipha Turner, 1923

Moth species in family Palaephatidae

Azaleodes micronipha is a moth of the family Palaephatidae. It is found in Australia from Tamborine Mountain and Lamington National Park in Queensland to Mount Keira and the Barren Grounds Fauna Reserve in New South Wales.
