= Azaleodes brachyceros =

Scientific classification
- Kingdom: Animalia
- Phylum: Arthropoda
- Class: Insecta
- Order: Lepidoptera
- Family: Palaephatidae
- Genus: Azaleodes
- Species: A. brachyceros

Binomial name
- Azaleodes brachyceros Nielsen, 1987

Moth species in family Palaephatidae

Azaleodes brachyceros is a moth of the family Palaephatidae. It is known only from the Upper Allyn River in New South Wales, Australia.
