= Ptyssoptera teleochra =

Scientific classification
- Kingdom: Animalia
- Phylum: Arthropoda
- Class: Insecta
- Order: Lepidoptera
- Family: Palaephatidae
- Genus: Ptyssoptera
- Species: P. teleochra

Binomial name
- Ptyssoptera teleochra (Meyrick, 1893)

Synonyms
- Tinea teleochra Meyrick, 1893

Moth species in family Palaephatidae

Ptyssoptera teleochra is a moth of the family Palaephatidae. It is found in New South Wales, Australia.
