= Ptyssoptera lativittella =

Scientific classification
- Domain: Eukaryota
- Kingdom: Animalia
- Phylum: Arthropoda
- Class: Insecta
- Order: Lepidoptera
- Family: Palaephatidae
- Genus: Ptyssoptera
- Species: P. lativittella

Binomial name
- Ptyssoptera lativittella (Walker, 1864)

Synonyms
- Elachista lativittella Walker, 1864

Moth species in family Palaephatidae

Ptyssoptera lativittella is a moth of the family Palaephatidae that is found in New South Wales, Australia.
