= Azaleodes megaceros =

Scientific classification
- Kingdom: Animalia
- Phylum: Arthropoda
- Class: Insecta
- Order: Lepidoptera
- Family: Palaephatidae
- Genus: Azaleodes
- Species: A. megaceros

Binomial name
- Azaleodes megaceros Nielsen, 1987

Moth species in family Palaephatidae

Azaleodes megaceros is a moth of the family Palaephatidae. It has only been found in Australia at the Dorrigo National Park and localities near Coffs Harbour in New South Wales.
