= Abacetus fuscipes =

Scientific classification
- Domain: Eukaryota
- Kingdom: Animalia
- Phylum: Arthropoda
- Class: Insecta
- Order: Coleoptera
- Suborder: Adephaga
- Family: Carabidae
- Genus: Abacetus
- Species: A. fuscipes

Binomial name
- Abacetus fuscipes (Klug, 1833)

Species of beetle

Abacetus fuscipes is a species of ground beetle in the subfamily Pterostichinae. It was described by Johann Christoph Friedrich Klug in 1833.
