= Ptyssoptera phaeochrysa =

Scientific classification
- Domain: Eukaryota
- Kingdom: Animalia
- Phylum: Arthropoda
- Class: Insecta
- Order: Lepidoptera
- Family: Palaephatidae
- Genus: Ptyssoptera
- Species: P. phaeochrysa

Binomial name
- Ptyssoptera phaeochrysa (Turner, 1926)

Synonyms
- Tinea phaeochrysa Turner, 1926

Moth species in family Palaephatidae

Ptyssoptera phaeochrysa is a moth of the family Palaephatidae. It is found in the Australian states of New South Wales and Queensland.
