= Ptyssoptera tetropa =

Scientific classification
- Kingdom: Animalia
- Phylum: Arthropoda
- Class: Insecta
- Order: Lepidoptera
- Family: Palaephatidae
- Genus: Ptyssoptera
- Species: P. tetropa

Binomial name
- Ptyssoptera tetropa (Meyrick, 1893)

Synonyms
- Tinea tetropa Meyrick, 1893

Moth species in family Palaephatidae

Ptyssoptera tetropa is a moth of the family Palaephatidae. It is found in the Australian states of New South Wales and South Australia.
