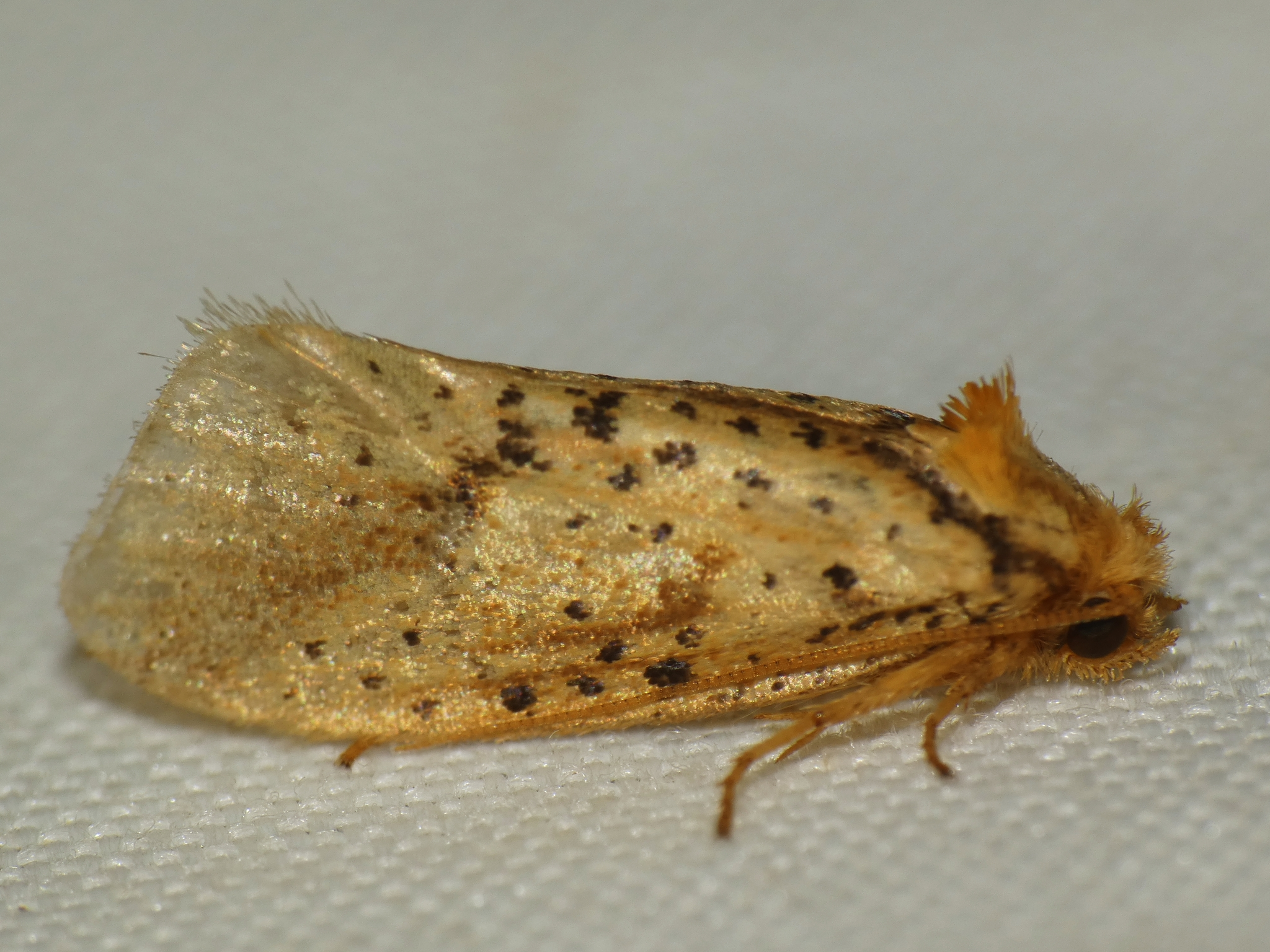

Scientific classification
- Kingdom: Animalia
- Phylum: Arthropoda
- Class: Insecta
- Order: Lepidoptera
- Family: Palaephatidae
- Genus: Azaleodes
- Species: A. fuscipes

Binomial name
- Azaleodes fuscipes Nielsen, 1987

= Azaleodes fuscipes =

Moth species in family Palaephatidae

Azaleodes fuscipes is a moth of the family Palaephatidae. It is found in Australia in Queensland rainforests from Cooktown southwards, nearly to Townsville.
