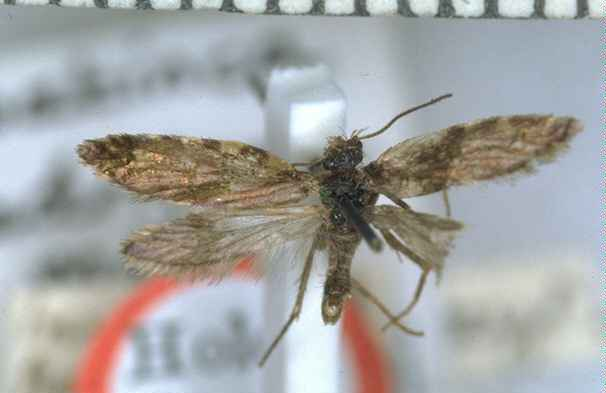

Conservation status
- Data Deficit (NZ TCS)

Scientific classification
- Kingdom: Animalia
- Phylum: Arthropoda
- Clade: Pancrustacea
- Class: Insecta
- Order: Lepidoptera
- Family: Micropterigidae
- Genus: Sabatinca
- Species: S. quadrijuga

Binomial name
- Sabatinca quadrijuga Meyrick, 1912

= Sabatinca quadrijuga =

Species of moth endemic to New Zealand

Sabatinca quadrijuga is a species of moth belonging to the family Micropterigidae. This species is endemic to New Zealand and is found in the Dunedin area and in Southland. The range of S. quadrijuga overlaps with the range of S. caustica. S. quadrijuga was first scientifically described by Edward Meyrick in 1912. As a result of its predominantly black forewings this species looks similar to a small caddisfly. The adults of this species are on the wing from September to November. Larvae feed on leafy liverwort species and the adults likely feed on fern spores or sedge pollen. The species prefers to live in well lit but damp mossy habitats. The nearest relative of S. quadrijuga is S. aurantissima. In 2025 this species was classified as "data deficient" under the New Zealand Threat Classification System.

== Taxonomy ==
This species was first described by Edward Meyrick in 1912 using a specimen collected by Alfred Philpott in Invercargill. In 1928 George Hudson discussed and illustrated this species in his book The butterflies and moths of New Zealand. The holotype specimen is held at the Natural History Museum, London.

== Description ==
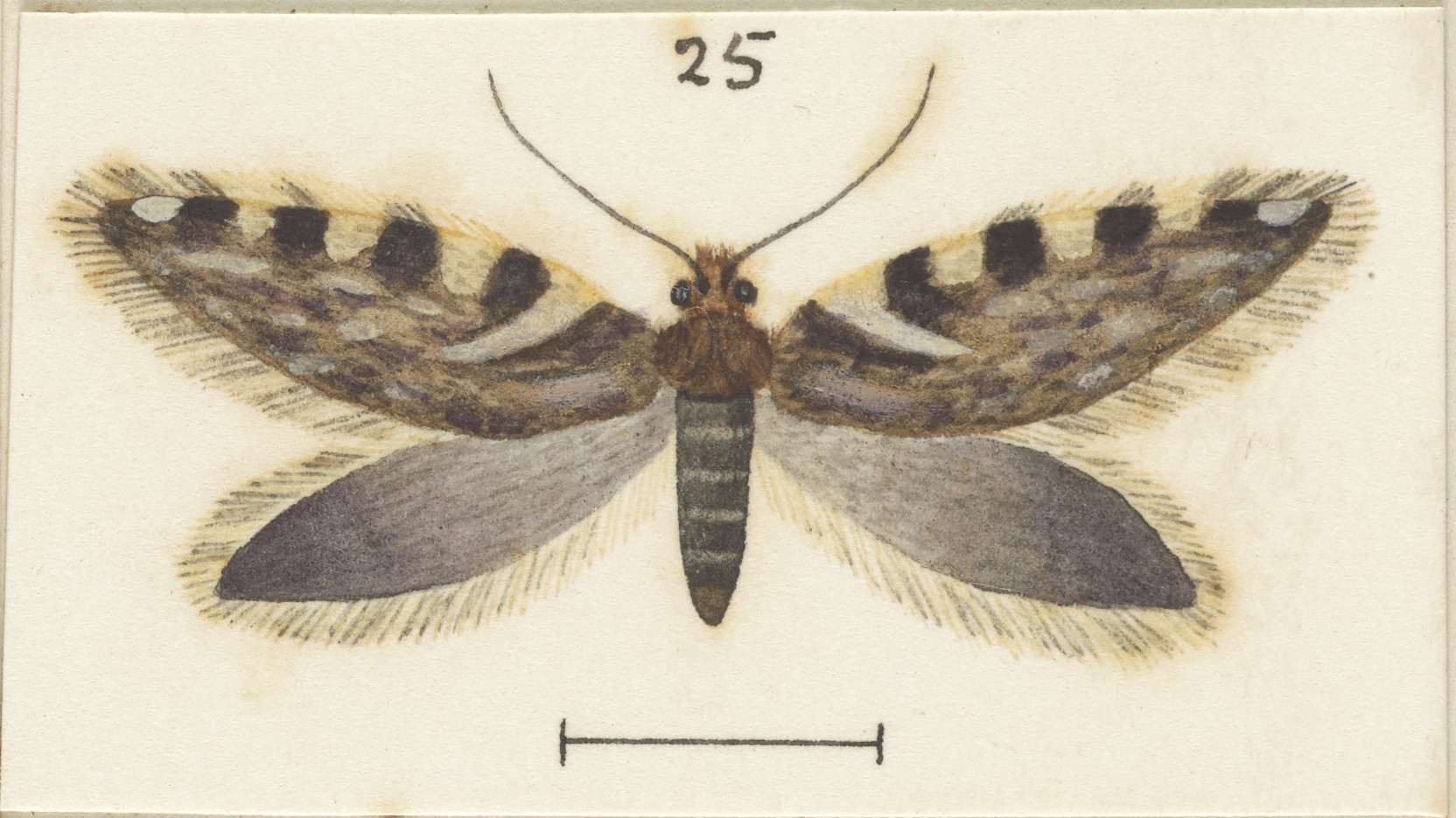
Illustration of S. quadrijuga by George Hudson.

Meyrick described the species as follows:

♂. 13 millimetres (0.51 in). Head pale greyish. Antennae dark fuscous. Thorax purplish. Abdomen grey, lateral claspers and supraanal projection longer and narrower than in caustica. Forewings ovate-lanceolate, less acute than in caustica, stalk of 7 and 8 extremely short; deep purple, irregularly mixed with coppery-golden, darker and bluish on costa; four subquadrate ochreous-whitish spots on costa between base and 3/4, larger anteriorly, and a dot towards apex: cilia grey-whitish, with several dark grey bars. Hindwings violet-grey, darker towards apex; cilia grey-whitish, on costa barred with grey suffusion.

The forewings of S. quadrijuga are predominantly black, and this ensures it looks similar to a small black caddisfly. The nearest relative of S. quadrijuga is S. aurantissima.

== Distribution ==
This species is endemic to New Zealand. It is found in Dunedin area and in Southland. The range of S. quadrijuga overlaps with the range of S. caustica.

== Behaviour ==
The adults of this species are on the wing from September to November.

== Host species and habitat ==
The larvae of this species feeds on foliose liverwort species and the adults likely feed on fern spores or sedge pollen. Adults are known to fly close to the ground and prefer well lit damp mossy habitats. Hudson observed that adults of this species had been seen on bare ground under trees such as Dacrycarpus dacrydioides.

== Conservation status ==
In 2025 this species was classified by the New Zealand Department of Conservation as "data deficient" under the New Zealand Threat Classification System.
