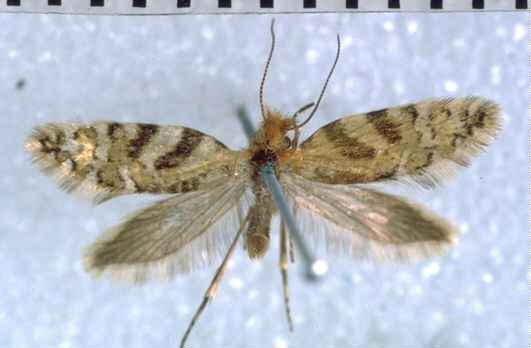
- Holotype specimen

Scientific classification
- Kingdom: Animalia
- Phylum: Arthropoda
- Class: Insecta
- Order: Lepidoptera
- Family: Micropterigidae
- Genus: Sabatinca
- Species: S. aenea

Binomial name
- Sabatinca aenea Hudson, 1923

= Sabatinca aenea =

Species of moth endemic to New Zealand

Sabatinca aenea, also known as the Banks Peninsula Metallic, is a species of moth belonging to the family Micropterigidae. This species was first described by George Hudson in 1923. It is endemic to New Zealand and is found in Kaikōura and in the Canterbury regions. The larvae of this species is a deep grey green colour and likely feeds on foliose liverwort species. The adult moths likely feed on fern spores or sedge pollen. This species prefers moist semi-shaded habitat and the adults are on the wing from the start of October until the middle of December.

== Taxonomy ==
This species was described by George Hudson in 1923 using a specimen collected by Stewart Lindsay at Governor's Bay in Canterbury. Hudson went on to discuss and illustrate the species in his 1928 book The butterflies and moths of New Zealand. The holotype specimen is held at the Museum of New Zealand Te Papa Tongarewa.

== Description ==
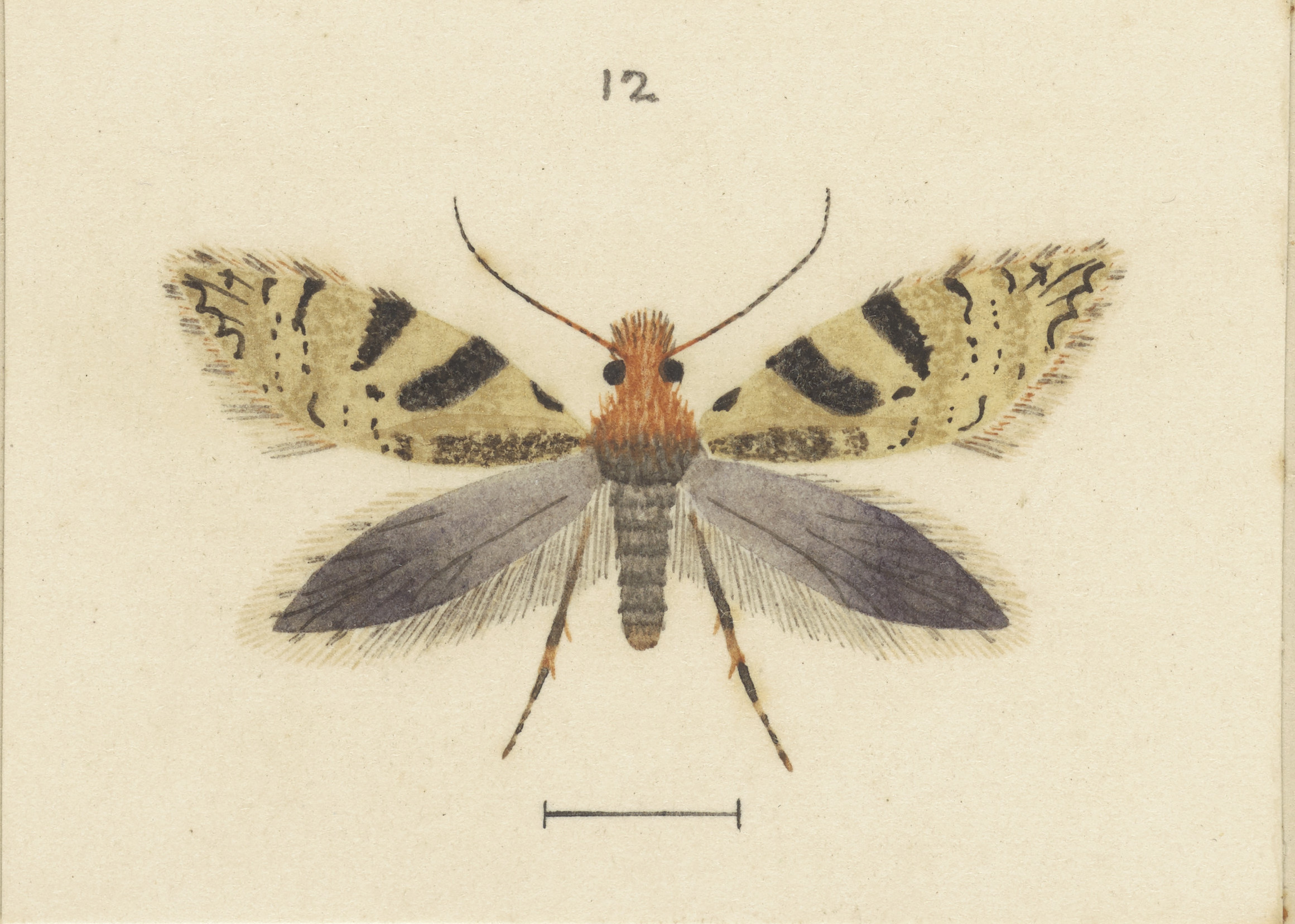
Sabatinca aenea painted by George Hudson

The larvae of this species are darkly grey green in colour and are similar in appearance to the larvae of S. doroxena.

Hudson described the adults of this species as follows:

The expansion of the wings is slightly over 3/8 inch. The head and anterior portions of the thorax are clothed with shaggy rust-coloured hairs. The abdomen is blackish. The legs are black barred with golden-ochreous-brown. The antennae are rather long black, reddish at base. The fore-wings have the costa strongly arched near the base, the apex acute and the termen oblique; pale golden-ochreous with black markings; a small blotch on costa at base; a broad strongly-curved band extending from costa at 1/4 half way to tornus; a second band shorter and straighter, from costa before middle to disk; a short, much narrower band from costa beyond middle; a series of slender blackish markings around outer third of costa, termen, and in disk beyond middle; a broad cloudy blackish patch on dorsum, extending half way from base to tornus; between the black markings much of the ground colour has faint whitish reflections which tend to form pale transverse bands; the cilia are golden-ochreous with blackish bars. The hindwings are dark grey with strong purple reflections; the cilia are pale golden-ochreous, becoming blackish near the body.

The forewing patterns of this species are variable but can be similar to S. aurella.

== Distribution ==
This species is endemic to New Zealand. It is found in the Kaikōura and the Canterbury districts.

== Behaviour ==
Adult moths are on the wing from the start of October until the middle of December.

== Host species and habitat ==
The larvae of this species likely feed on foliose liverwort species with the adults likely feeding on fern spores or sedge pollen. Both the larvae and adults prefer damp semi-shaded habitat.
