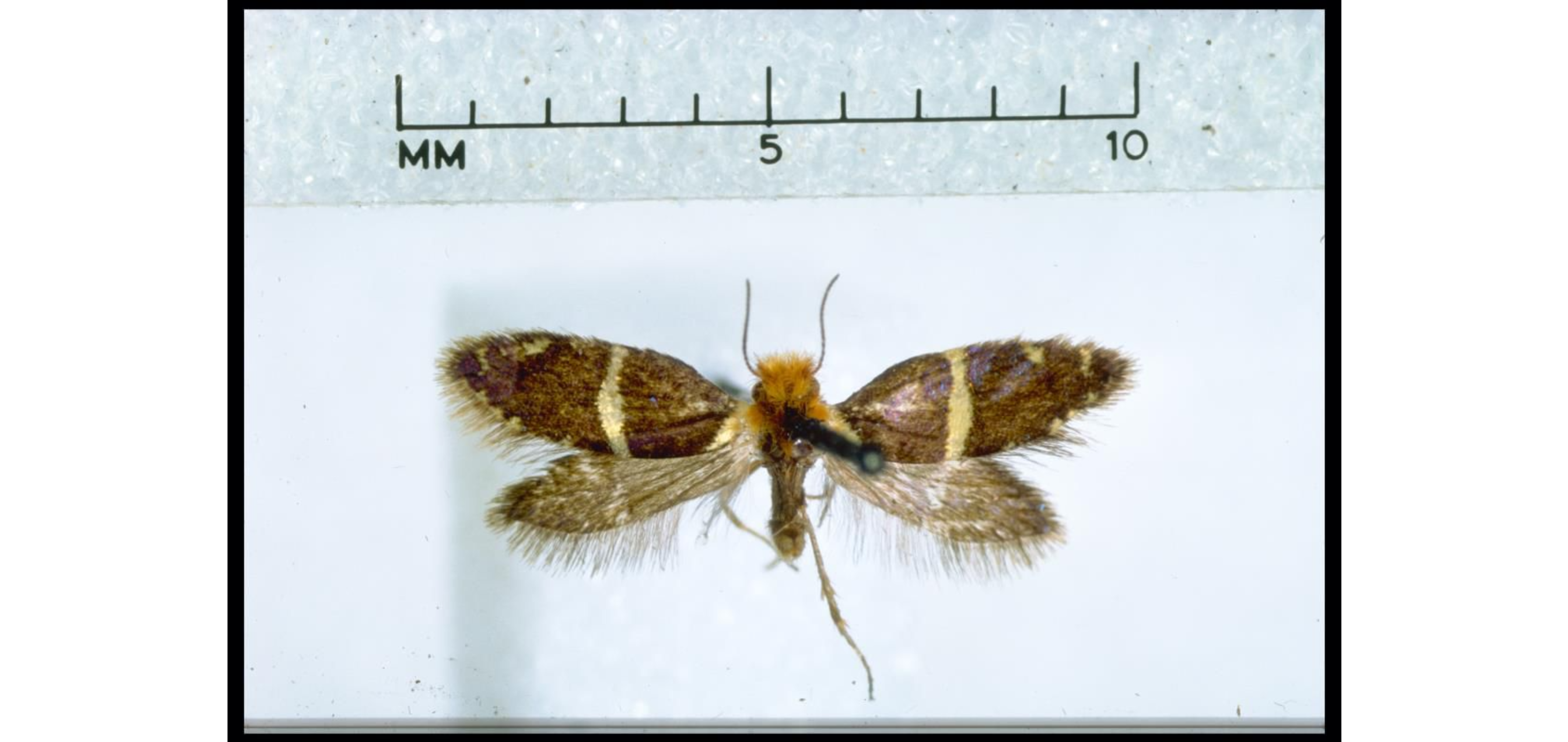
- Holotype

Scientific classification
- Kingdom: Animalia
- Phylum: Arthropoda
- Class: Insecta
- Order: Lepidoptera
- Family: Micropterigidae
- Genus: Sabatinca
- Species: S. ianthina

Binomial name
- Sabatinca ianthina Philpott, 1921

= Sabatinca ianthina =

Species of moth

Sabatinca ianthina is a species of moth belonging to the family Micropterigidae. It was described by Alfred Philpott in 1921. It is endemic to New Zealand. This species can be found on both the North and the South Islands from the Hawkes Bay down to Westland. The adults of this species are on the wing from the end of September until the middle of December. Although this species resembles Zealandopterix zonodoxa, S. ianthina is a larger moth and the range of the two species only overlaps in White Pine Bush Scenic Reserve in the Hawke's Bay.

== Taxonomy ==
This species was described by Alfred Philpott in 1921 from specimens collected at Dun Mountain near Nelson. Adults were found on a rocky slope covered with various species of mosses and liverworts. They were resting on Gahnia species, although it seems this species does not have any closer affinities to this plant. The holotype specimen is held at the New Zealand Arthropod Collection.

== Description ==
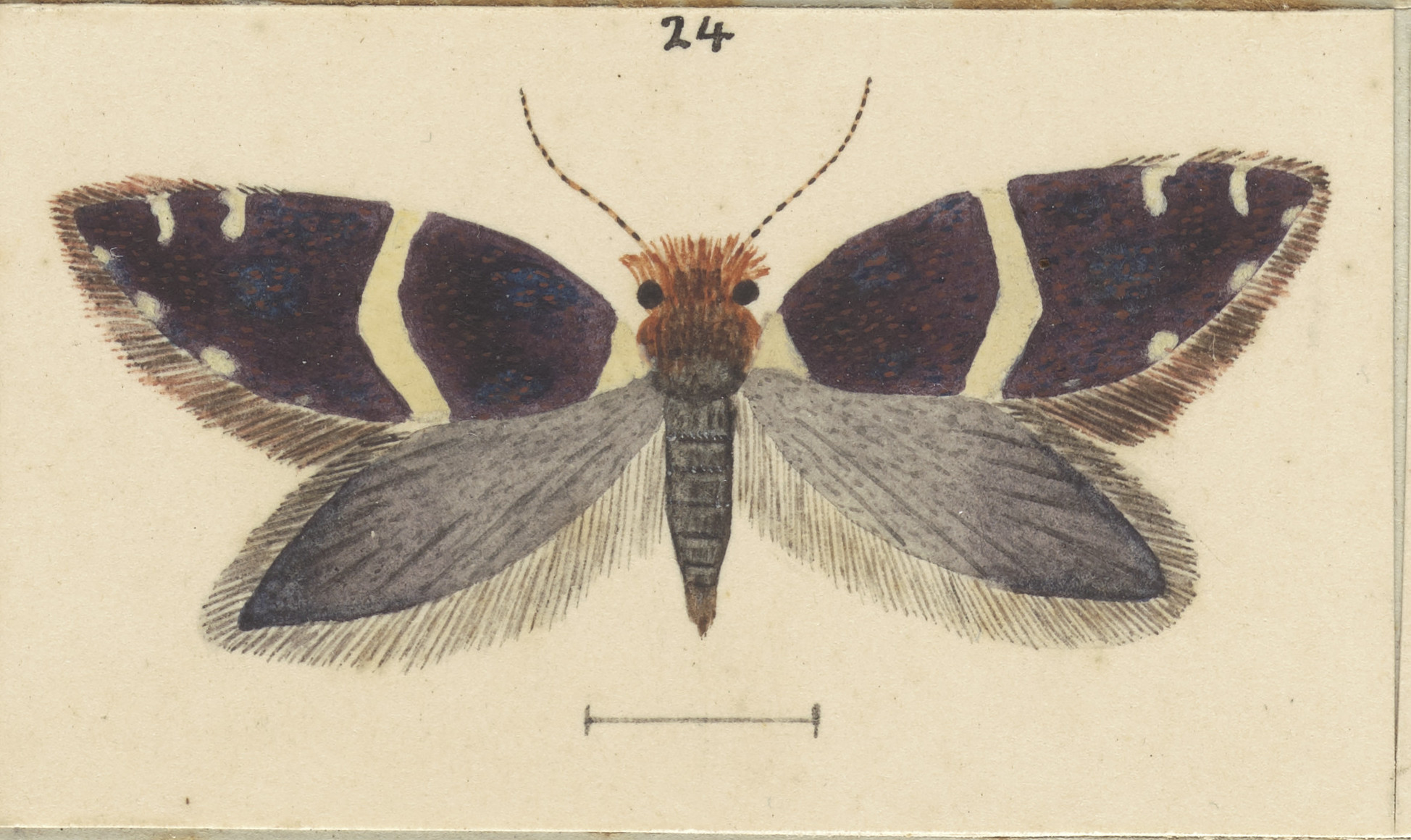
S. ianthina illustrated by George Hudson

Larvae associated this species have yet to be collected.

Philpott described this species as follows:

♂♀. 9–10.5 millimetres (0.35–0.41 in). Head clothed with long bright ochreous hair. Antennae blackish, annulated with ochreous on basal half. Thorax ochreous mixed with black. Abdomen black, sparsely clothed with whitish-ochreous hair. Legs fuscous, tarsi annulated with ochreous. Forewings broadly lanceolate, apex less acute in; dark metallic violet; a band of pale lemon-yellow at base; a lemon-yellow band before 1/2, faintly excurved, and dilated slightly on dorsal half; a variable series of lemon-yellow dots on costa between median band and apex, and a similar series on dorsum, usually two in each case but sometimes four or five: cilia greyish-fuscous. Hindwings dark metallic violet, fuscous basally: cilia as in forewings.

Although this species resembles Zealandopterix zonodoxa, S. ianthina is a larger moth and the range of the two species only overlaps in White Pine Bush Scenic Reserve in the Hawke's Bay.

== Distribution ==
This species is endemic to New Zealand. This species can be found on both the North and the South Islands from the Hawkes Bay down to Westland from altitudes ranging from sea level up to 1400 m.

== Behaviour ==
The adults of this species are on the wing from the end of September until the middle of December.

== Host species ==
The larvae of this species likely feed on foliose liverwort species with the adults likely feeding on fern spores or sedge pollen.
