= Weheka =

Weheka may refer to:

- Cook River / Weheka, a river in West Coast Region, New Zealand
- Weheka, (Māori: Weheka), the original name for the town of Fox Glacier, New Zealand
- Sabatinca weheka, a species of moth native to New Zealand
