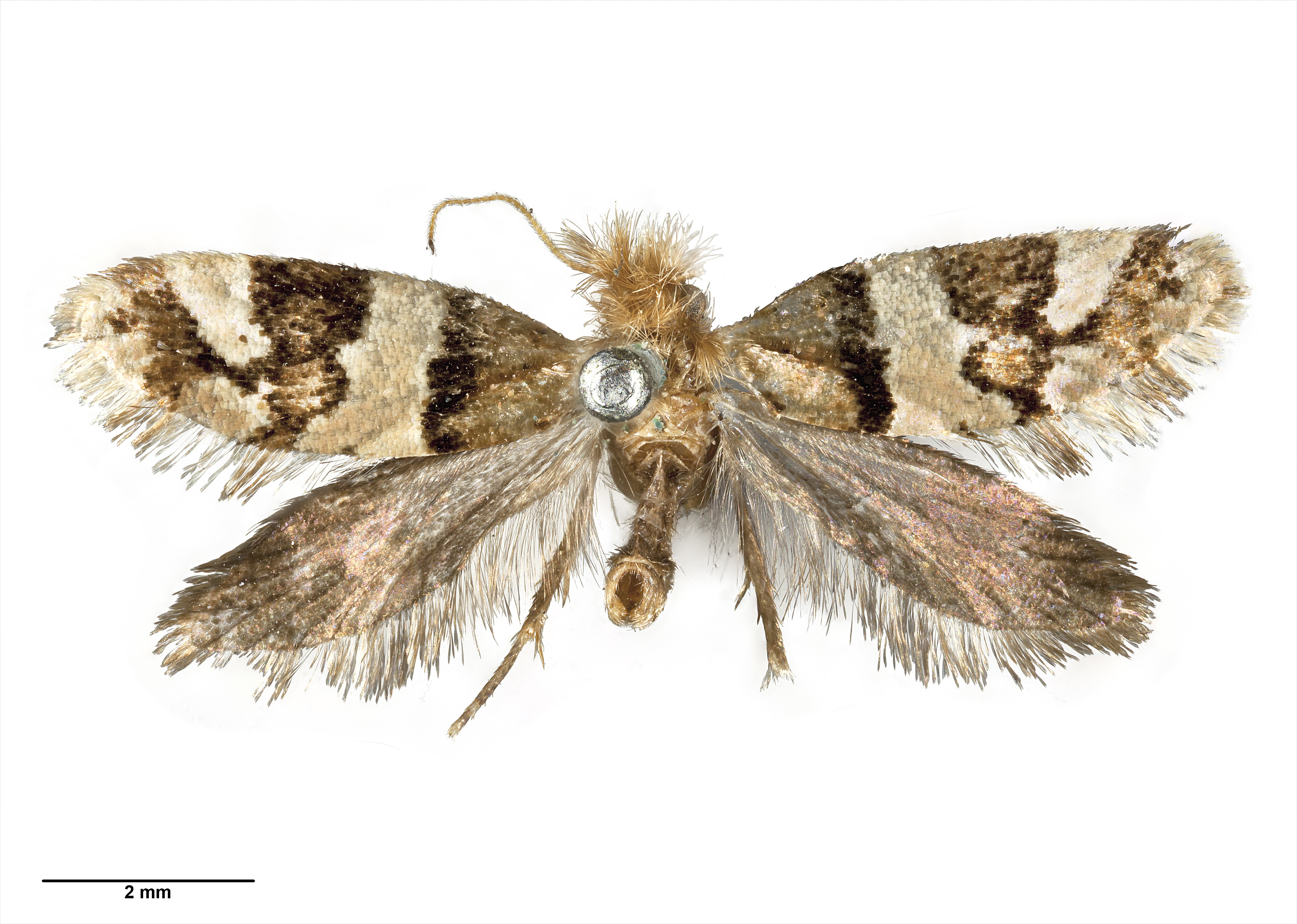

Scientific classification
- Kingdom: Animalia
- Phylum: Arthropoda
- Class: Insecta
- Order: Lepidoptera
- Family: Micropterigidae
- Genus: Sabatinca
- Species: S. lucilia

Binomial name
- Sabatinca lucilia Clarke, 1920

= Sabatinca lucilia =

Species of moth

Sabatinca lucilia is a species of moth in the family Micropterigidae. It is endemic to New Zealand and is found in the top half of the North Island. The adults of this species are on the wing from the end of November until the beginning of March. The larvae of this species likely feed on foliose liverwort species with the adults likely feeding on fern spores or sedge pollen. Adults have been found on a sunny moss-covered clay bank. The species can be found in multiple forest types such as kauri, kanuka and Nothofagus and prefers to inhabit damp fern covered banks

== Taxonomy ==
This species was described by Charles Edwin Clarke in 1920 using a specimen collected via electric light at Waitomo Hotel and another collected at Kauri Gully in Auckland. The latter specimen was designated by George Gibbs as the lectotype specimen and is held at the Auckland War Memorial Museum.

== Description ==
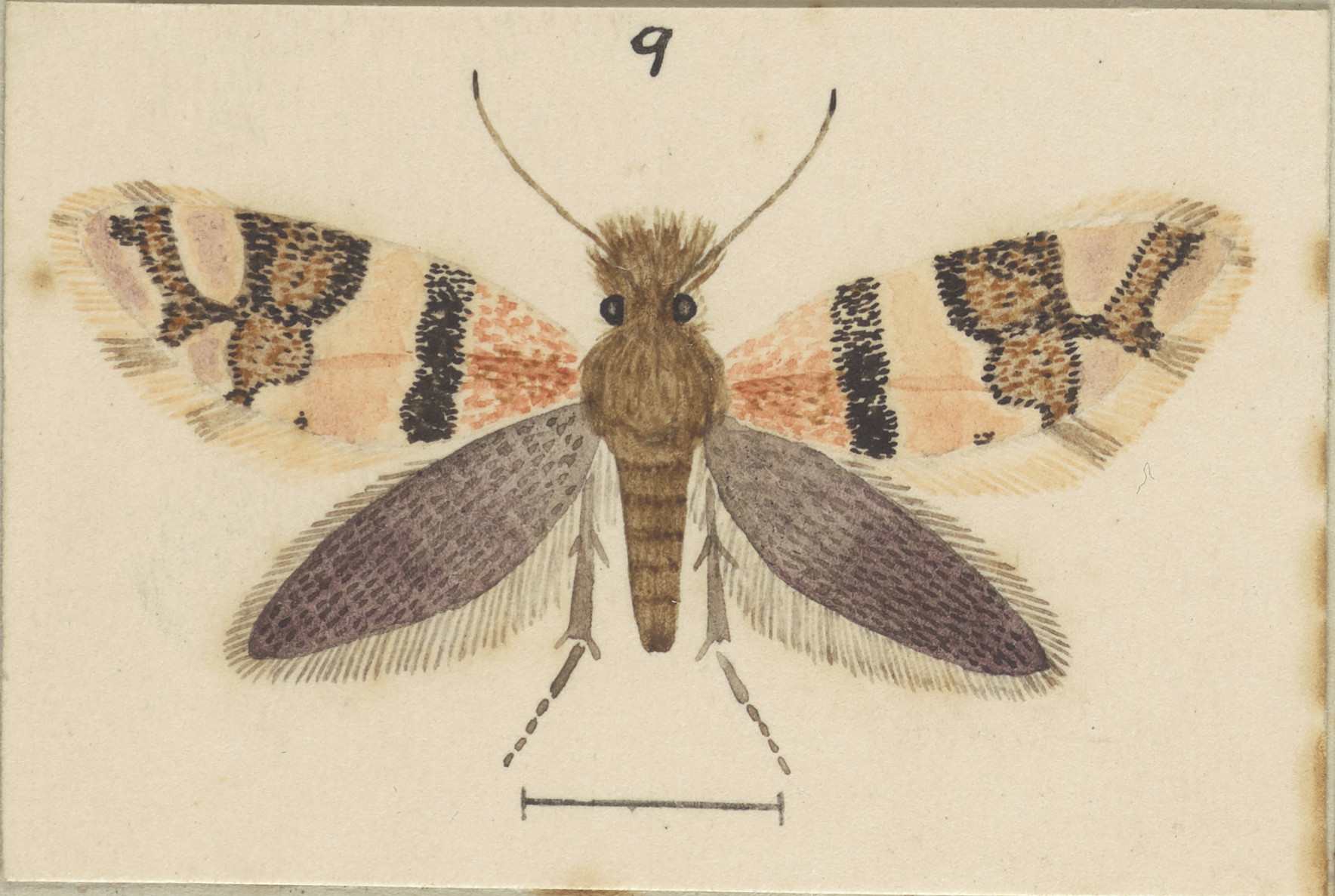
S. lucilia, illustrated by George Hudson

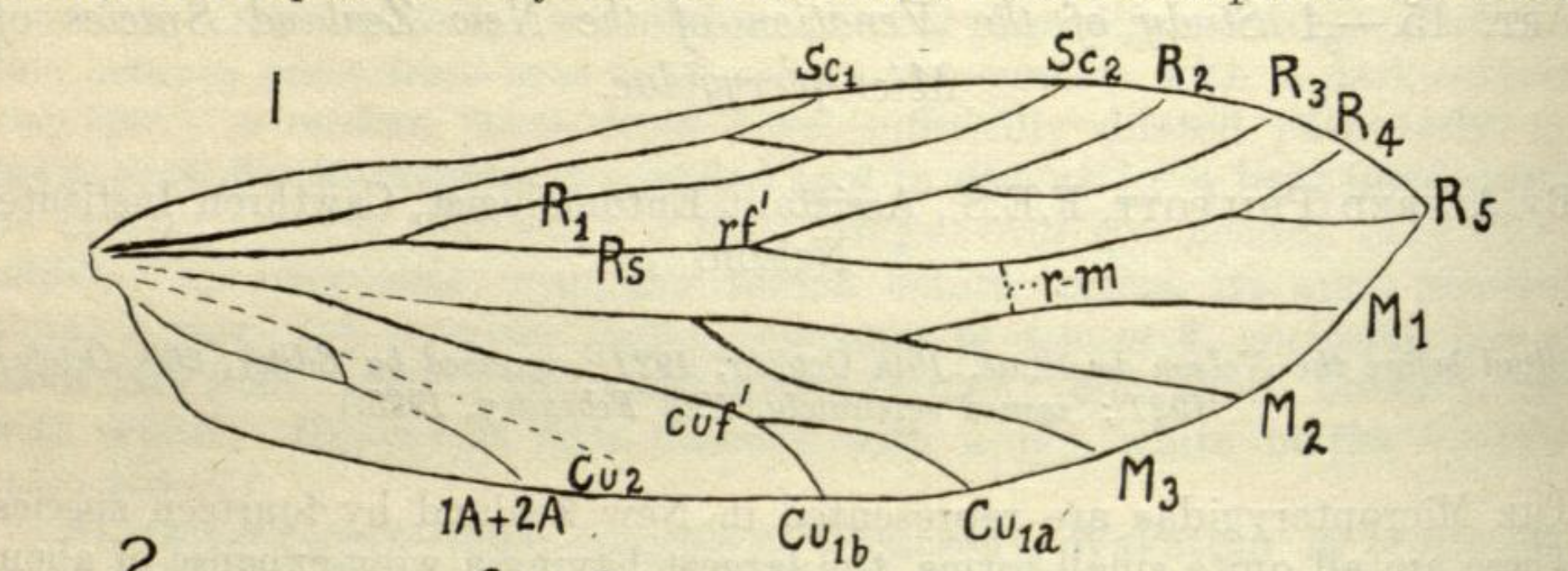
Hindwing venation of Sabatinca lucilia

Clarke described the species as follows:

12 mm. Head, face, and palpi covered with long bronze-brown hair. Antennae purplish tending to brown at tips. Thorax brown, densely covered with long brown hair. Abdomen grey-blackish along sides. Legs ochreous tinged with grey-blackish. Forewings ovate-lanceolate, costa bent abruptly near base, arched, apex less acute than in incongruella; basal area to nearly 1/3 ochreous suffused with ruby banded by abrupt black transverse line; an ochreous-grey band slightly suffused with ruby reaching to nearly 1/2, widening on dorsum; a dark fascia bordered blackish-grey, constricted both sides at middle and narrowed on anal margin; at 2/3 another light grey band slightly tinged with orange but broken in centre by longitudinal blackish stripe; a transverse blackish-bordered ochreus band, beyond which to apex light grey slightly tinged with orange; cilia ochreous with dark-greyish-brown bars in continuation of the dark markings on the wings. Hindwings dark grey suffused with violet, brighter towards apex; cilia dark grey with a few orange hairs.

In 1923 Alfred Philpott studied the wing venation of species within the Sabatinca genus and split the species in the genus into three groups. One of the groups contained S. lucilia and S. calliarcha.

== Distribution ==
This species is endemic to New Zealand. This species is found in the top half of the North Island.

== Behaviour ==
The adults of this species are on the wing from the end of November until the beginning of March.

== Hosts and habitat ==
The larvae of this species likely feed on foliose liverwort species with the adults likely feeding on fern spores or sedge pollen. Adults have been found on a sunny moss-covered clay bank. The species can be found in multiple forest types such as kauri, kanuka and Nothofagus and prefers to inhabit damp fern covered banks.
