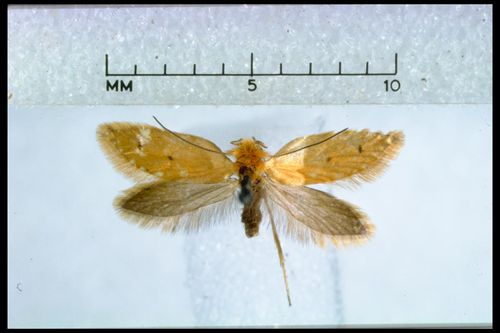

Scientific classification
- Kingdom: Animalia
- Phylum: Arthropoda
- Class: Insecta
- Order: Lepidoptera
- Family: Micropterigidae
- Genus: Sabatinca
- Species: S. aemula

Binomial name
- Sabatinca aemula Philpott, 1924

Synonyms
- Sabatinca aurantiaca Philpott, 1924

= Sabatinca aemula =

Species of moth

Sabatinca aemula is a species of moth belonging to the family Micropterigidae. It is endemic to New Zealand and is found in the north western parts of the South Island. The larvae of this species has yet to be collected but it has been hypothesised that the larvae subsist on foliose liverworts similar to other species in the Sabatinca genus. The adults of the species are on the wing from the middle of September until the end of December. The adults of S. aemula are very similar in appearance to S. chrysargyra and it has been argued they can only be distinguished by dissection. However more recent research suggests that the colour patterns on the forewings of the two species can be sufficient to distinguish between the two species.

== Taxonomy ==
This species was described by Alfred Philpott in 1924. He used specimens collected in the Cobb Valley, in December amongst rough herbage and undergrowth at a damp spot on the edge of the forest. The male holotype specimen is held in the New Zealand Arthropod Collection. In 2014 Gibbs synonymised S. aurantiaca as a junior synonym of S. aemula stating that further collecting of specimens revealed a continuous series of colour form removed the justification for S. aurantiaca.

== Description ==
The larvae of this species are yet to be collected.

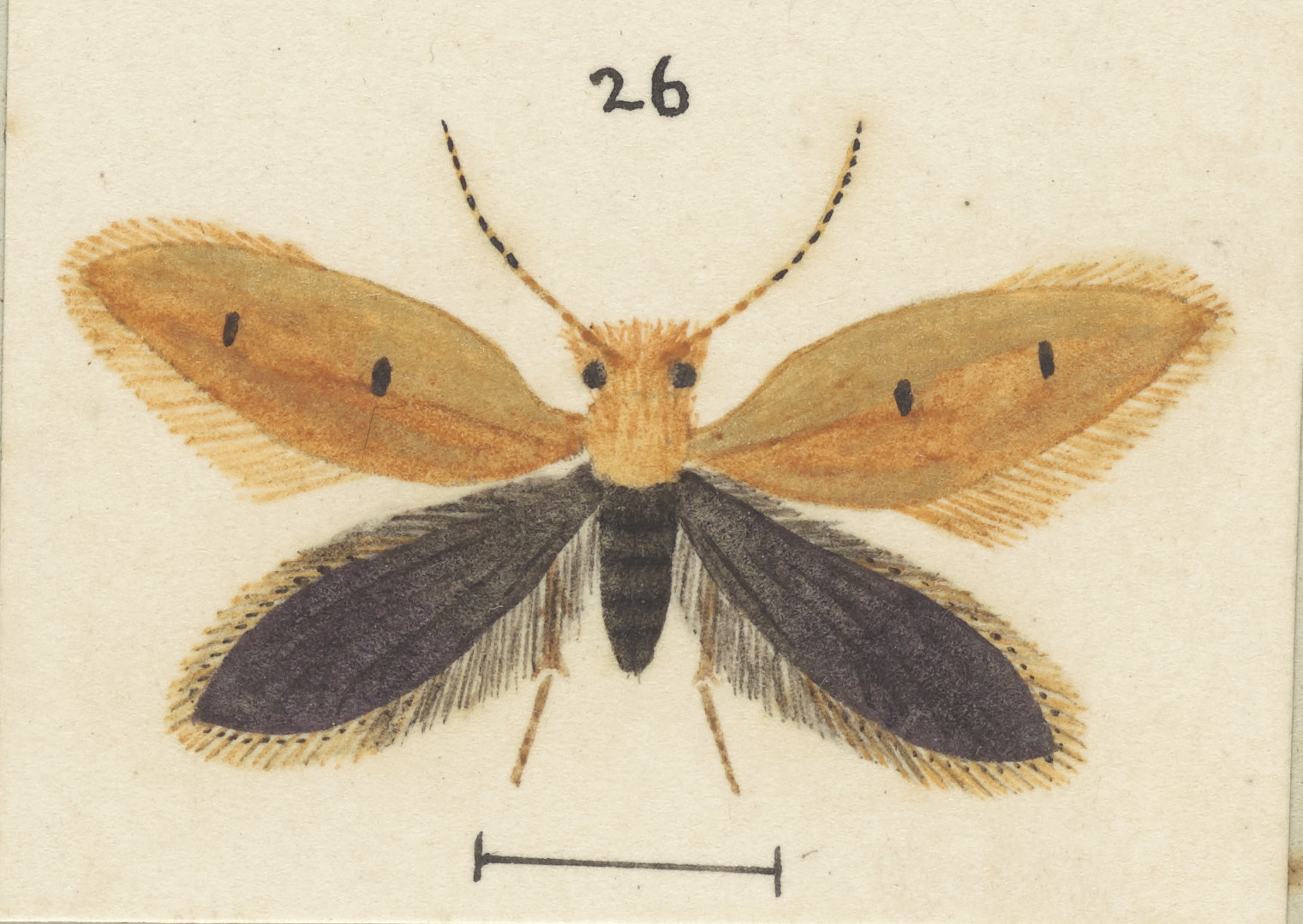
Sabatinca aemula by George Hudson

Philpott described the adults of the species as follows:

♂♀. 11-12mm. Head and thorax reddish-ochreous. Palpi ochreous. Antennae dark fuscous, basal fifth (in ♀ basal third) ochreous. Abdomen greyish-fuscous. Legs ochreous, last tarsal segments fuscous. Forewings ovate-lanceolate, costa strongly arched basally, apex acute, termen very oblique, slightly sinuate; shining ochreous, darker on apical half and above dorsum at base; a silvery-white fascia from costa at middle; irregular and variable in shape, sometimes spot-like, sometimes reaching middle of wing where it touches an irregular black spot; a similar but usually broader fascia at 3/4, also connecting with a black (generally transverse) spot; sometimes a silvery-white dot or dots between second fascia and apex; a series of silvery-white spots round termen: fringes reddish-ochreous with a very obscure dark basal line. Hindwings fuscous-violet: fringes, fuscous on basal half of dorsum, ochreous with a fuscous basal line on remainder of wing.

This species is very similar in appearance to Sabatinca chrysargyra and the two are arguably indistinguishable in the field. Dissection of genitalia has been claimed as being required to distinguish between the two species. However more recently it has been suggested that the forewing patterns of S. chrysargyra is sufficiently different to enable the two species to be distinguished. Sandra R. Schachat and Richard L. Brown have stated that

The wing pattern of Sabatinca chrysargyra is broadly similar to that of S. aemula in terms of the positioning of pattern elements relative to veins along the costa, but contains spots of varying sizes instead of any discernible fasciae. In Sabatinca chrysargyra, unlike S. aurella and S. aemula, the darkest pattern elements are spots and do not occur adjacent to the lightest pattern elements.

Both species are on the wing during the same time period in the year and are found in very close localities with S. aemula being found in the north west parts of the Tasman region north of Mount Hercules where as S. chrysargyra inhabits the Franz Josef valley southwards.

== Distribution ==
This species is endemic to New Zealand and is known from the Mount Arthur tableland in New Zealand. The species can be found in the Nelson, Marlborough, Buller and Westland areas. It can be found at altitudes ranging from 1100 m down to sea-level.

== Behaviour ==
This species is on the wing from the middle of September until the end of December and is a day flying moth.

== Host species and habitat ==
It has been hypothesised that the larvae of this species feed on foliose liverworts as is the case for other species in the Sabatinca genus. The host species of the adult moths has not yet been recorded. Adults have been found in habitats that have good light but are damp and humid.
