= Sabatinca bimacula =

Conservation status
- Naturally Uncommon (NZ TCS)

Scientific classification
- Kingdom: Animalia
- Phylum: Arthropoda
- Class: Insecta
- Order: Lepidoptera
- Family: Micropterigidae
- Genus: Sabatinca
- Species: S. bimacula

Binomial name
- Sabatinca bimacula Gibbs, 2014

Species of moth endemic to New Zealand

Sabatinca bimacula is a species of moth belonging to the family Micropterigidae. This species is endemic to New Zealand and has only been found in the Percy Valley and on Secretary Island in Fiordland. This species is sexually dimorphic with the male of the species having an L-shaped marking on the forewing while in the female the L-shaped marking is much broader and takes up most of the half of the forewing nearest the abdomen. The adults of this species are on the wing in the second half of October. Larvae of this species feed on the liverwort Bazzania involuta. The host species of adult S. bimacula are unknown but are likely to be fern spores or pollen from Sedge grasses. As at 2017 S. bimacula has been classified as having the "At Risk, Naturally Uncommon" conservation status under the New Zealand Threat Classification System.

== Taxonomy ==
This species was described by George Gibbs in 2014. The male holotype specimen was collected in Percy Valley, Fiordland and is held in the New Zealand Arthropod Collection.

== Description ==
Gibbs described the adults of this species as follows:

iridescent purple species, with silvery-white fasciae dominated by a basal L-shaped marking along anal margin and across full width of forewing at about mid-length.

This species is sexually dimorphic with the male of the species having an L-shaped marking on the forewing while in the female the L-shaped marking is much broader and takes up most of the half of the forewing nearest the abdomen.

== Distribution ==
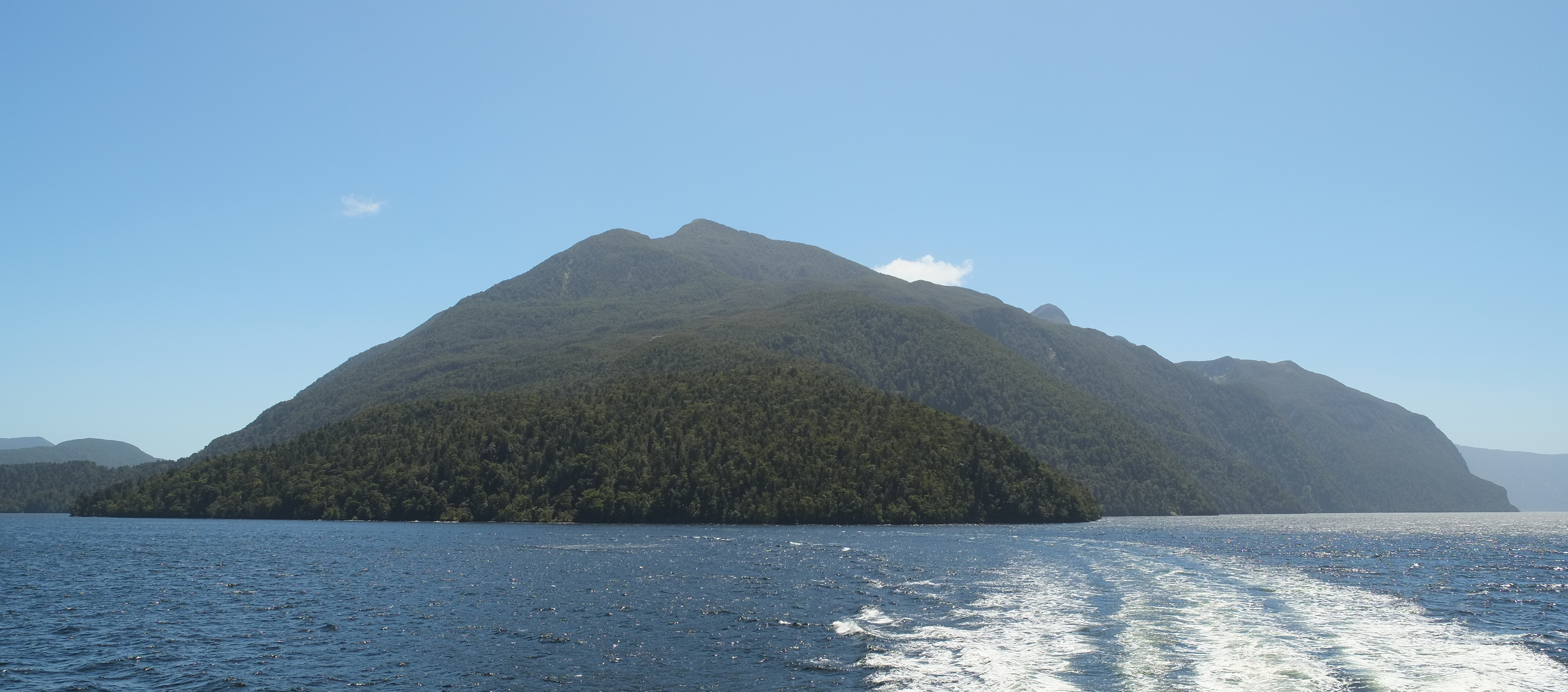
Secretary Island, one of the known locations of S. bimacula.

This species has only been found in the Percy Valley and on Secretary Island, both locations in Fiordland. It has been hypothesised that the species may well occur more widely throughout Fiordland but that it is likely very local in its occurrence.

== Behaviour ==
This species has only been recorded as being on the wing from the middle to the end of October.

== Host species ==
The larvae of S. bimacula lives on Bazzania involuta. The host species of adult S. bimacula are unknown but are likely to be fern spores or pollen from Sedge grasses.

== Conservation status ==
S. bimacula has been classified as having the "At Risk, Naturally Uncommon" conservation status under the New Zealand Threat Classification System.
