= Sabatinca aurantissima =

Scientific classification
- Kingdom: Animalia
- Phylum: Arthropoda
- Class: Insecta
- Order: Lepidoptera
- Family: Micropterigidae
- Genus: Sabatinca
- Species: S. aurantissima

Binomial name
- Sabatinca aurantissima Gibbs, 2014

Species of moth endemic to New Zealand

Sabatinca aurantissima is a species of moth belonging to the family Micropterigidae. This species is endemic to New Zealand and is found in the Nelson and Buller regions close to the coast and at lower altitudes. In appearance, the larvae has a distinctive pinkish-brown colour and at maturity can reach 8 mm in length. The adults are larger than many endemic species within the Sabatinca genus and have forewings that are highly reflective. These two features ensures it can be distinguished from S. aurella, a related species that is similar in appearance. The larvae feed on bryophytes.

== Taxonomy ==
This species was first described by George Gibbs in 2014. The holotype specimen was collected by Gibbs on the Pororari River track in September and is held in the New Zealand Arthropod Collection.

== Description ==
The larvae of this species is coloured a distinctive pinkish-brown and at maturity is 8mm long. Gibbs describes the adult of this species as follows:

A large golden iridescent species with five transverse fasciae on forewing; the basal two magenta, the distal three highly reflective, appearing as if convex above the wing surface.

The wingspan of this moth is approximately 12 to 13mm and is larger in size than many of the other New Zealand endemic species in the Sabatinca genus. This species can be confused with S. aurella but is larger in size and its forewings are more obviously reflective.

== Distribution ==
S. aurantissima is endemic to New Zealand. This species has only been found in the Nelson and Buller regions relatively close to the coast and at lower altitudes.

== Behaviour ==
Mature larvae have been found during the month of May but have not been discovered during the winter months in New Zealand. This has led to the hypothesis that pupation occurs during or after May. Adults are more frequently seen in September.

== Host species and habitat ==
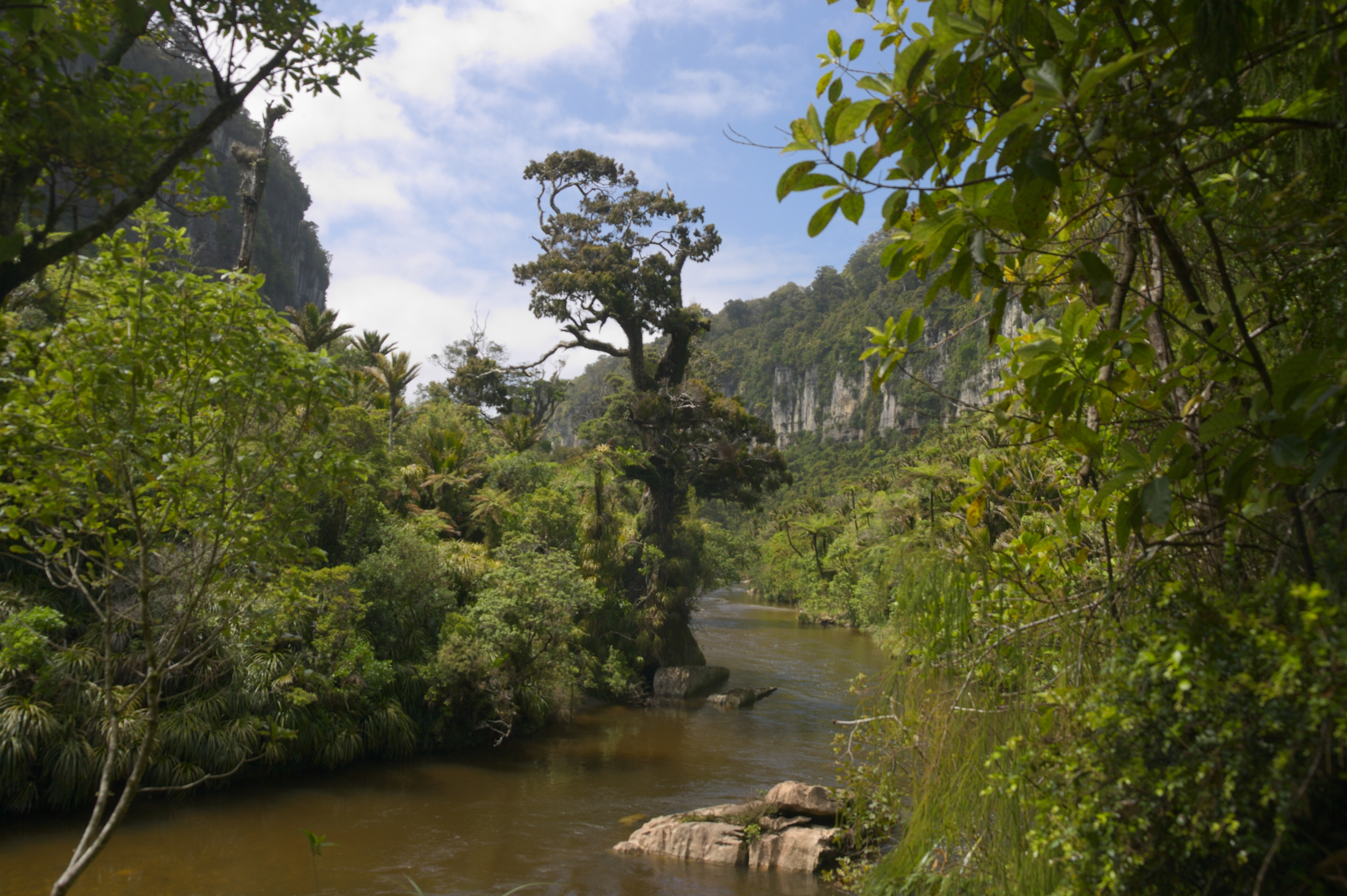
Pororari River, the type locality of this species

The larvae of S. aurantissima feed on bryophytes but the specific host plant is unknown.
