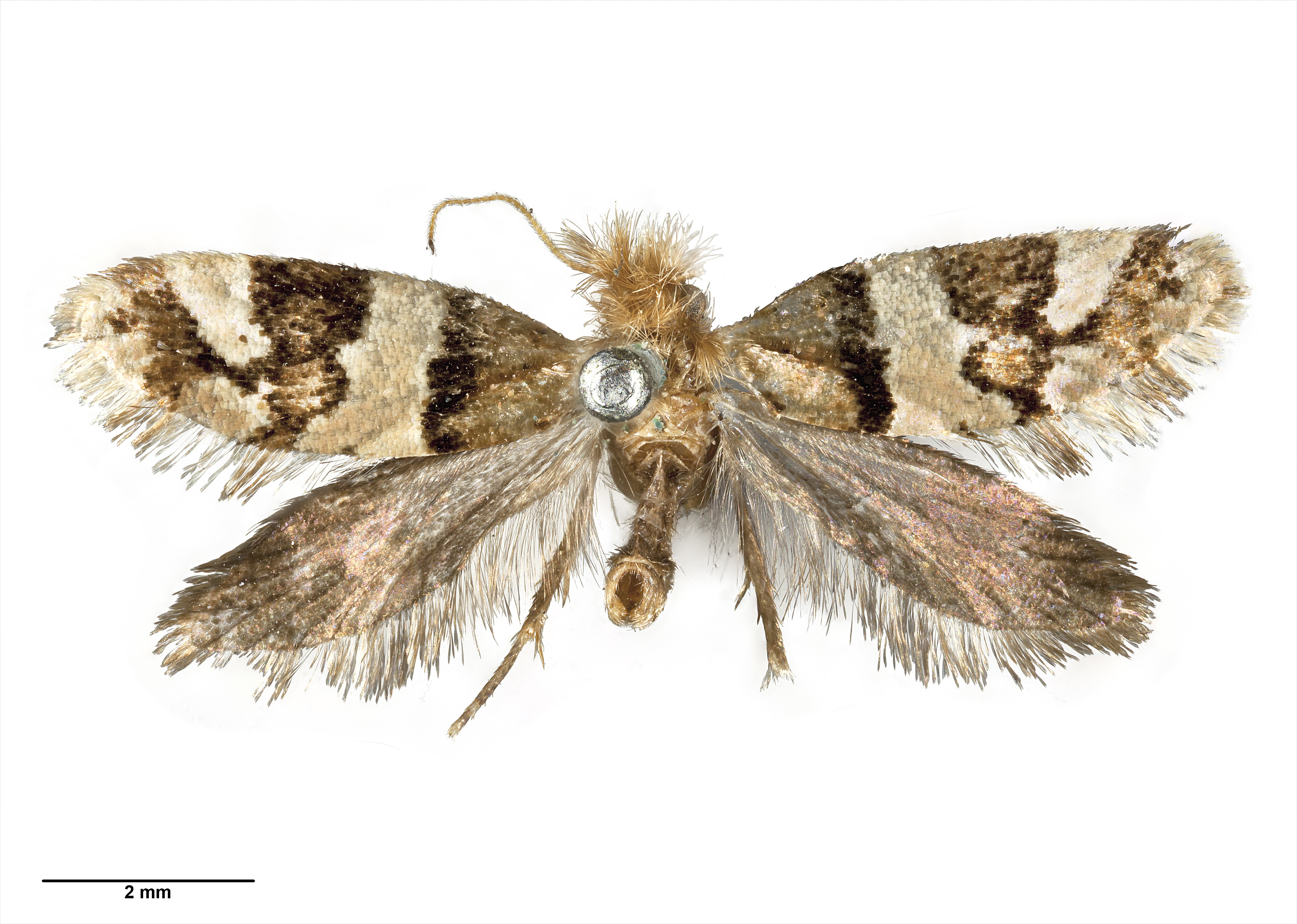
- Sabatinca lucilia

Scientific classification
- Kingdom: Animalia
- Phylum: Arthropoda
- Class: Insecta
- Order: Lepidoptera
- Family: Micropterigidae
- Genus: Sabatinca; Walker, 1863

Species
- see text.

Synonyms
- Palaeomicra Meyrick, 1885; Micropardalis Meyrick, 1912

= Sabatinca =

Sabatinca Temporal range: Cenomanian–Present

Genus of moths in family Micropterigidae

Sabatinca is a genus of small primitive metallic moths in the family Micropterigidae. Palaeomicra and Micropardalis were both established as subgenera of Sabatinca, but were both raised to generic level by Joël Minet in 1985. However, in 2014 both these genera, Palaeomicra and Micropardalis, were recognised by George Gibbs as synonyms of Sabatinca. Extinct species in this genus are known from the Cretaceous Burmese amber.

== Selected species ==
- Sabatinca aemula Philpott, 1924
- Sabatinca aenea Hudson, 1923
- Sabatinca aurantissima Gibbs, 2014
- Sabatinca aurella Hudson, 1918
- Sabatinca bimacula Gibbs, 2014
- Sabatinca calliarcha Meyrick, 1912
- Sabatinca caustica Meyrick, 1912
- Sabatinca chalcophanes (Meyrick, 1885)
- Sabatinca chrysargyra (Meyrick, 1885)
- Sabatinca delobelli Viette, 1978
- Sabatinca demissa Philpott, 1923
- Sabatinca doroxena (Meyrick, 1888)
- Sabatinca heighwayi Philpott, 1927
- Sabatinca ianthina Philpott, 1921
- Sabatinca incongruella Walker, 1863
- Sabatinca lucilia Clarke, 1920
- †Sabatinca perveta (Cockerell, 1919)
- Sabatinca pluvialis Gibbs, 2014
- Sabatinca quadrijuga Meyrick, 1912
- Sabatinca weheka Gibbs, 2014
- †Sabatinca pouilloni Ngô -Muller et al., 2020
