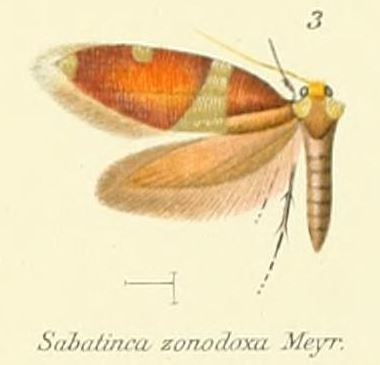

Scientific classification
- Domain: Eukaryota
- Kingdom: Animalia
- Phylum: Arthropoda
- Class: Insecta
- Order: Lepidoptera
- Family: Micropterigidae
- Genus: Zealandopterix; Gibbs, 2010

Species
- see text.

= Zealandopterix =

Genus of moths in family Micropterigidae

Zealandopterix is a genus of small primitive metallic moths in the family Micropterigidae.

== Species ==
- Zealandopterix zonodoxa (Meyrick, 1888)
