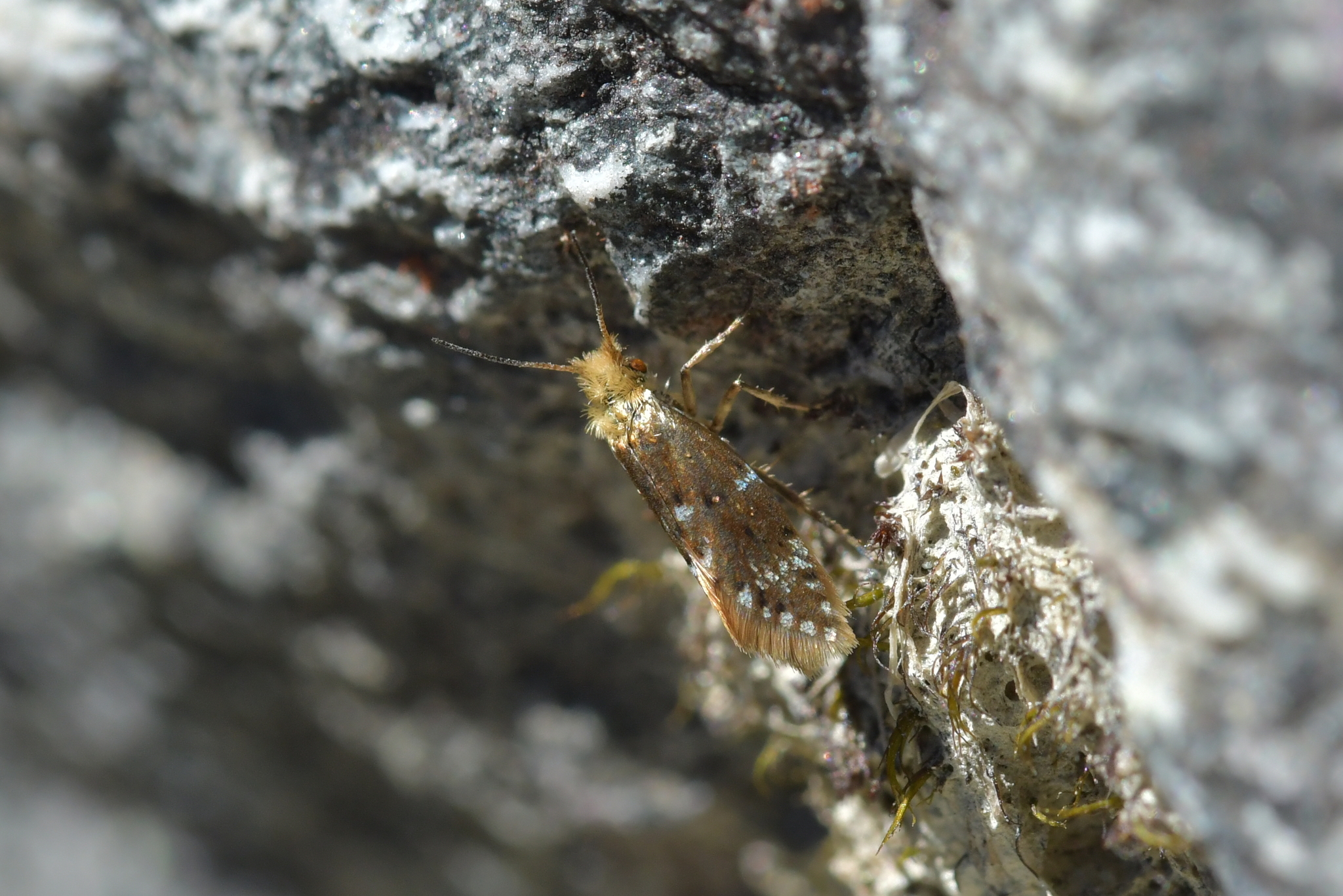

Scientific classification
- Kingdom: Animalia
- Phylum: Arthropoda
- Class: Insecta
- Order: Lepidoptera
- Family: Micropterigidae
- Genus: Sabatinca
- Species: S. chrysargyra

Binomial name
- Sabatinca chrysargyra (Meyrick, 1885)

Synonyms
- Palaeomicra chrysargyra Meyrick, 1885; Sabatinca passalota (Meyrick, 1923)

= Sabatinca chrysargyra =

Species of moth endemic to New Zealand

Sabatinca chrysargyra is a species of moth belonging to the family Micropterigidae. It was described by Edward Meyrick in 1886 and is endemic to New Zealand. It can be found from Franz Josef Glacier / Kā Roimata o Hine Hukatere south but only on the western side of the South Island. Adults are on the wing from the beginning of October until the middle of January. Larvae likely feed on foliose liverworts and have been found on species in the genus Plagiochila. The adult moths live in a range of habitats preferring sunny open spaces in forests or snow-tussock grasslands that can range in altitude from near sea level up to 1,230 m. This species is very similar in appearance to Sabatinca aemula and dissection of genitalia is required to distinguish between the two species.

== Taxonomy ==
This species was described by Edward Meyrick in 1885 named Palaeomicra chrysargyra using a specimen collected in December at Lake Wakatipu at an altitude of 1100 ft. Meyrick went on to give a fuller description of the species published in 1886. In 1912 Meyrick placed this species within the Sabatinca genus. Gibbs, in 2014, synonymised S. passalota with S. chrysargyra. Gibbs argued that Meyrick's justification for the separation of the taxa was incorrect as although specimens collected at higher altitudes had shorter, narrower wings there was no difference in genitalia nor was Meyrick's separation able to be justified through the bar-coding of the CO1 gene. The lectotype specimen is held in the Natural History Museum, London.

== Description ==
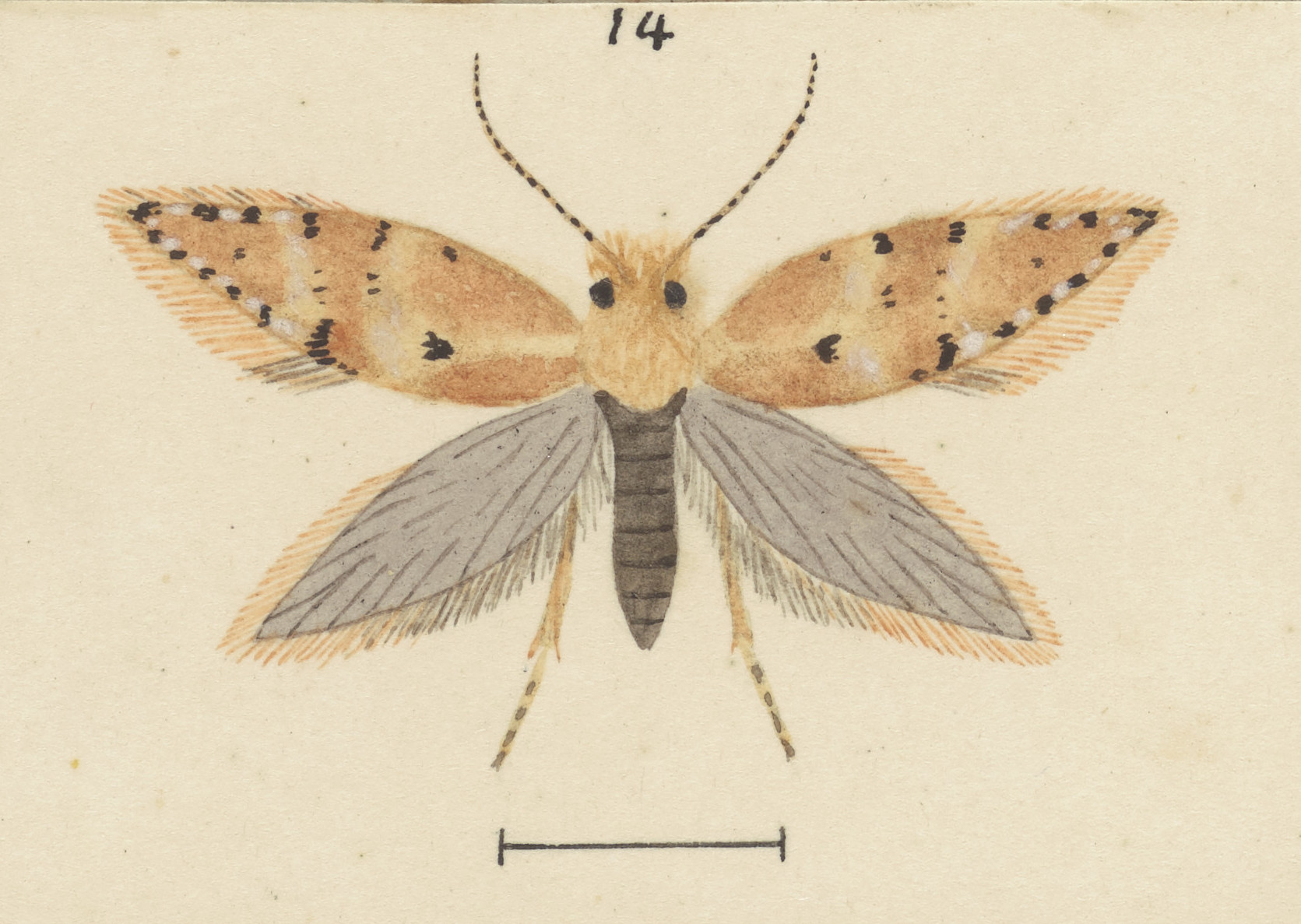
Illustration of S. chrysargyra by G. Hudson

The larvae of this species is grey-brown in colour with dark brown platelets.

Meyrick described this species as follows:

Male, female. — 9-10 1/2 mm. Head and thorax reddish-ochreous. Palpi light ochreous. Antennae dark grey. Abdomen grey. Legs light ochrtous. Forewings ovate-lanceolate, costa abruptly bent near base, thence moderately arched, apex acute, hindmargin very oblique, slightly sinuate; shining golden-ochreous; markings very indistinct, shining ochreous-whitish; a very irregular fascia before middle, a second at 1/3, both often interrupted, and a series of several small spots along hindmargin and apical portion of costa; a dark fuscous dot in disc before middle, sometimes obsolete : cilia pale shining golden-ochreous. Hindwings purplish-grey; cilia whitish-grey.

S. chrysargyra specimens collected at higher altitudes have wings that are narrower and shorter. This species is very similar in appearance to Sabatinca aemula and dissection of genitalia may be required to distinguish between the two species. S. chrysargyra differs in wing pattern from S. aemula as it has different sized spots on its wings rather than perceptible fasciae.

== Distribution ==
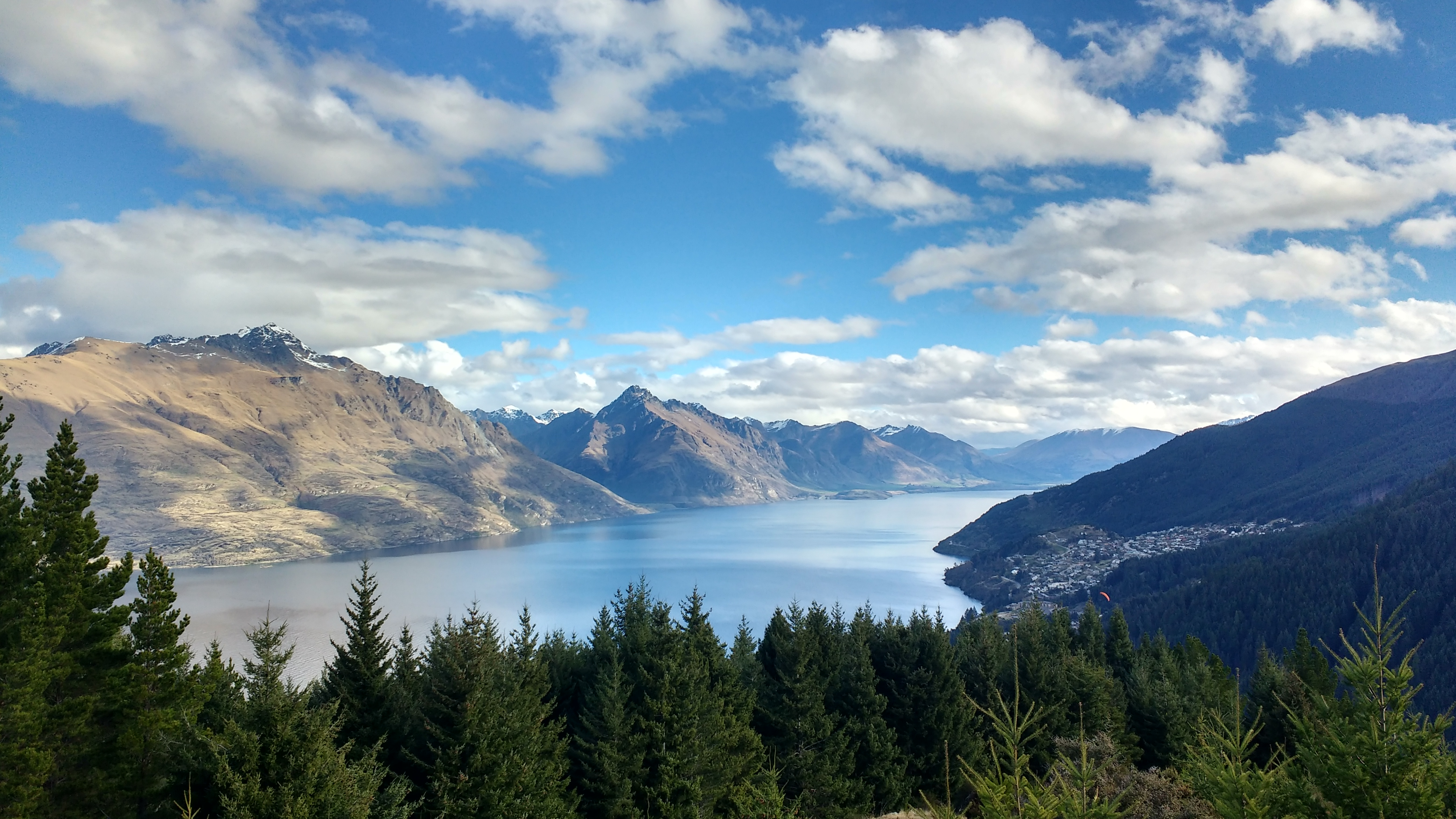
Lake Wakatipu, type locality for S. chrysargyra.

S. chrysargyra is endemic to New Zealand and can be found from Franz Josef Glacier / Kā Roimata o Hine Hukatere south only on the western side of the South Island. It can be found at a wide range of altitudes from sea level up to 1,230 m.

== Behaviour ==
This species is on the wing from the beginning of October until the middle of January.

== Host species and habitat ==
The larvae likely feed on feed on foliose liverworts. Larvae of this species have been found on liverworts in the genus Plagiochila. This species prefers sunny but open habitats including in forests near seepages or streams at near sea level altitudes up to subalpine snow-tussock habitats.
