= Sabatinca delobelli =

Scientific classification
- Domain: Eukaryota
- Kingdom: Animalia
- Phylum: Arthropoda
- Class: Insecta
- Order: Lepidoptera
- Family: Micropterigidae
- Genus: Sabatinca
- Species: S. delobelli

Binomial name
- Sabatinca delobelli Viette, 1978

Species of moth

Sabatinca delobelli is a species of moth in the family Micropterigidae. It was described by French entomologist Pierre Viette in 1978 and is known from New Caledonia.
