= Sabatinca weheka =

Conservation status
- Data Deficit (NZ TCS)

Scientific classification
- Kingdom: Animalia
- Phylum: Arthropoda
- Clade: Pancrustacea
- Class: Insecta
- Order: Lepidoptera
- Family: Micropterigidae
- Genus: Sabatinca
- Species: S. weheka

Binomial name
- Sabatinca weheka Gibbs, 2014

Species of moth endemic to New Zealand

Sabatinca weheka is a species of moth belonging to the family Micropterigidae. This species is endemic to New Zealand where it can be found near Lake Matheson and also on Secretary Island. This species is very similar in appearance to S. heighwayi in both their larval and adult forms but the adults of S. weheka differ as they are darker and more strongly marked on the forewings and have a dark brownish base colour to their wings. This species is on the wing from the middle to the end of October and lives in forest with a high rainfall. The larval host species is the liverwort Plagiochila deltoidea. In 2025 this species was classified as "data deficient" under the New Zealand Threat Classification System.

== Taxonomy ==
This species was first described by George Gibbs in 2014 using specimens collected at Lake Matheson by Gibbs. The male holotype specimen is held in the New Zealand Arthropod Collection.

This species is very similar in appearance to S. heighwayi however its morphology is distinctive and this distinction has been confirmed by gene sequencing.

== Description ==
The larvae of this species is very similar in appearance to the larvae of S. heighwayi which are a pale yellowish-green colour.

Gibbs described the adults of this species as follows:

Large size (fwl ca 6 mm); fw with a number of narrow transverse whitish fasciae, dominated by a broad white fascia at 1/3 with kink toward anal margin, heavily shaded with dark brown scales on proximal side. A pair of unique posterior horns on ventral lobe of valvae.

The adults of this species differ from S. heighwayi as they have darker, more strongly marked appearance to their forewings with a dark brownish base colour.

== Distribution ==
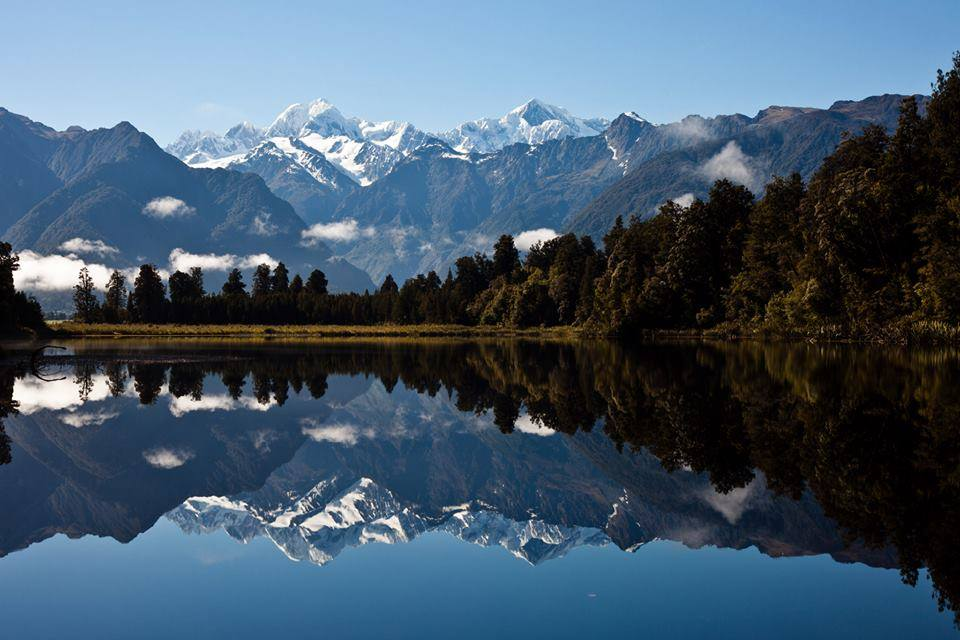
Lake Matheson, type locality for S. weheka.

This species is endemic to New Zealand and is known from Lake Matheson in Westland and also Grono Spur on Secretary Island in Fiordland.

== Life cycle ==
This species overwinters in its pupa state and emerges in October. This species is on the wing only from the middle to the end of October. The larvae mature until January when they pupate.

== Host plants and habitat ==
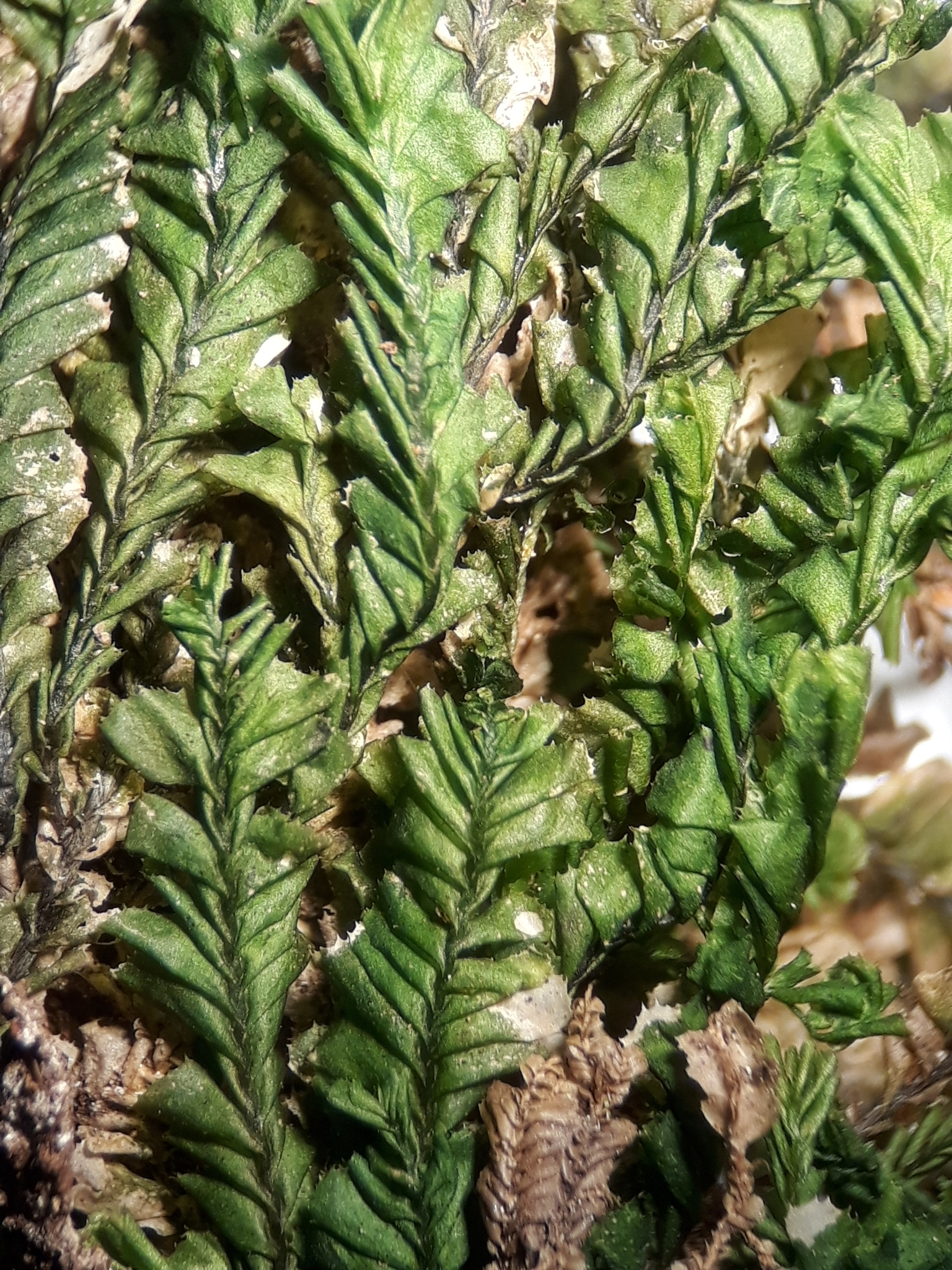
Plagiochila deltoidea, larval host species for S. weheka.

This species inhabits forest with a high rainfall. The larval host species is the liverwort Plagiochila deltoidea which, as a result of the high rainfall in the localities where S. weheka is found, can grow up the trunks of trees.

== Conservation status ==
In 2025 this species was classified by the New Zealand Department of Conservation as "data deficient" under the New Zealand Threat Classification System.
