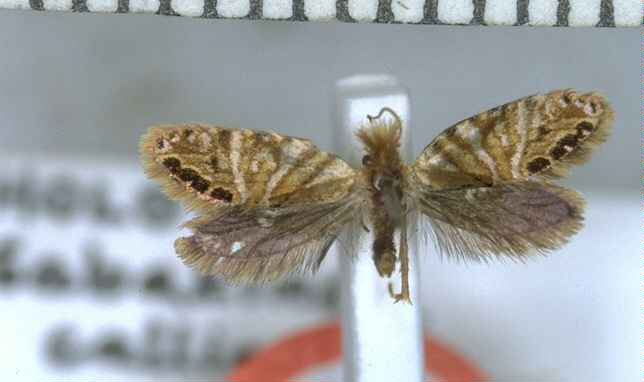
- Holotype specimen

Scientific classification
- Kingdom: Animalia
- Phylum: Arthropoda
- Class: Insecta
- Order: Lepidoptera
- Family: Micropterigidae
- Genus: Sabatinca
- Species: S. calliarcha

Binomial name
- Sabatinca calliarcha Meyrick, 1912

= Sabatinca calliarcha =

Species of moth endemic to New Zealand

Sabatinca calliarcha is a species of moth belonging to the family Micropterigidae. It was described by Edward Meyrick in 1912. It is endemic to New Zealand. It is found in two separate areas of New Zealand - the first in the northern parts of the North Island including Great Barrier Island and the second population can be found from the top of the South Island down to Southland. The adults of the species are on the wing from the end of September until the middle of January. The species prefers to inhabit damp forests and larvae likely feed on leafy liverwort species. Adult moths likely feed on the spores of ferns or the pollen of sedge grasses.

== Taxonomy ==
This species was described by Edward Meyrick in 1912 using a specimen collected in December by Alfred Philpott at Blue Cliffs, Te Waewae Bay in Fiordland. George Hudson described and illustrated this species in his 1928 publication The butterflies and moths of New Zealand. The male holotype specimen is held at the Natural History Museum, London.

== Description ==
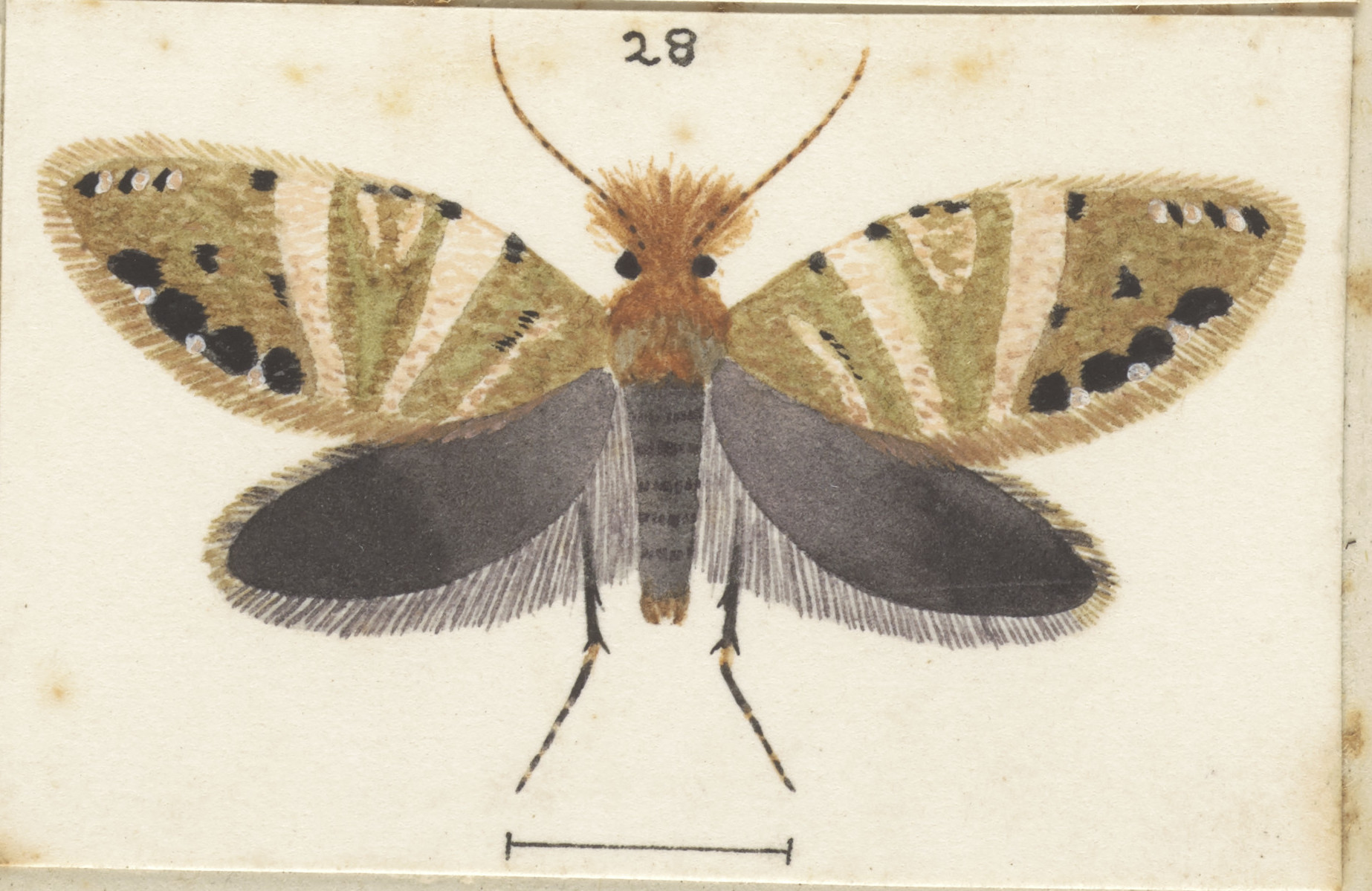
Male Sabatinca calliarcha illustrated by George Hudson

Meyrick described the adults of this species as follows:

♂. 12 mm. Head light bronzy-ochreous, hairs extremely long. with long bronzy-ochreous hairs, beneath which is a white bent stripe on each side of back. Abdomen blackish, apex ochreous-whitish. Forewings elongate-ovate, costa moderately arched, apex obtuse, termen very obliquely rounded; yellow; dorsum suffused with ferruginous-brown, with a few black scales on edge; four golden-whitish streaks from costa between base and f converging towards posterior half of dorsum, first edged posteriorly with ferruginous-brown mixed with indigo-black, hardly reaching dorsum, other three margined on both sides with ferruginous-brown streaks and on costa with black, second and fourth reaching dorsum, third reaching about half across wing; posterior area ferruginous-brownish somewhat mixed with pale yellowish, with an irregular black dot in disc at 3/4, and four black dots on costa edged beneath with golden-whitish; a thick black streak lying along termen from near apex to tornus, edged with ochreous-yellowish and interrupted to form a long upper and short lower portion, upper portion including two golden-metallic terminal dots : cilia light ochreous-yellowish, with a violet-coppery basal line edged externally with grey. Hindwings deep purple, disc and veins blackish; cilia blackish-grey.

The wingspan of this species is approximately 1 cm. In comparison to other species in the Sabatinca genus the forewing pattern of S. calliarcha is more complex and variable.

== Distribution ==
This species is endemic to New Zealand. This species is very wide spread being found in the northern parts of the North Island, that is the Waitākere and Coromandel ranges as well as Great Barrier Island, and in the South Island from Nelson down to the Southland and Fiordland. It has been hypothesised that these two populations have been separated for a long period of time.

== Behaviour ==
Adults are on the wing from the end of September until the middle of January. Adult moths have been seen resting on algae covered stones where its wing colouration ensures it is well camouflaged. When disturbed it takes flight and comes to rest a short distance away. It is very difficult to see when on the wing.

== Host species and habitat ==
Like other species in the genus Sabatinca the larvae of S. calliarcha likely feed on foliose liverworts. The adults of the species likely feeding on fern spores or sedge pollen. This species prefers to inhabit damp forests.
