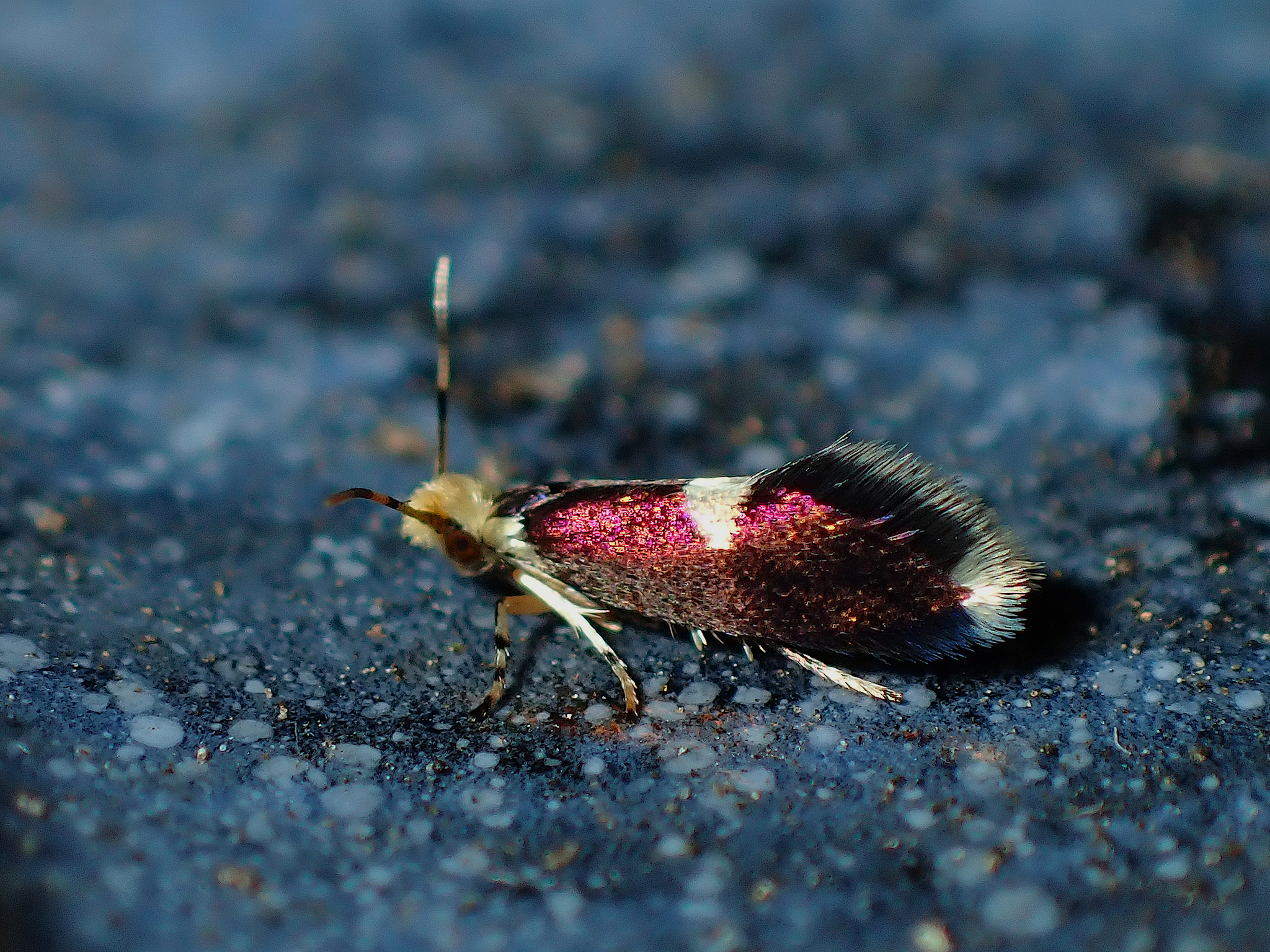

Scientific classification
- Kingdom: Animalia
- Phylum: Arthropoda
- Class: Insecta
- Order: Lepidoptera
- Family: Micropterigidae
- Genus: Zealandopterix
- Species: Z. zonodoxa

Binomial name
- Zealandopterix zonodoxa (Meyrick, 1888)

Synonyms
- Palaeomicra zonodoxa Meyrick, 1888; Sabatinca zonodoxa (Meyrick, 1888); Sabatinca rosicoma Meyrick, 1914

= Zealandopterix zonodoxa =

Species of moth endemic to New Zealand

Zealandopterix zonodoxa is a moth of the family Micropterigidae. It is endemic to New Zealand and is located from Hawkes Bay north as well as on Poor Knights, Little Barrier and the Great Barrier Islands. It is the smallest micropterigid in New Zealand and the shiny white markings on the forewing of this species display variation. It is a moth that is active during the day, but has been collected using UV light. Adults are on the wing from September to March and the species has been witnessed visiting the flowers of Nīkau and Cordyline pumilio in large numbers. It inhabits a wide variety of moist indigenous forest but is associated with forests in which podocarps are common. Larvae have been sieved from rotten wood on the floor of a mixed podocarp/broadleaf forest or extracted from moss or from bryophytes.

== Taxonomy ==
Zealandopterix zonodoxa was first described by Edward Meyrick in 1888 as Palaeomicra zonodoxa using specimens collected in the Waitākere ranges in December. In 1912 Meyrick placed this species within the Sabatinca genus. George Hudson discussed and illustrated this species under this name in his 1928 book The butterflies and moths of New Zealand. In 1988 this placement was also confirmed by J. S. Dugdale in his Catalogue of New Zealand Lepidoptera. In 2010 Gibbs synonymised S. rosicoma, and placed it in the newly created genus Zealandopterix. The lectotype specimen is held in the Natural History Museum in London.

== Description ==
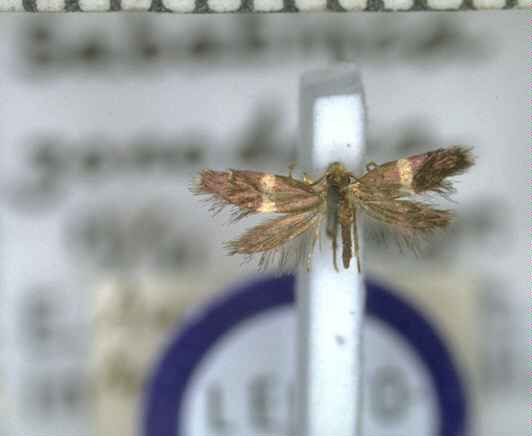
Z. zonodoxa lectotype specimen

Meyrick originally described the species as follows:

Male, female. — 7-8 mm. Head ferruginous or pale ochreous. Palpi whitish-ochreous. Antennas pale ochreous, with three more or less perceptible blackish bands. Thorax whitish-yellowish. Abdomen dark grey. Anterior and middle legs whitish-ocbreous, apex of joints black; posterior legs dark grey, apex of joints whitish-ochreous. Forewings oblong, costa abruptly bent near base, thence gently arched, apex acute, hindmargin straight, very oblique; neuration quite as in P. chalcophanes; dark fuscous purple, with bronzy reflections; extreme base whitish-yellowish; a moderately broad straight whitish-yellowish fascia before middle, generally narrowest above; a whitish-yellowish dot or small spot on costa about 3/4, variable in size, sometimes absent : cilia dark grey, with a rather large pale whitish-yellowish apical spot. Hindwings dark purple-grey; cilia dark grey.

In a 2014 publication, this species was described as having a forewing length of 2.6 millimetres (0.10 in) for males and 3 millimetres (0.12 in) for females.

This is the smallest micropterigid in New Zealand. The shiny white markings on the forewing of this species are variable.

== Distribution ==
This species is endemic to New Zealand. It is found from the northern North Island of New Zealand, from Te Paki south to Puketitri, Hawkes Bay and including Poor Knights, Little Barrier and Great Barrier Islands.

== Behaviour ==
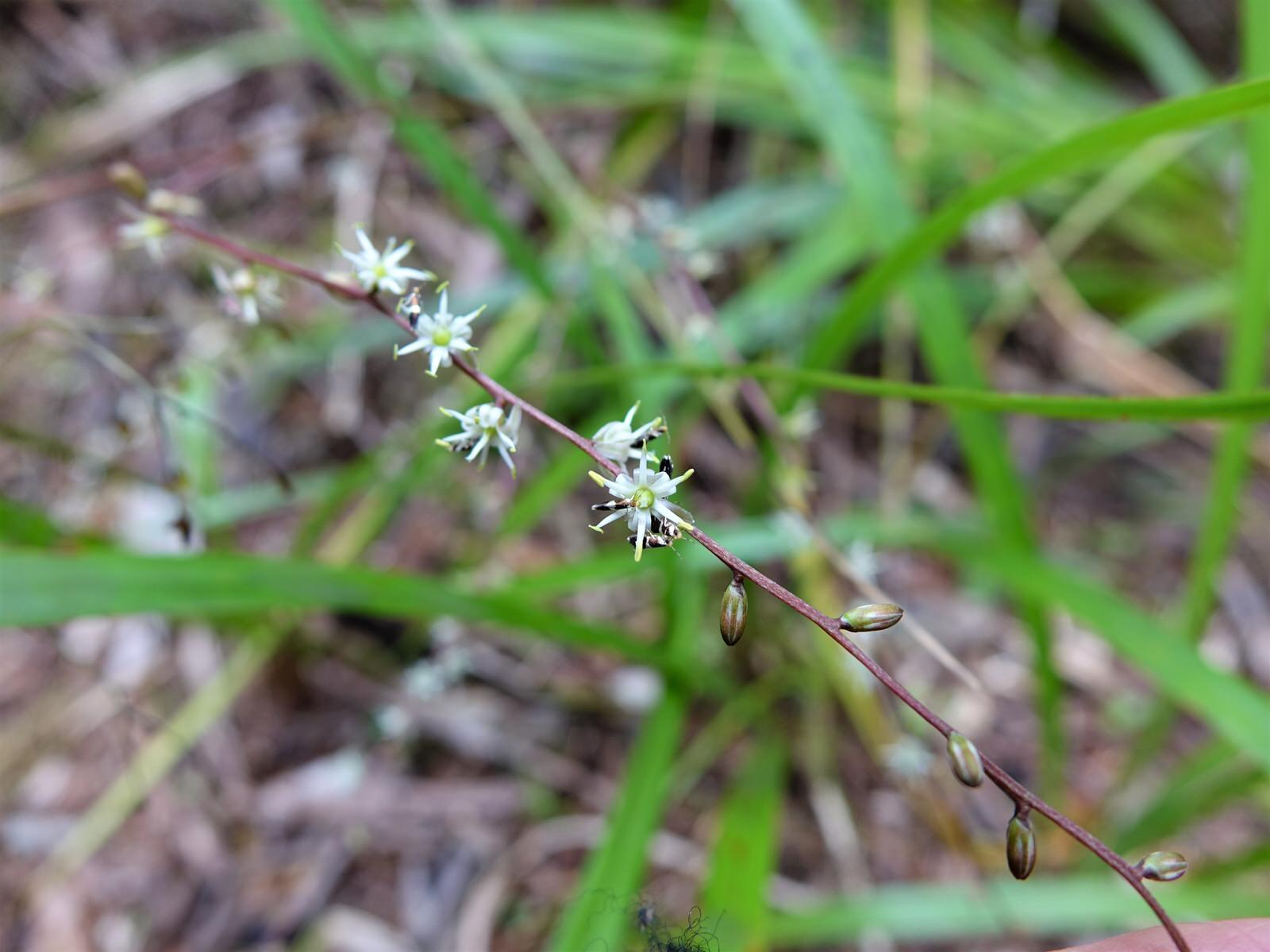
Zealandopterix zonodoxa 6090488

Z. zonodoxa is a moth that is active during the day and have been seen visiting the flowers of Nīkau and Cordyline pumilio in large numbers. This species has been collected using UV light. Adults develop wings between September and March.

== Hosts and habitat ==
This species inhabits a wide variety of moist indigenous forest types but is associated with forests in which podocarps are common. Adults have been observed feeding on the flowers of Cordyline pumilio.
