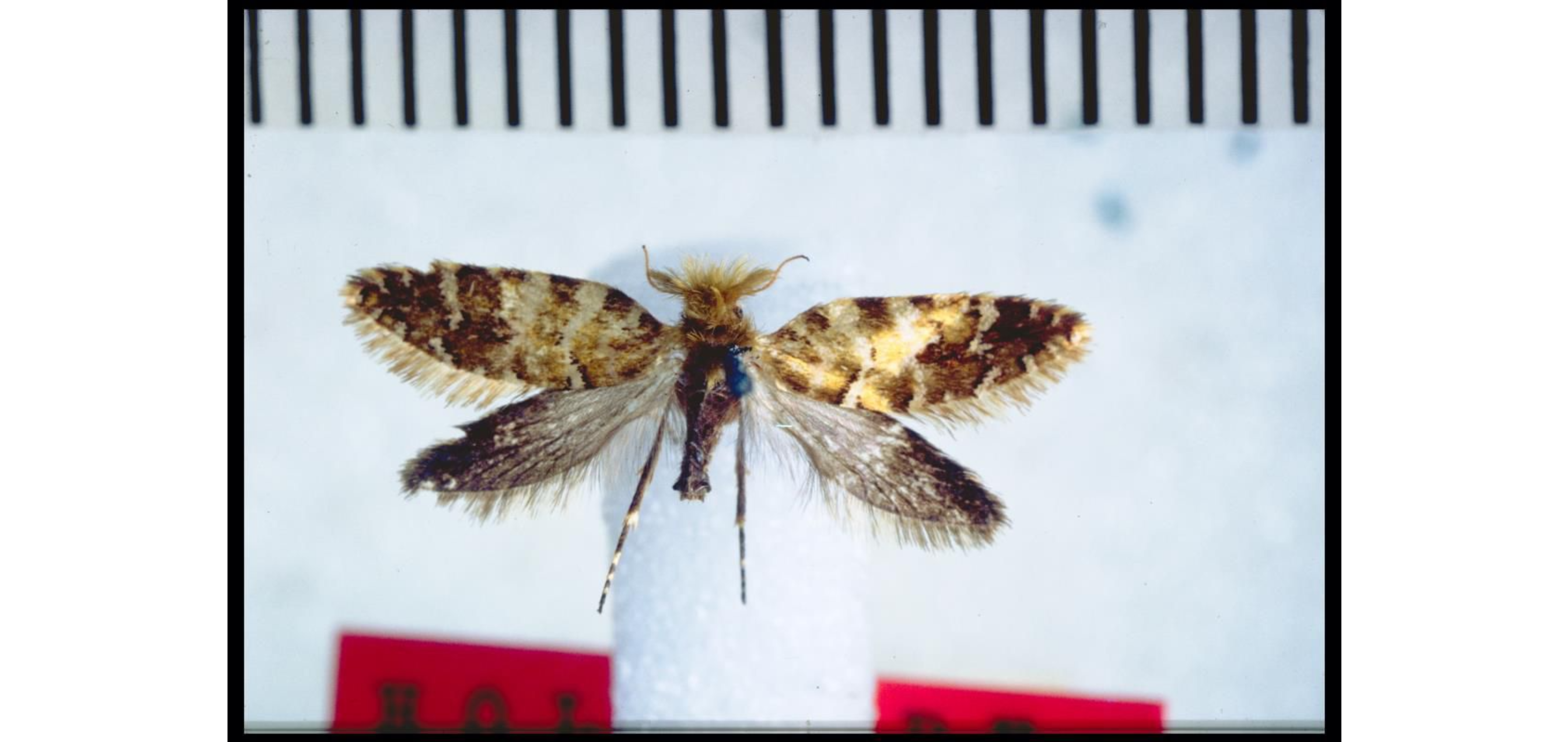
- Holotype

Scientific classification
- Kingdom: Animalia
- Phylum: Arthropoda
- Class: Insecta
- Order: Lepidoptera
- Family: Micropterigidae
- Genus: Sabatinca
- Species: S. heighwayi

Binomial name
- Sabatinca heighwayi Philpott, 1927

= Sabatinca heighwayi =

Species of moth

Sabatinca heighwayi is a species of moth belonging to the family Micropterigidae. It was described by Alfred Philpott in 1927 and is endemic to New Zealand. It can be found north of Lewis Pass in the north west of the South Island. Adult moths are on the wing from late September until the middle of January. The host of the larvae of this species is the foliose liverwort Plagiochila circumcincta.

== Taxonomy ==
This species was described by Alfred Philpott in 1927 using two female specimens collected by Mr W. Heighway at the Leslie Valley, Mount Arthur Tableland in November, 1915. The holotype specimen is held at the New Zealand Arthropod Collection.

== Original description ==
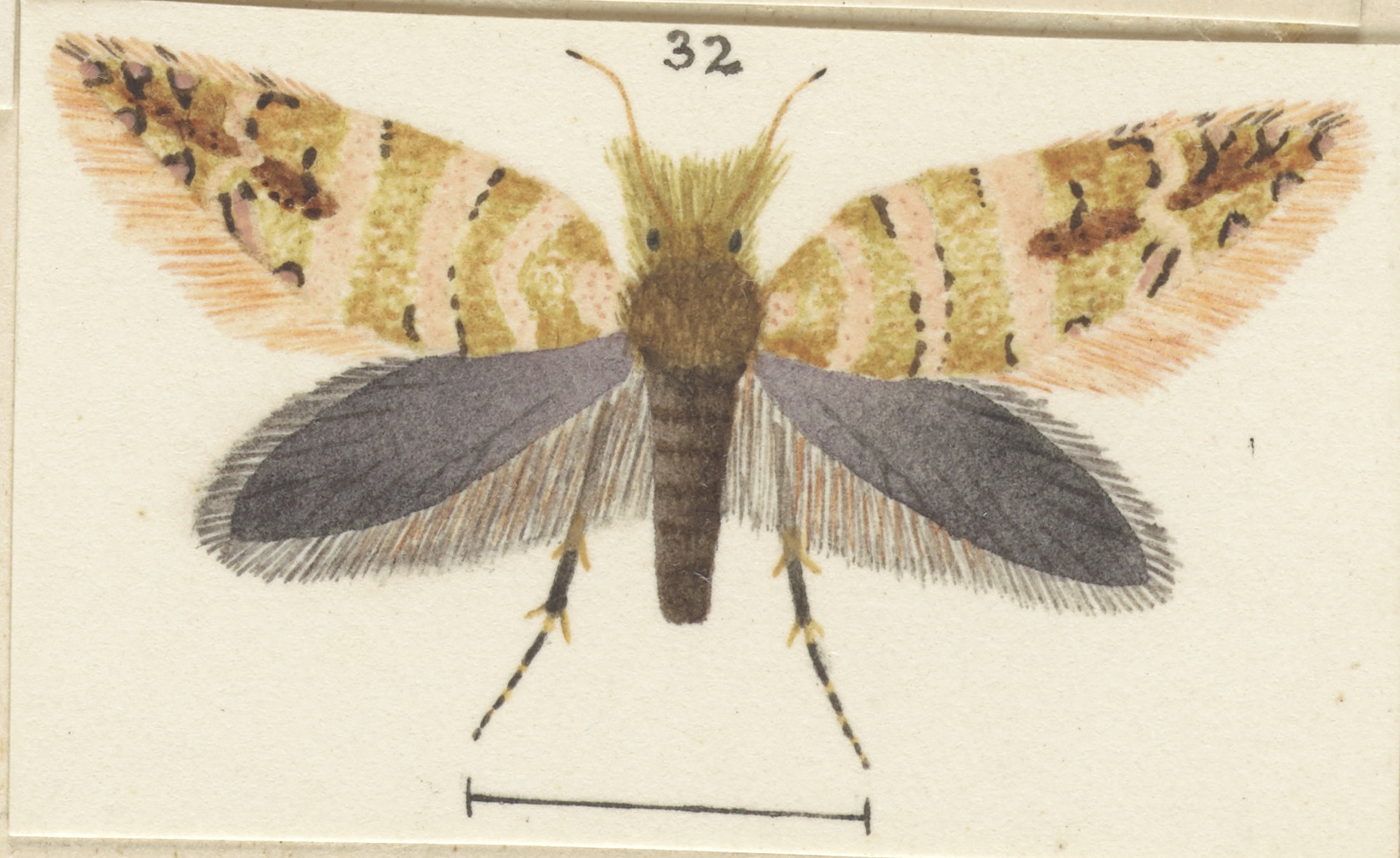
Illustration of S. heighwayi by George Hudson

Philpott described the adults of the species as follows:

♀. 13.5 mm. Head covered with dense long hair reaching beyond 1/2 of antennae, light tawny. Antennae bright brown, tips black. Thorax tawny, densely long-haired. Abdomen dark fuscous. Legs ochreous, tarsi banded with fuscous. Forewings long, costa strongly arched at base, apex round-pointed, termen very oblique; shining brassy; fasciae ivory-yellow with pink reflections; three equidistant complete curved fasciae between base and 1/2; at 2/3 a fascia interrupted below middle; between 1/2 and 3/4 a fascia indicated by marks on costa and dorsum; two fasciae near apex, broadly interrupted at middle; all fasciae are here and there margined with blackish; an obscure reddish shade commences in disc at third fascia and runs to apex; fringes pinkish-brown obscurely barred with pale yellow. Hindwings metallic violet, paler near base; fringes fuscous with some yellow at middle of termen.

This moth is one of the larger New Zealand endemic species within the genus Sabatinca and has a forewing band pattern of light bands surrounded by dark bands.

== Distribution ==
This species is endemic to New Zealand and can be found north of Lewis Pass in the north west of the South Island.

== Behaviour ==
Adult moths are on the wing from late September until the middle of January. This species is regarded as being very elusive.

== Host species and habitat ==
The host of the larvae of this species is the foliose liverwort Plagiochila circumcincta. S. heighwayi pupates during the winter months.
