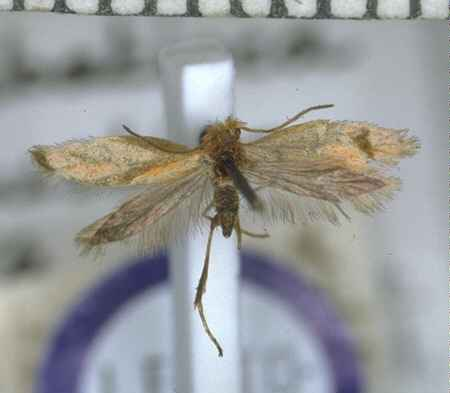

Scientific classification
- Kingdom: Animalia
- Phylum: Arthropoda
- Class: Insecta
- Order: Lepidoptera
- Family: Micropterigidae
- Genus: Sabatinca
- Species: S. caustica

Binomial name
- Sabatinca caustica Meyrick, 1912

Synonyms
- Sabatinca barbarica Philpott, 1918

= Sabatinca caustica =

Species of moth endemic to New Zealand

Sabatinca caustica is a species of moth belonging to the family Micropterigidae. It was described by Edward Meyrick in 1912. It is endemic to New Zealand and is found in both Southland and at Stewart Island / Rakiura. The adults of this species are variable in appearance with some specimens being mainly white on their forewings while others have forewings that are a more mottled purple-brown colour. Adults are on the wing from the start of October until the middle of December. Larvae feed on the surface of leafy liverworts.

== Taxonomy ==
This species was first described by Edward Meyrick in 1912 using specimens collected in October at Seaward Moss, Invercargill by Alfred Philpott. The lectotype specimen, designated by J. S. Dugdale in 1988, is held at the Natural History Museum, London. In 2014 George Gibbs synonymised S. barbarica with S. caustica arguing that S. caustica is extremely variable in appearance and that the morphological and molecular evidence does not support the separation of these taxa.

== Description ==
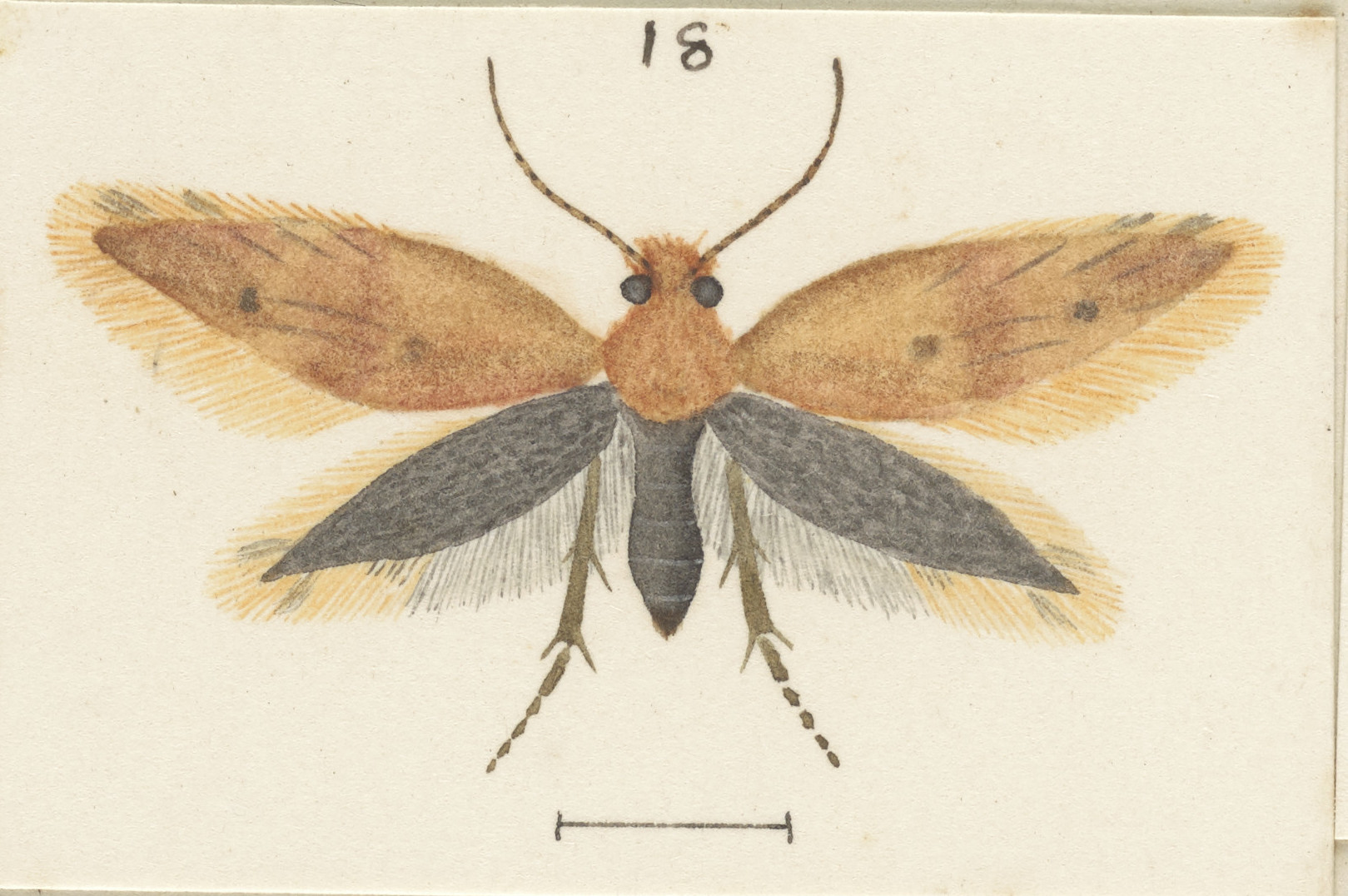
Sabatinca caustica as illustrated by George Hudson

Meyrick described the adults of the species as follows:

♂. 9-10 mm. Head and thorax bronzy-orange-ochreous thorax sometimes marked with whitish. Antennae ochreous, towards apex blackish. Abdomen dark purple-grey. Forewings ovate-lanceolate, costa moderately arched, apex pointed, termen extremely obliquely rounded; violet-coppery-ochreous, in one specimen largely suffused with whitish; in one specimen a spot of dark purple-fuscous suffusion on dorsum towards base, one in disc beyond middle, and some irregular marking towards termen, and in the whitish-suffused specimen the dark purple-fuscous suffusion forms a blotch along anterior portion of costa connected with a large oblique blotch in middle of disc, a streak along dorsum from base to 2/3, a subterminal fascia enclosing a white spot on costa and a mark along termen in middle, but in the other two specimens there are no markings : cilia golden-ochreous. Hindwings deep purple; cilia pale golden-ochreous.

The adults of this species are variable in appearance with some specimens being mainly white on their forewings while others have forewings that are a more mottled purple-brown colour.

== Distribution ==
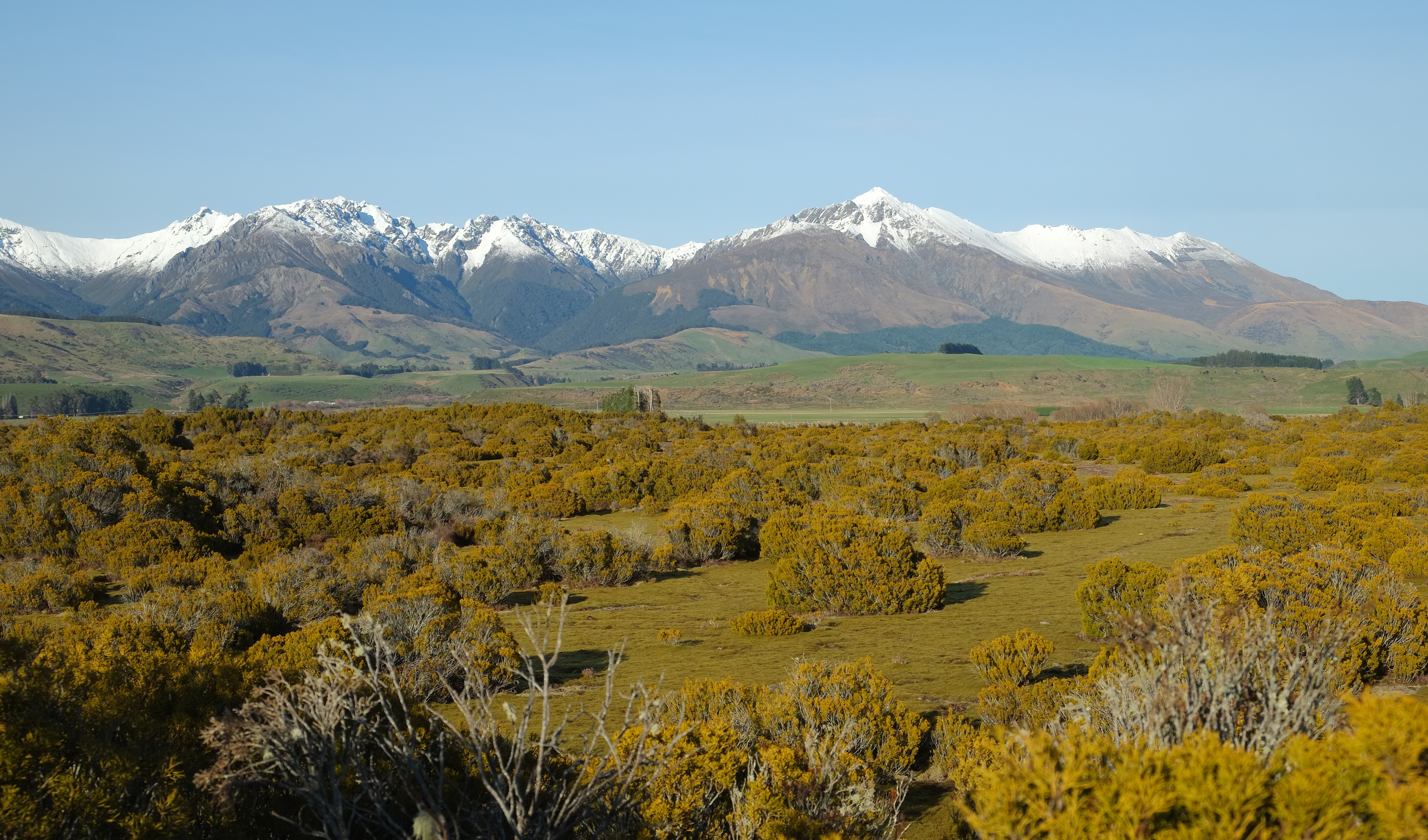
Takitimu Mountains, collection location of S. caustica

This species is endemic to New Zealand. This species is found in Southland, including in the Takitimu Mountains, and at Stewart Island / Rakiura.

== Behaviour ==
This species is on the wing from the start of October until the middle of December.

== Host species and habitat ==
Larvae feed on the surface of leafy liverworts.
