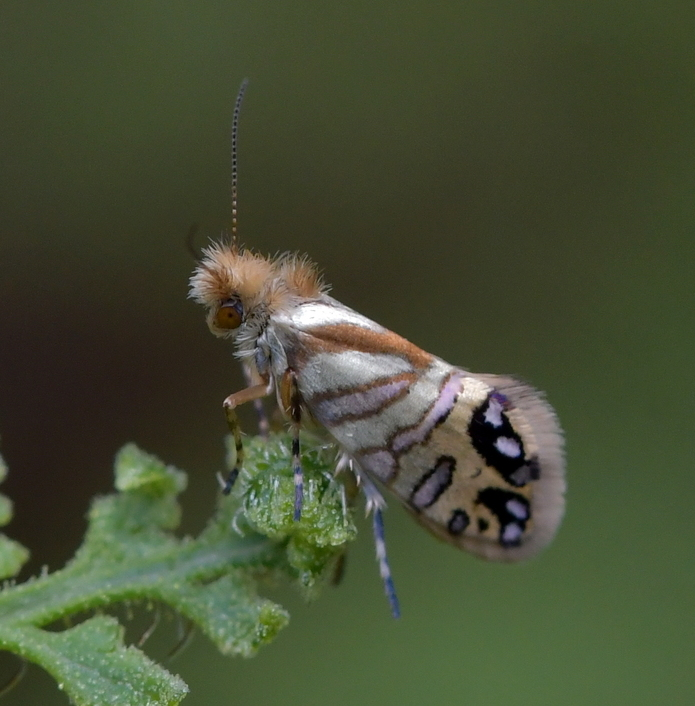

Scientific classification
- Kingdom: Animalia
- Phylum: Arthropoda
- Class: Insecta
- Order: Lepidoptera
- Family: Micropterigidae
- Genus: Sabatinca
- Species: S. doroxena

Binomial name
- Sabatinca doroxena (Meyrick, 1888)

Synonyms
- Palaeomicra doroxena Meyrick, 1888; Micropardalis doroxena (Meyrick, 1888)

= Sabatinca doroxena =

Moth species in family Micropterigidae

Sabatinca doroxena is a species of moth belonging to the family Micropterigidae. It is endemic to the North Island of New Zealand. This small moth has a colourful forewing pattern with stripes and dots evident. It has been hypothesised that the forewing pattern is intended to resemble a jumping spider in order to allow the adult moth to escape predation. Adults of this species are on the wing from the beginning of September until mid January. It prefers damp but sunny habitat in deep forest, at the forest edge or in open shrubland. Larvae feed on foliose liverwort species including on Leptoscyphus normalis. Adults of this species have been located at the blossoms of flowering Cordyline and Ranunculus species.

== Taxonomy ==
It was described by Edward Meyrick in 1888 using a specimen collected in the Waitākere Ranges in Kauri forest in December and was originally named Palaeomicra doroxena. In 1912 Meyrick placed this species within the genus Micropardalis. Both George Hudson in his 1928 book The Butterflies and Moths of New Zealand and J. S. Dugdale in his 1988 Catalogue of New Zealand Lepidoptera used the name Micropardalis doroxena when discussing this species. In 2014 the taxonomy of this species was revised and it was placed within the genus Sabatinca. As a result, this species is now known as Sabatinca doroxena. The holotype specimen is held in the Natural History Museum, London.

== Description ==
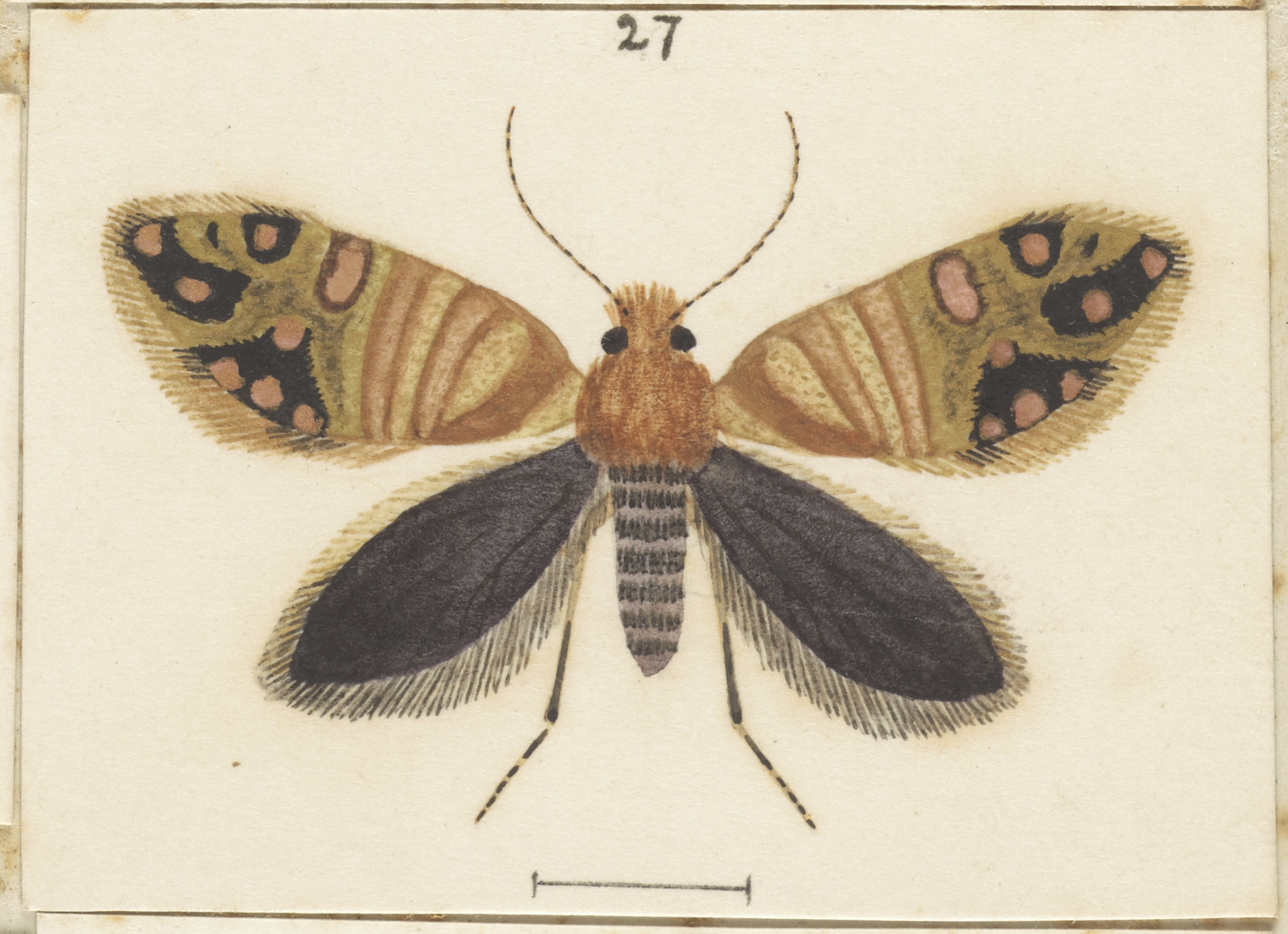
Sabatinca doroxena as illustrated by George Hudson

Meyrick described the adults of the species as follows:

Female wingspan 11 mm. Head and palpi light ochreous, sides of crown brown. Antennae dark fuscous, annulated with whitish-ochreous. Thorax ochreous-brown. Abdomen dark grey. Legs dark grey, ringed with pale ochreous. Forewings oblong, costa abruptly bent near base, thence gently arched, apex round-pointed, hindmargin straight, very oblique; neuration quite as in P. chalcophanes, but 7 and 8 separate; pale shining golden; two rather narrow oblique coppery-bronze fasciæ from costa near base and at 1/3, confluent on inner margin before middle; a straight rather narrow whitish-purplish fascia, margined with coppery-bronze, from middle of costa to inner margin beyond middle; a whitish-purplish black-margined transverse spot from costa at 2/3, reaching half across wing; a black semi-annular mark, its extremities touching costa at 4/5 and apex, marked with three shining whitish-purplish spots, and including a spot of ground-colour which contains a black costal dot; a semi-oval black anal blotch, not marginal except at extremities, containing three shining whitish-purplish spots near lower edge, and one in a small projection on upper edge: cilia pale golden, with blackish apical, median, and anal spots. Hindwings dark purple-grey; cilia grey.

== Distribution ==
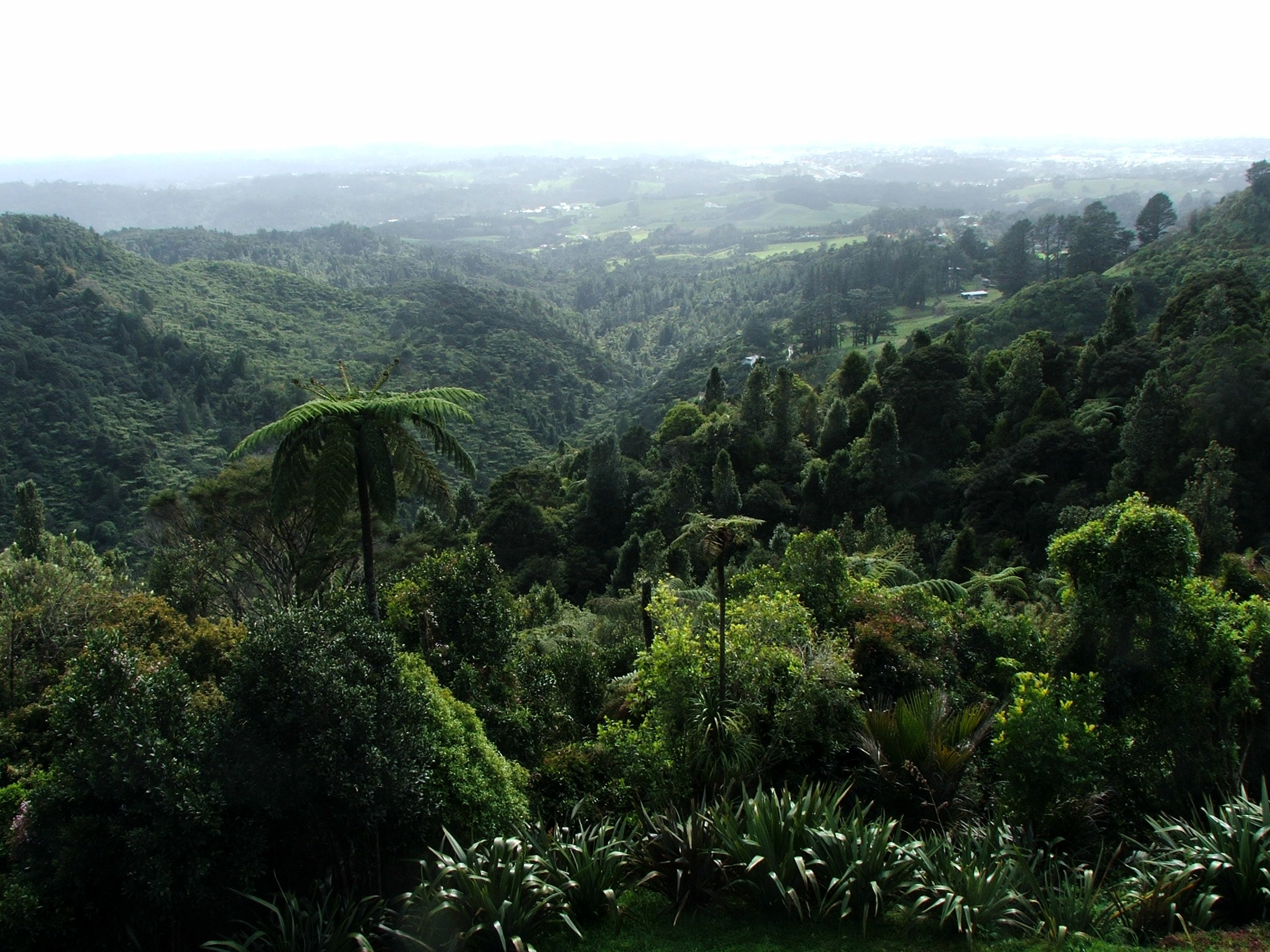
Waitakere Ranges, type locality of S. doroxena.

This species is endemic to New Zealand and found throughout the North Island.

== Habitat and host species ==
This species prefers damp but sunny habitat and can be found within deep forest, at the forest edge or in open shrubland. Larvae feed on foliose liverwort species including on Heteroscyphus normalis now known as Leptoscyphus normalis. Adults of this species have been located at the blossoms of flowering Cordyline and Ranunculus species.

== Behaviour ==
Adults of this species are on the wing from the beginning of September until mid January. This moth has been collected by sweeping plant foliage.
