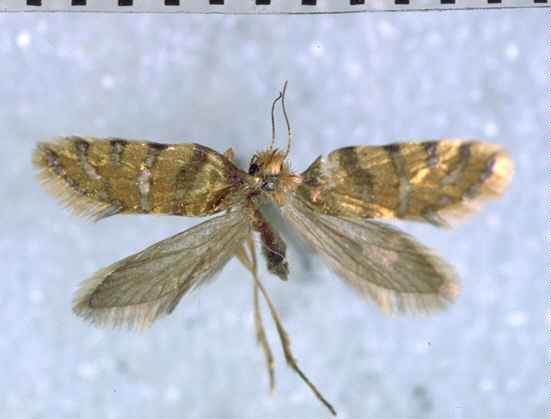

Scientific classification
- Kingdom: Animalia
- Phylum: Arthropoda
- Class: Insecta
- Order: Lepidoptera
- Family: Micropterigidae
- Genus: Sabatinca
- Species: S. aurella

Binomial name
- Sabatinca aurella Hudson, 1918

Synonyms
- Micropardalis aurella (Hudson, 1918)

= Sabatinca aurella =

Moth species in family Micropterigidae

Sabatinca aurella is a species of moth of the family Micropterigidae. It is endemic to New Zealand. The larvae of this species are variable in appearance but tend to be coloured yellow-green with greyish patches. The adults of the species have a pale golden appearance with silver or purple coloured bars on the forewings. The moth has an approximate wingspan of around 1 cm. This species is found from the Coromandel Peninsula to the Fox Glacier and is on the wing from September to January. A larval host species is the liverwort Heteroscyphus lingulatus. The preferred habitat of this species is at higher altitudes than other New Zealand endemic species in this genus; and the moth tends to prefer forest or subalpine grass or scrubland.

== Taxonomy ==
This species was first described by George Hudson in 1918. Hudson used a specimen collected by R. M. Sunley at an altitude of 910 metres (3,000 ft) in the Tararua Ranges. In 1923 Edward Meyrick placed this species within the Micropardalis genus. This placement was accepted by J. S. Dugdale in his 1988 publication Lepidoptera - annotated catalogue, and keys to family-group taxa. However G. W. Gibbs revised this combination in 2014 and placed this species within the Sabatinca genus. Meyrick had justified the placement of this species in the Micropardalis genus on the basis of wing venation. However Gibbs argued that a survey of wing venation across all Sabatinca species showed that a series existed and that S. aurella formed a part of that series. He therefore concluded that there was no longer any grounds for that genus distinction. The female lectotype specimen is held at the Museum of New Zealand Te Papa Tongarewa.

== Description ==
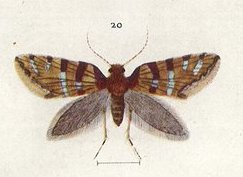
Sabatinca aurella illustrated by George Hudson.

The larvae of this species are variable in appearance but tend to be coloured yellow-green with greyish patches.

Hudson described the adults of this species as follows:

The expansion of the wings is 7/16 inch. The fore wings, which have the costa very abruptly arched at the base and the termen very oblique, are bright, golden-ochreuus with the veins well marked and deeply depressed; there is a large crimson-orange-metallic basal patch, purple on the costa; a curved transverse band at about 1/3 deep crimson-purple-metallic on the costa, metallic-blue below the middle, and crimson on the dorsum; another narrower band at about 1/3, deep purple on the costa, thence brilliant metallic-blue to the dorsum; two long costal bars beyond this, purple on the costa, pale metallic-blue towards the disc; an irregular confluent series of crimson and metallic-blue spots on the termen; the cilia are golden-ochreous. The hind wings are blackish with strong purple reflections. The head and thorax are clothed with long rusty-orange hairs. The abdomen is blackish. The antennae are orange, black towards the apex.

A "pale shining golden" species, these moths have a forewing length of between 4.2 and 5.2mm. The wing patterns of S. aurella are regarded as being the most "straightforward" of New Zealand species in this genus. The forewing pattern is similar to that of Sabatinca doroxena.

== Distribution ==
This species is endemic to New Zealand. It is one of New Zealand's most frequently encountered jaw-moths, this species is found from as far North as the Coromandel Peninsula to as far South as Fox Glacier.

== Behaviour ==
This species is on the wing from the beginning of September until the end of January. It is most common from mid-November to the end of December.

== Host species and habitat ==
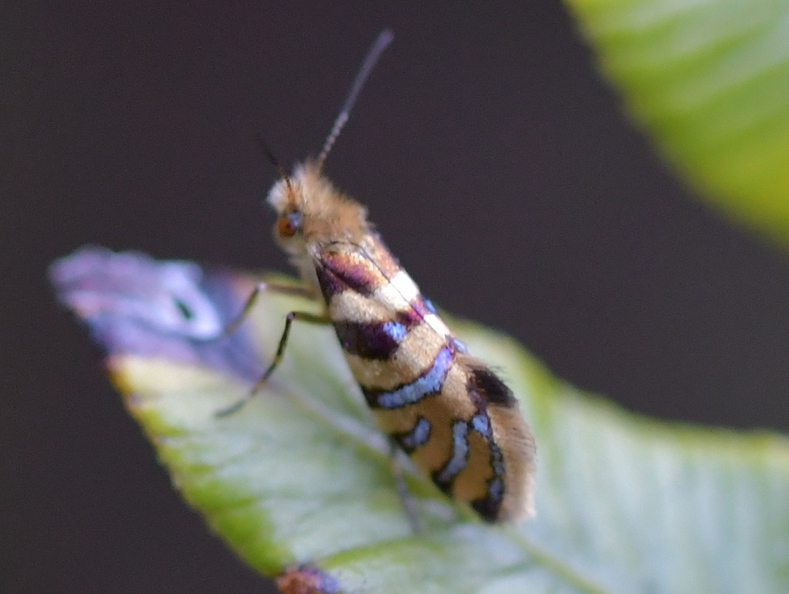
Sabatinca aurella

A larval host species is the liverwort formerly known as Heteroscyphus normalis and now known as Heteroscyphus lingulatus. This species tends to prefer forest or subalpine grasslands or shrublands habitat at a higher altitude than other New Zealand endemic species within the genus Sabatinca.
