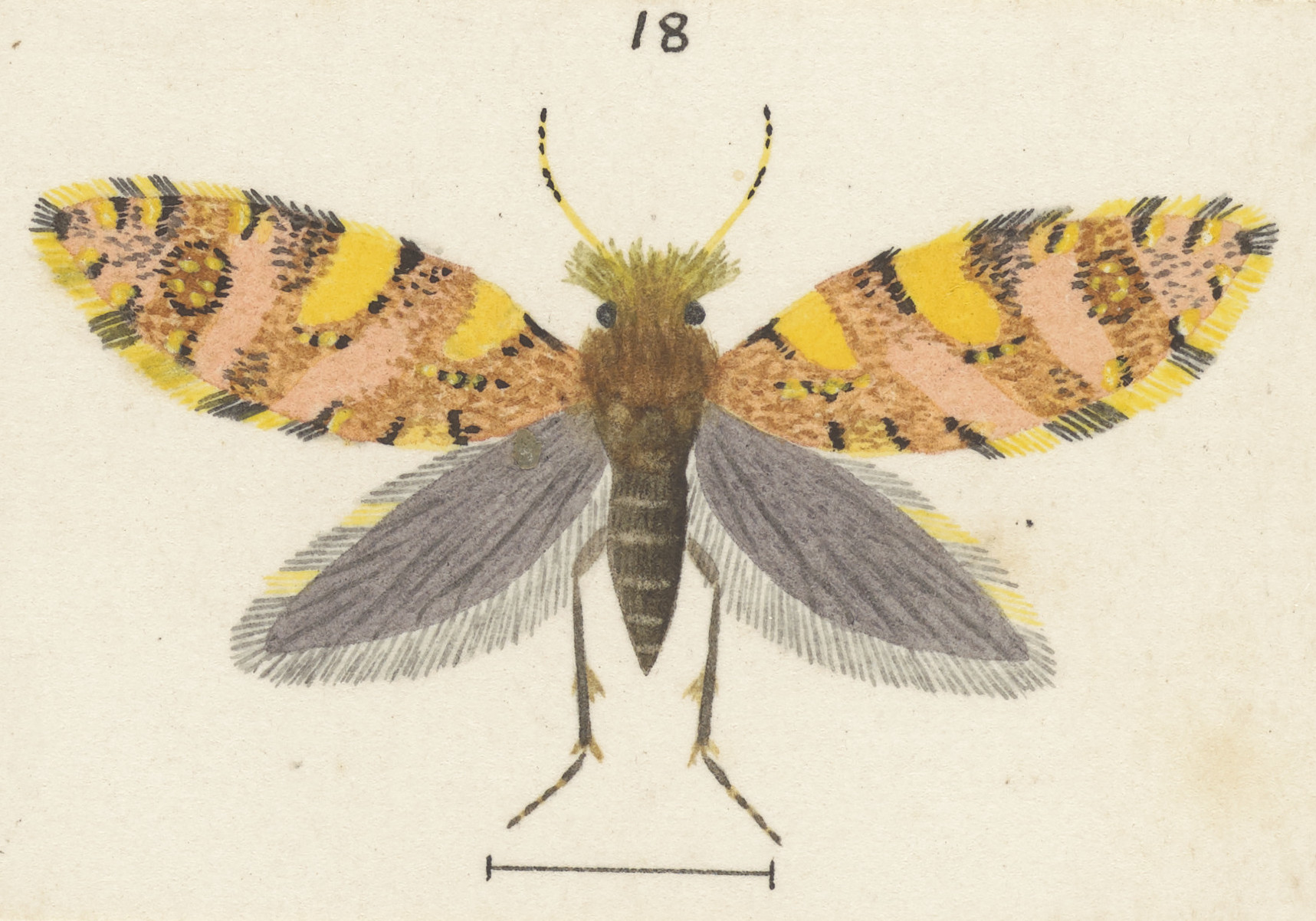

Scientific classification
- Kingdom: Animalia
- Phylum: Arthropoda
- Class: Insecta
- Order: Lepidoptera
- Family: Micropterigidae
- Genus: Sabatinca
- Species: S. incongruella

Binomial name
- Sabatinca incongruella Walker, 1863

Synonyms
- Oecophora munda Felder & Rogenhofer, 1875; Sabatinca eodora Meyrick, 1918

= Sabatinca incongruella =

Species of moth endemic to New Zealand

Sabatinca incongruella is a species of moth of the family Micropterigidae. It is endemic to New Zealand and is found only in the northern parts of the South Island. It is a day flying moth and is on the wing from mid January until late February. The larvae of this species feed on liverworts and the adult moths feed on the spores of fern species in the genus Pneumatopteris. This species can be confused with S. chalcophanes as it is very similar in appearance.

== Taxonomy ==
This species was first described by Francis Walker in 1863. Walker described the species from specimens collected by T. R. Oxley, a photographer and collector who lived in Nelson. Specimens collected by Oxley and forwarded to the British Museum (now held at the Natural History Museum, London) were mislabeled as being collected in Auckland. It is therefore presumed that the male lectotype specimen, held at the Natural History Museum, London, was collected in Nelson.

== Description ==
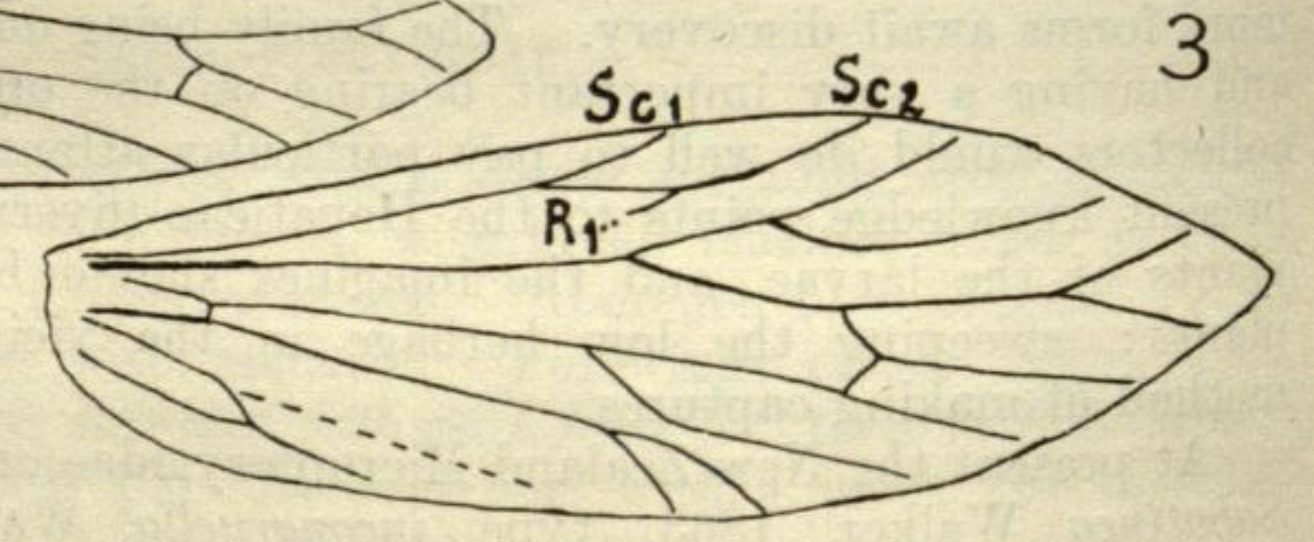
Venation of hindwing of S. incongruella

Walker described the male of the species as follows:

Dark ochraceous. Antennae with two black bands; second band apical. Abdomen blackish. Fore wings with a few black speckles; costa with black points and with some gilded yellow marks; of these the second forms a broad oblique streak, which extends to the disk and is much more conspicuous than the others; fringe yellow; under side and hind wings blackish purple.

The wingspan of the adults of this species is approximately 11 mm and the forewing pattern is made up of four colours. In 1923 Alfred Philpott published a paper where he attempted to find differences between the species within the Sabatinca genus by studying the venation of the hindwings. The venation of the hindwings of S. incongruella were similar in appearance to the majority of species within the genus as they had a "recurrent" vein.

This species can be confused with S. chalcophanes as it is similar in appearance.

== Distribution ==
This species is endemic to New Zealand and is only found in the northern part of the South Island, from the west of Picton and north of Reefton.

== Behaviour ==
S. incongruella is on the wing from the middle of January until the end of February. They are a day flying moth.

== Host species ==
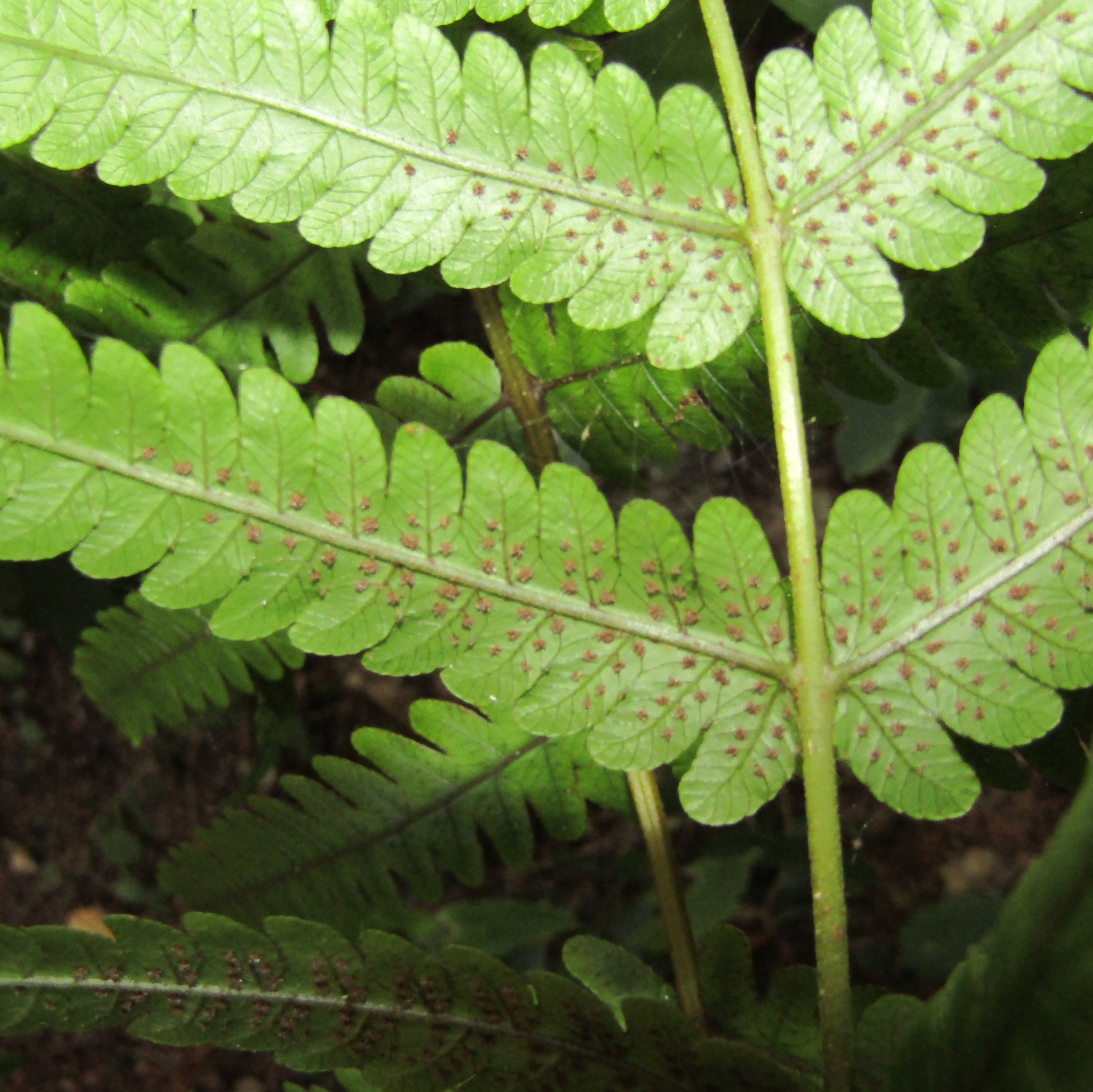
Spores of the fern Pneumatopteris pennigera

Larvae of this species feed on liverwort species where as the adult moths appear to feed on the spores of ferns within the genus Pneumatopteris. Adults have been recorded as feeding on the spores of Pneumatopteris pennigera.
