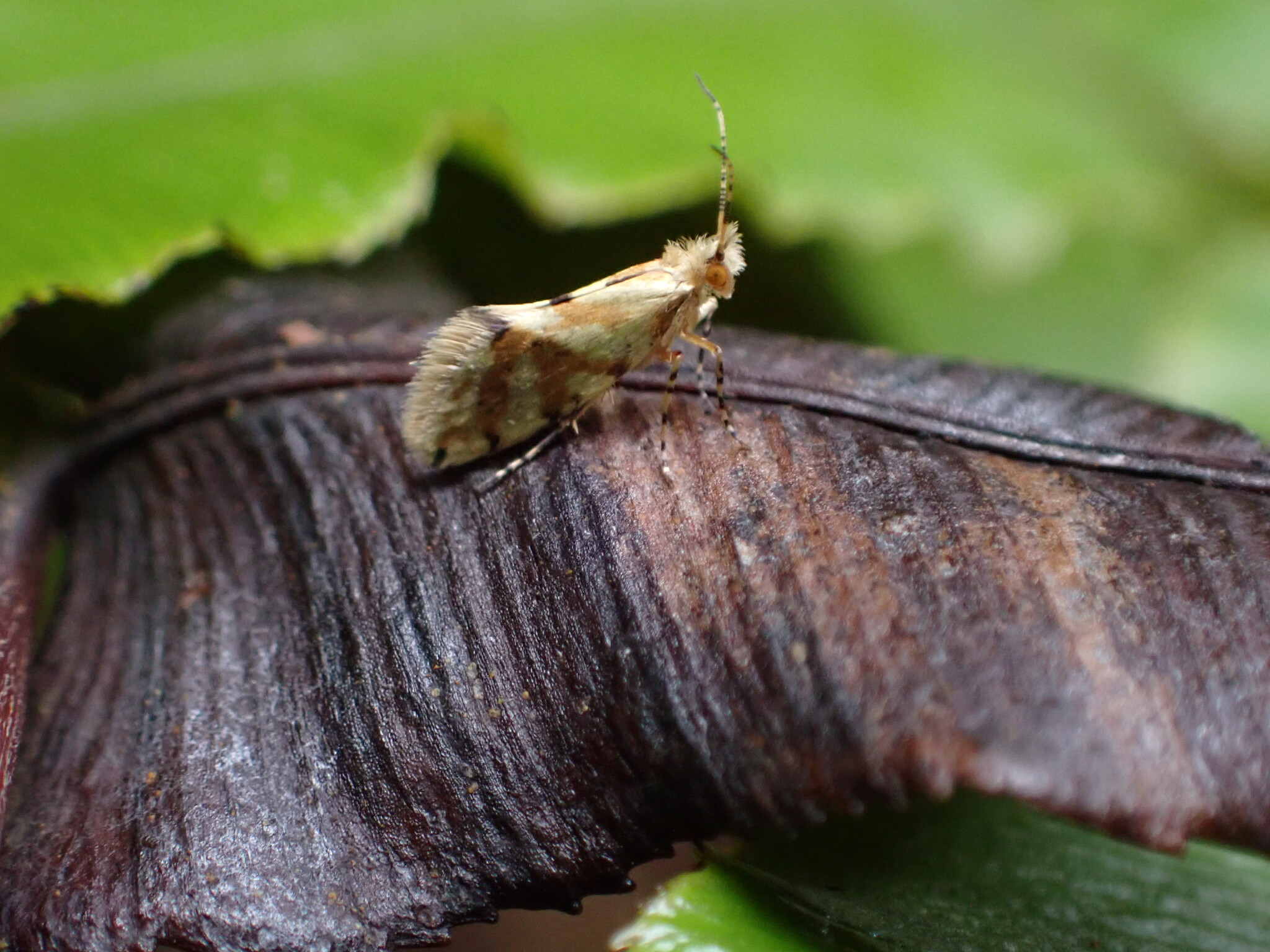

Scientific classification
- Kingdom: Animalia
- Phylum: Arthropoda
- Class: Insecta
- Order: Lepidoptera
- Family: Micropterigidae
- Genus: Sabatinca
- Species: S. chalcophanes

Binomial name
- Sabatinca chalcophanes (Meyrick, 1885)

Synonyms
- Palaeomicra chalcophanes Meyrick, 1885

= Sabatinca chalcophanes =

Species of moth

Sabatinca chalcophanes is a moth of the family Micropterigidae. This species is endemic to New Zealand and is found in the North Island apart from Northland and in the South Island apart from in the east, south of Queen Charlotte Sound. The adults of this species are on the wing from November to April and as a result of this long period it has been hypothesised that this species has two broods. The preferred habitat of this species is in damp lowland forest. The larval host species are foliose liverwort species including Hymenophyton flabellatum.

== Taxonomy ==
This species was described by Edward Meyrick in 1885 using material collected at "Makatoku" (likely a misspelling of Makotuku), in the Hawkes Bay, in March and named Palaeomicra chalcophanes. Meyrick went on to give a fuller description of the species published in 1886. In 1912 Meyrick wrongly synonymised S. chalcophanes with S. incongruella which subsequently caused confusion until the error was rectified in 1979. The male lectotype specimen is held at the Natural History Museum, London.

== Description ==
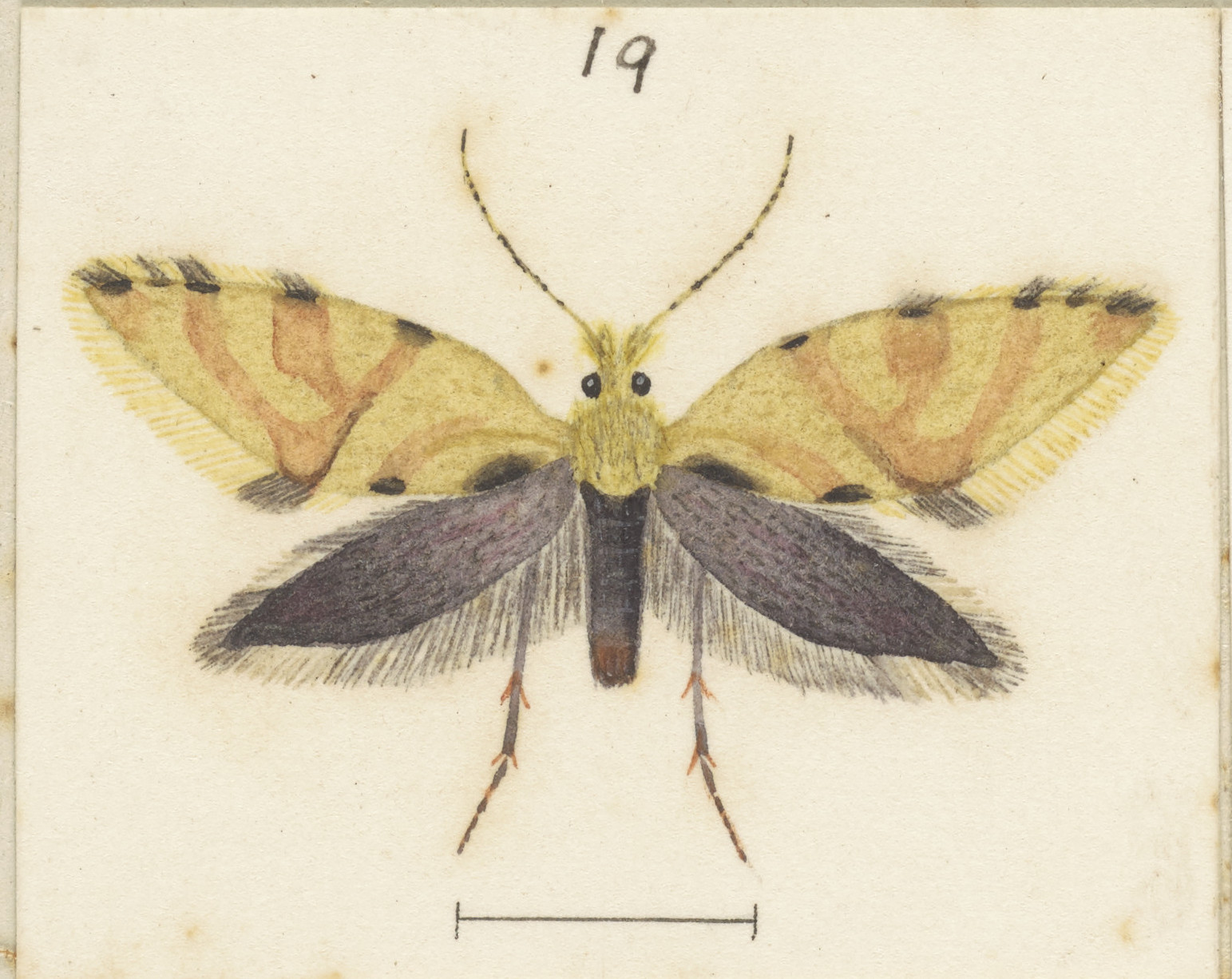
Sabatinca chalcophanes illustrated by George Hudson

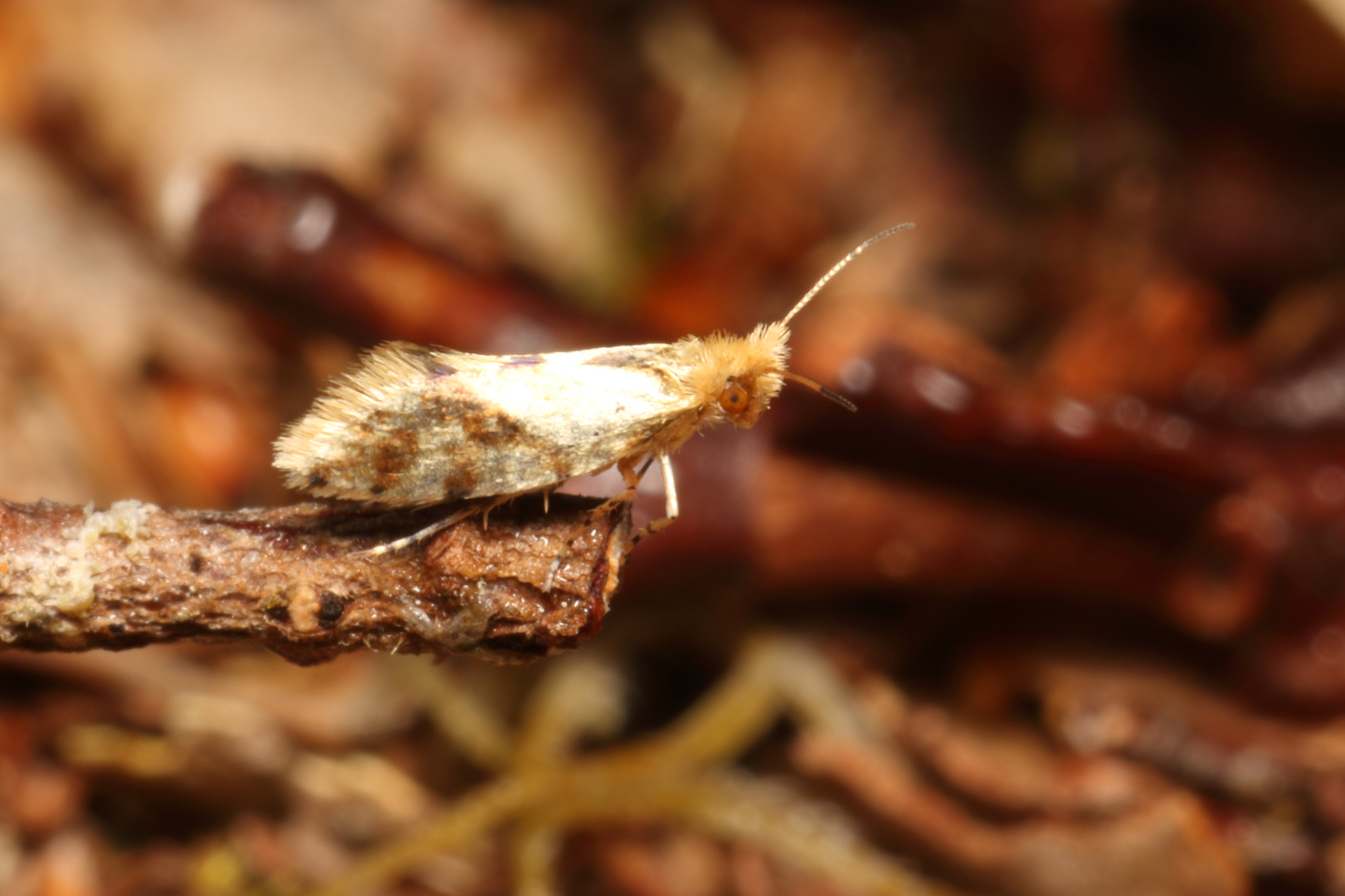
S. chalcophanes at the Tararua Southern Crossing.

Meyrick described the adults of this species as follows:

Male, female. — 10-11 1/2 mm. Head, palpi, and thorax ochreous. Antennae pale ochreous, with about six very variable blackish bands. Abdomen grey. Legs pale ochreous, sharply banded with dark grey. Forewings oblong, costa abruptly bent near base, thence gently arched, apex acute, bindmargin straight, very oblique; light shining yellowish-ochreous, with hardly traceable somewhat darker coppery-shining oblique reticulating fasciae, terminating in small dark purple-fuscous spots on margins; these spots are on costa near base, at 1/3, 2/3, 5/6, and apex, on inner margin near base, at 1/3, 2/3, and anal angle, and on middle of hindmargin; third costal spot often double; cilia shining whitish-oehreous, on costal spots dark fuscous. Hindwings rather dark purple-grey; cilia grey.

The wingspan of this species is approximately 11 millimetres (0.43 in) in length.

== Distribution ==
This species is endemic to New Zealand. It is found in the North Island apart from Northland and in the South Island apart from in the east, south of Queen Charlotte Sound.

== Behaviour ==
The adults of this species are on the wing from November to April. It has been hypothesised that this long flight season may imply this species has two broods.

== Host species and habitat ==
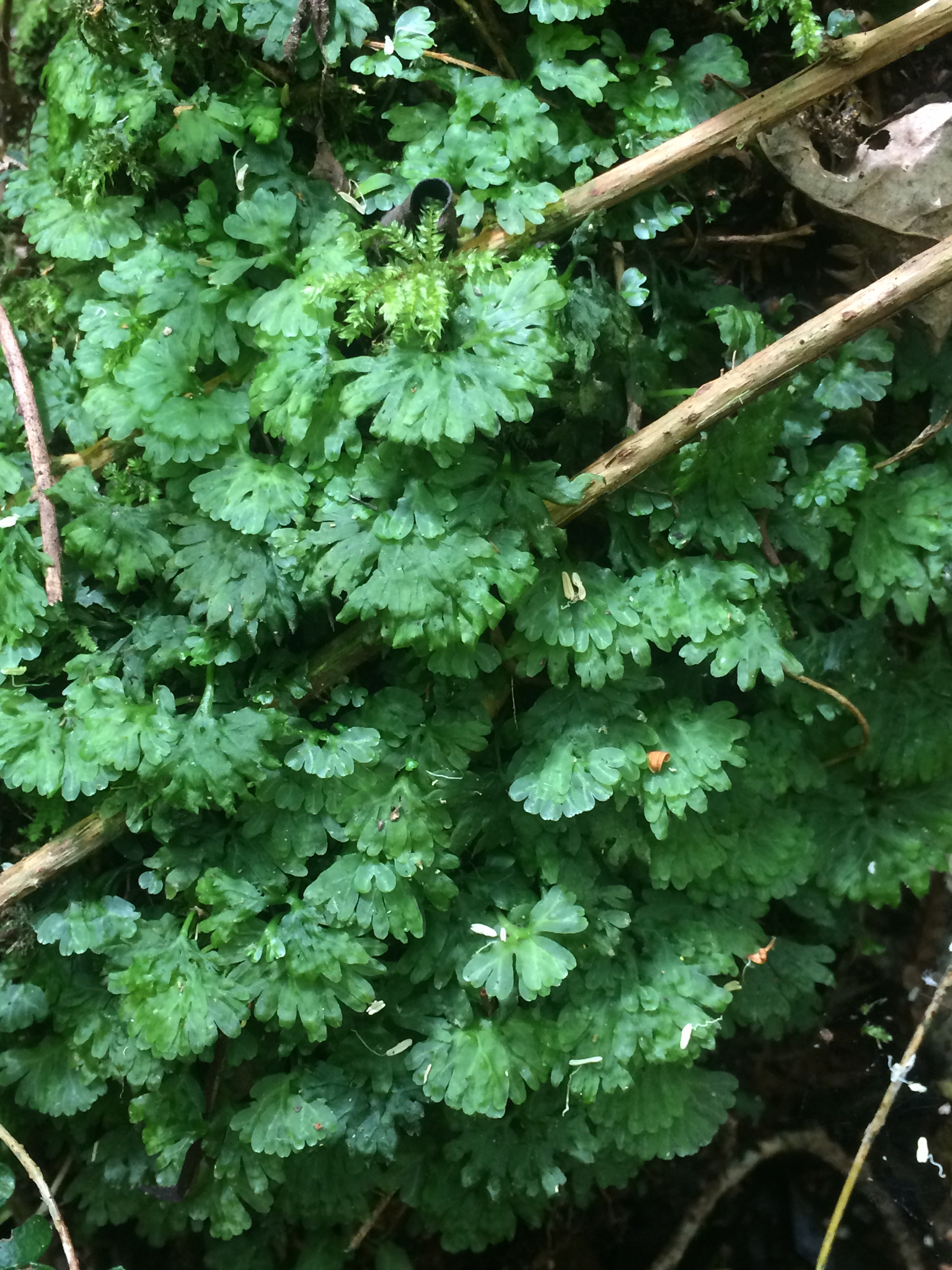
Larval host species Hymenophyton flabellatum

The larvae of this species feeds on Hymenophyton flabellatum as well as likely other foliose liverwort species. Adults are often found near ferns in the genus Pneumatopteris and as a result it has been hypothesised that they feed on spores of those ferns. The preferred habitat of this species is in damp lowland forest.
