= Pneumatopteris truncata =

Conservation status
- Critically endangered (EPBC Act)

Scientific classification
- Kingdom: Plantae
- Clade: Tracheophytes
- Division: Polypodiophyta
- Class: Polypodiopsida
- Order: Polypodiales
- Suborder: Aspleniineae
- Family: Thelypteridaceae
- Genus: Pneumatopteris
- Species: P. truncata

Binomial name
- Pneumatopteris truncata (Poir.) Holttum

Synonyms
- Polypodium truncatum Poir.; Polystichum truncatum (Poir.) Gaudich.; Nephrodium truncatum (Poir.) C.Presl; Dryopteris truncata (Poir.) Kuntze; Pneumatopteris truncata var. truncata

Species of fern

Pneumatopteris truncata, also known as the Christmas Island fern, is a species of terrestrial fern in the Thelypteridaceae family.

== Description ==
The species grows as a large upright fern with 80–120 cm long fronds.

== Distribution and habitat ==
The species is found in various sites in Asia, including India, southern China and Indochina. It also occurs on Christmas Island, an Australian territory in the eastern Indian Ocean, where it inhabits permanently moist sites in deep shade. The extremely small Christmas Island population has been listed as Critically Endangered under Australia's EPBC Act.
