= Pneumatopteris =

Scientific classification
- Kingdom: Plantae
- Clade: Embryophytes
- Clade: Tracheophytes
- Division: Polypodiophyta
- Class: Polypodiopsida
- Order: Polypodiales
- Suborder: Aspleniineae
- Family: Thelypteridaceae
- Subfamily: Thelypteridoideae
- Genus: Pneumatopteris; Nakai

Genus of ferns

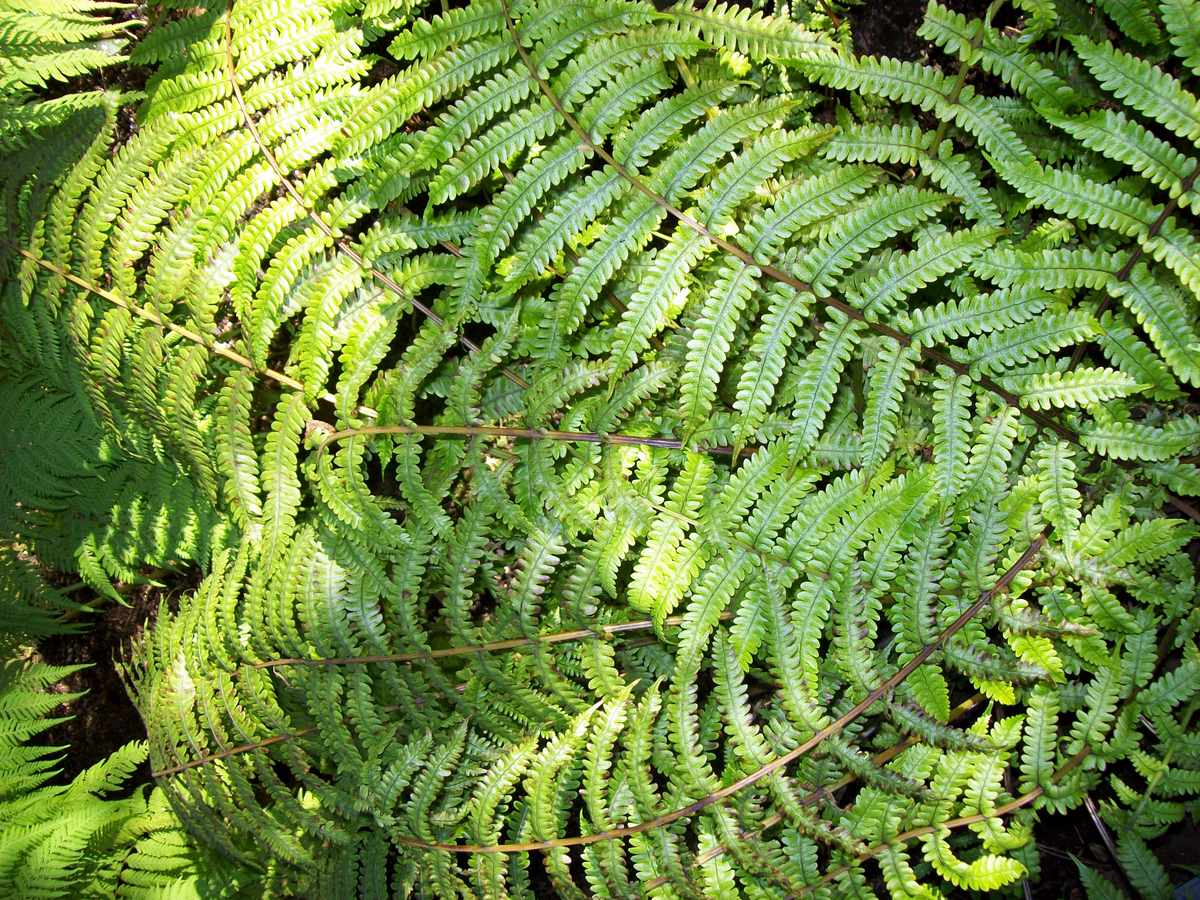
Pneumatopteris pennigera

Pneumatopteris is a genus of about 80 species of terrestrial ferns in the family Thelypteridaceae. The range of the genus extends from tropical Africa, through Asia, Malesia and Australia to the Pacific islands, including Hawaii and New Zealand. It was first described by Japanese botanist Takenoshin Nakai in 1933. The name comes from the Greek pneuma (air, wind or breath), and pteris (a fern), with reference to the aerophores in some species.

== Species ==
- Pneumatopteris afra (Christ) Holttum
- Pneumatopteris costata (Brack.) Holttum
- Pneumatopteris pennigera (G.Forst.) Holttum
- Pneumatopteris sandwicensis
- Pneumatopteris truncata (Poir.) Holttum
