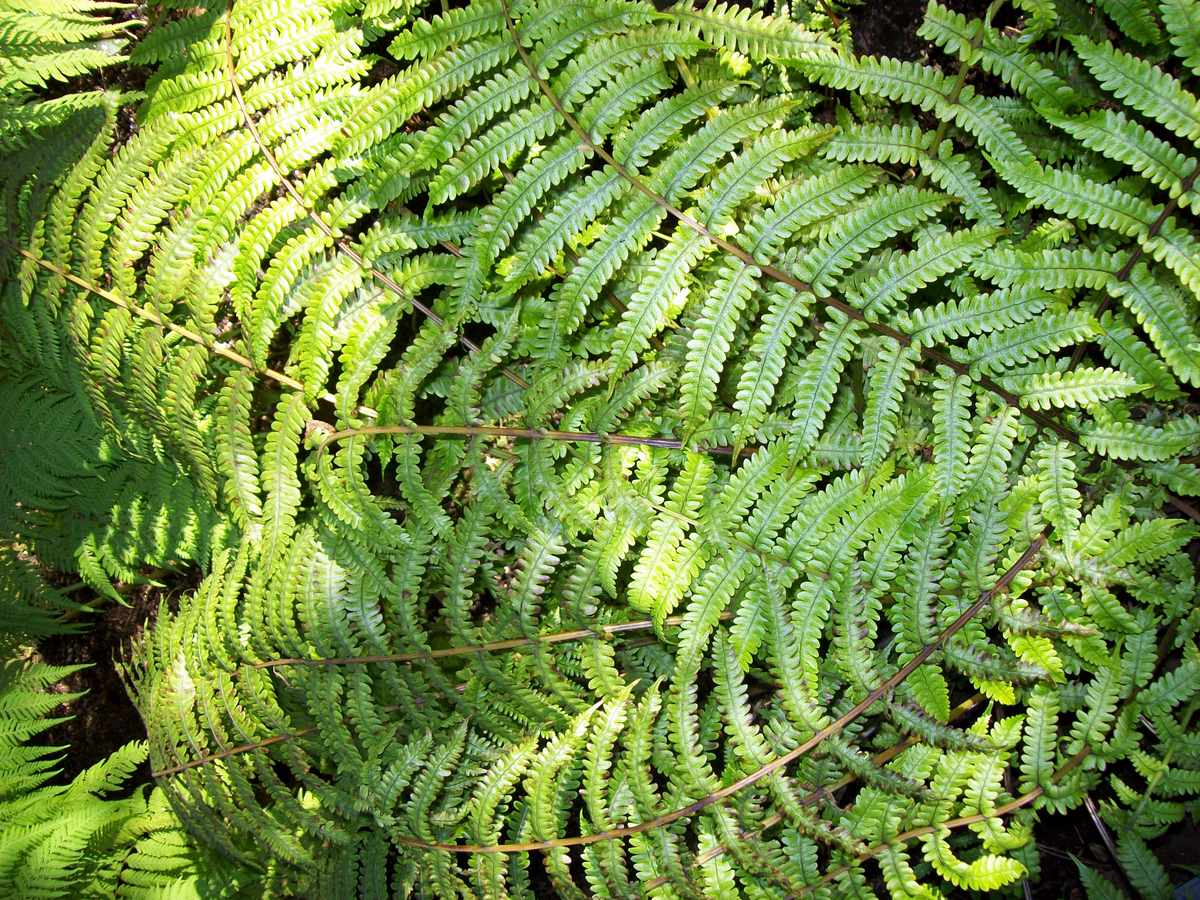

Scientific classification
- Kingdom: Plantae
- Clade: Tracheophytes
- Division: Polypodiophyta
- Class: Polypodiopsida
- Order: Polypodiales
- Suborder: Aspleniineae
- Family: Thelypteridaceae
- Genus: Pakau
- Species: P. pennigera

Binomial name
- Pakau pennigera (G.Forst.) Holttum

Synonyms
- Pneumatopteris pennigera

= Pakau pennigera =

Lime fern

Species of fern

Pakau pennigera, commonly known as lime fern, gully fern, feather fern and piupiu, is a small fern found in south eastern Australia and New Zealand. It grows along streams, and is also seen in areas of open forest.

This fern is found in Tasmania, Victoria and New Zealand. There is a record of it occurring in the northern Australian state of Queensland. But there is not a reliable record of it occurring in New South Wales, which is south of Queensland and north of the other locations where this plant is known to exist.
