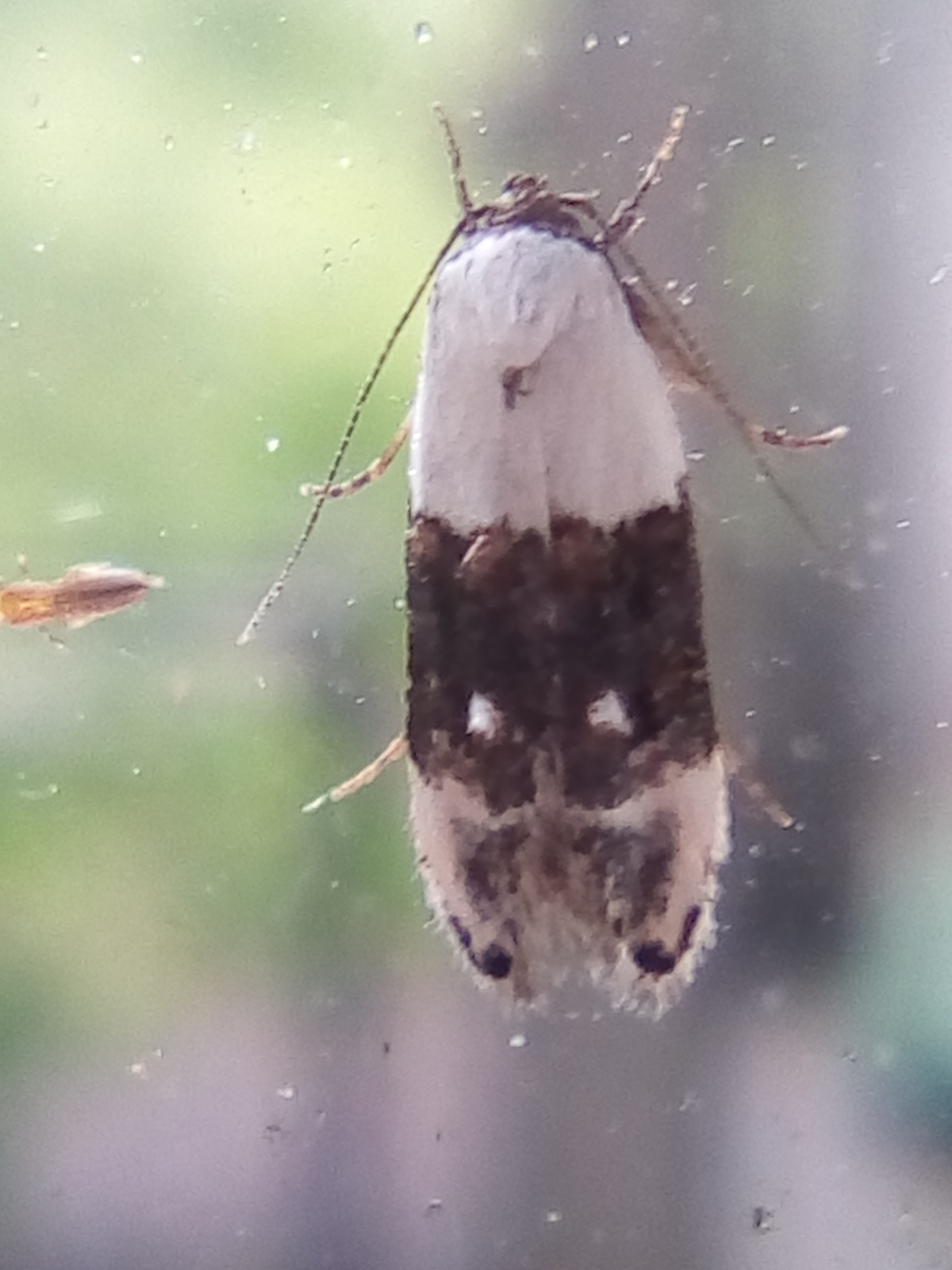

Scientific classification
- Kingdom: Animalia
- Phylum: Arthropoda
- Class: Insecta
- Order: Lepidoptera
- Family: Oecophoridae
- Genus: Trachypepla
- Species: T. amphileuca

Binomial name
- Trachypepla amphileuca Meyrick, 1914

= Trachypepla amphileuca =

Species of moth endemic to New Zealand

Trachypepla amphileuca is a species of moth in the family Oecophoridae. It is endemic to New Zealand and has been observed in the North Island. This species inhabits native forest. Adults are on the wing from October to January and are attracted to light. The wing pattern of T. amphileuca is said to imitate the appearance of bird droppings.

== Taxonomy ==
This species was first described in 1914 by Edward Meyrick and named Trachypepla amphileuca using a specimen collected in Wainuiomata by George Hudson in December. In 1928 George Hudson discussed and illustrated this species in his book The butterflies and moths of New Zealand. The male holotype specimen is held at the Natural History Museum, London.

== Description ==
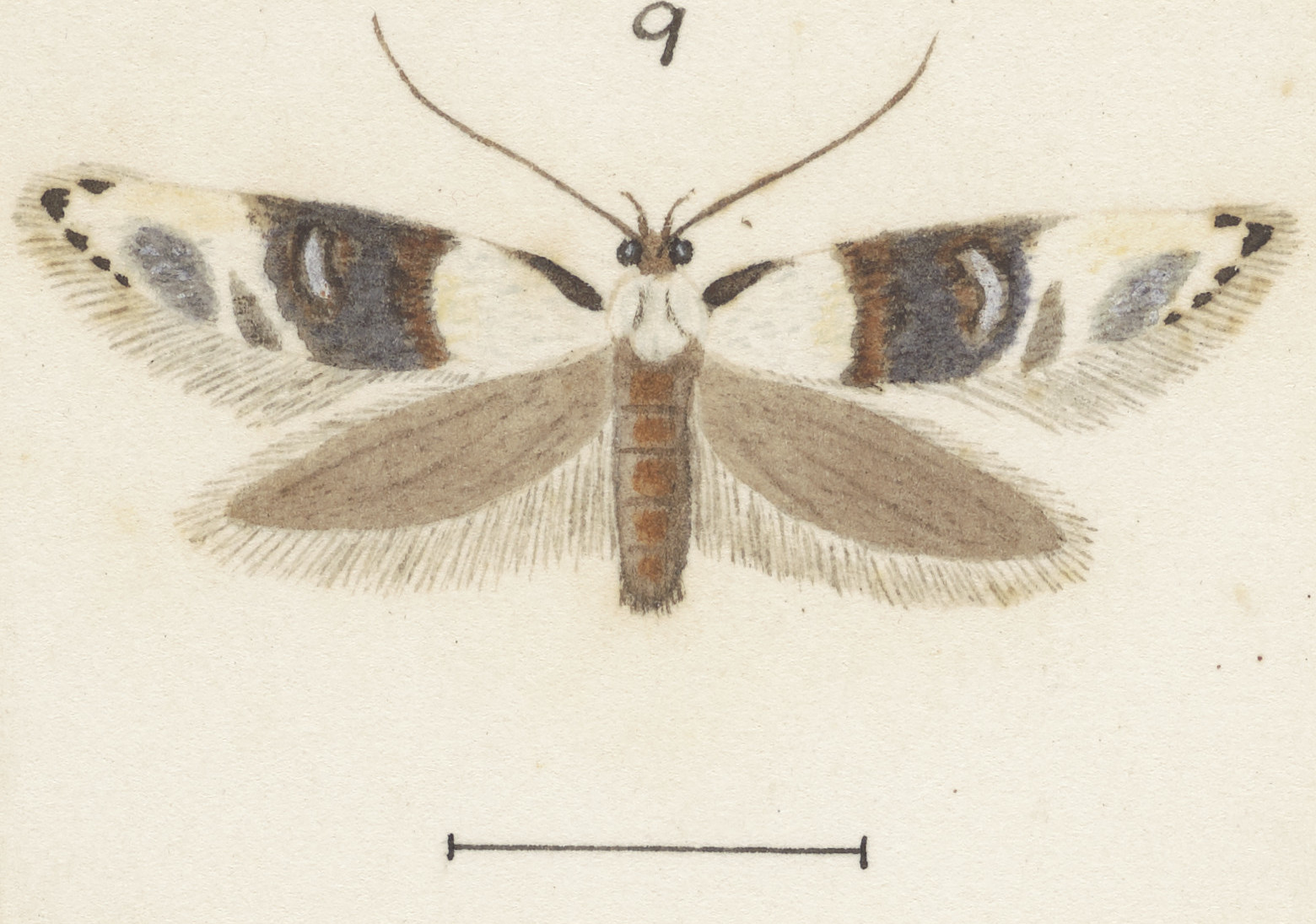
Illustration by G. Hudson.

Meyrick described the adult male of the species as follows:

♂. 16 mm. Head fuscous. Palpi dark fuscous sprinkled with whitish. Antennal ciliations 1. Thorax white, anterior margin narrowly dark fuscous. Abdomen light grey, anal tuft whitish-ochreous. Fore wings elongate, rather narrow, costa moderately arched, apex obtuse, termen very obliquely rounded; white, with a very faint ochreous tinge; a dark-fuscous wedge-shaped spot along basal sixth of costa; a broad direct transverse dark-grey band occupying median third, anterior edge slightly concave, posterior slightly convex and somewhat excavated above middle; within this band are two tufts almost on anterior edge representing first discal and plical stigmata, and a crescentic transverse white dark-edged mark towards posterior edge; a suffused grey patch towards lower part of termen, touching tornus; a small black apical spot, preceded by a large black dot on costa and three on termen : cilia grey, round apex with base white. Hindwings grey; cilia pale grey, darker towards base.

Hudson was of the opinion that the wing pattern of T. amphileuca imitates the appearance of bird droppings.

== Distribution ==
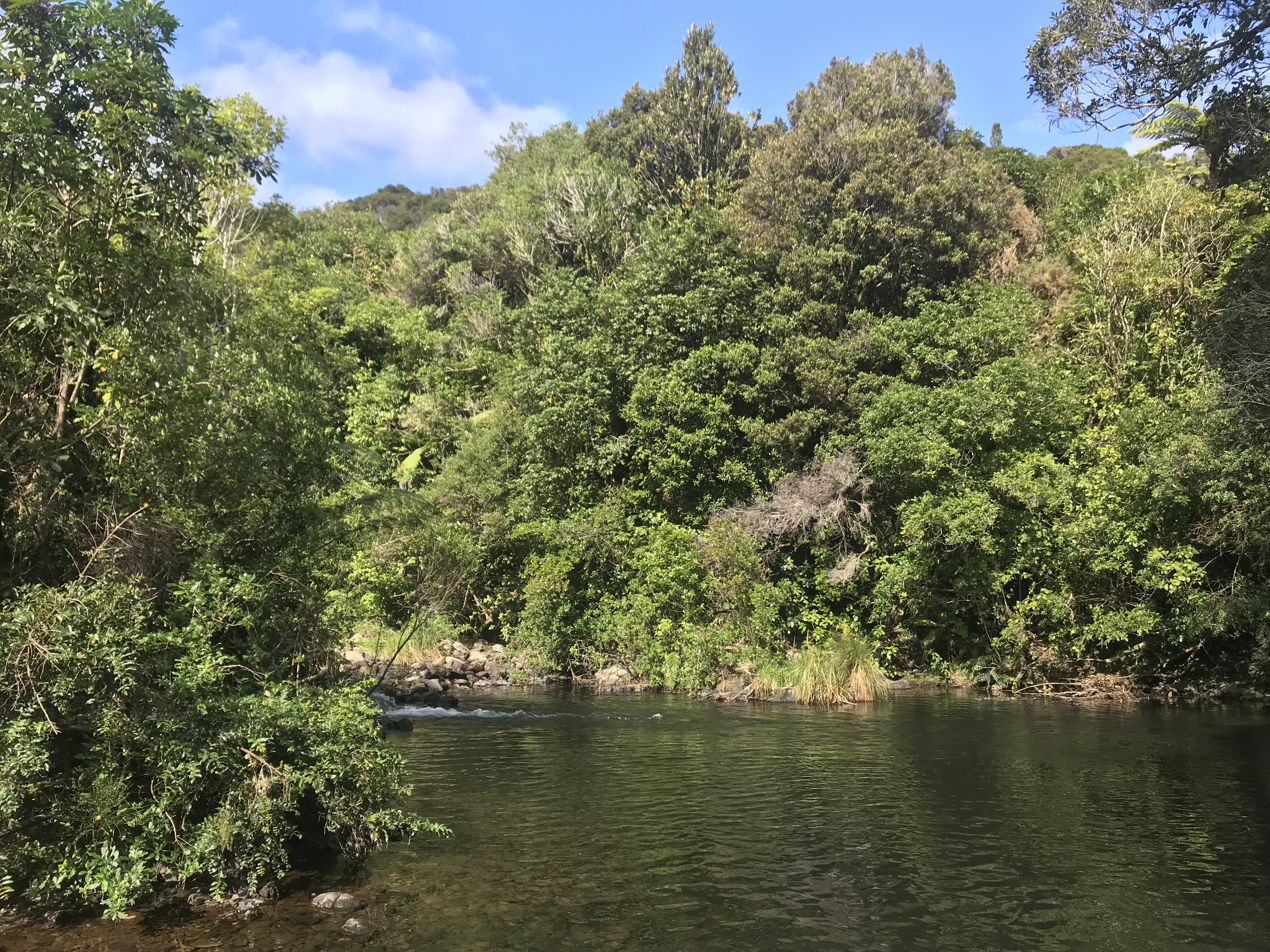
Habitat near Wainuiomata, type locality of this species.

This species is endemic to New Zealand and has been observed in the North Island. It has been observed or collected in the Wellington, Hawkes Bay, Waikato and Auckland regions. It has previously been regarded as scarce in the Hawkes Bay although in more recently published literature this species is said to be common in Albany, Auckland.

== Habitat ==
T. amphileuca inhabits native forest.

== Behaviour ==
Adults have been observed on the wing from October to January. Adults are attracted to light and have been collected using light traps.
