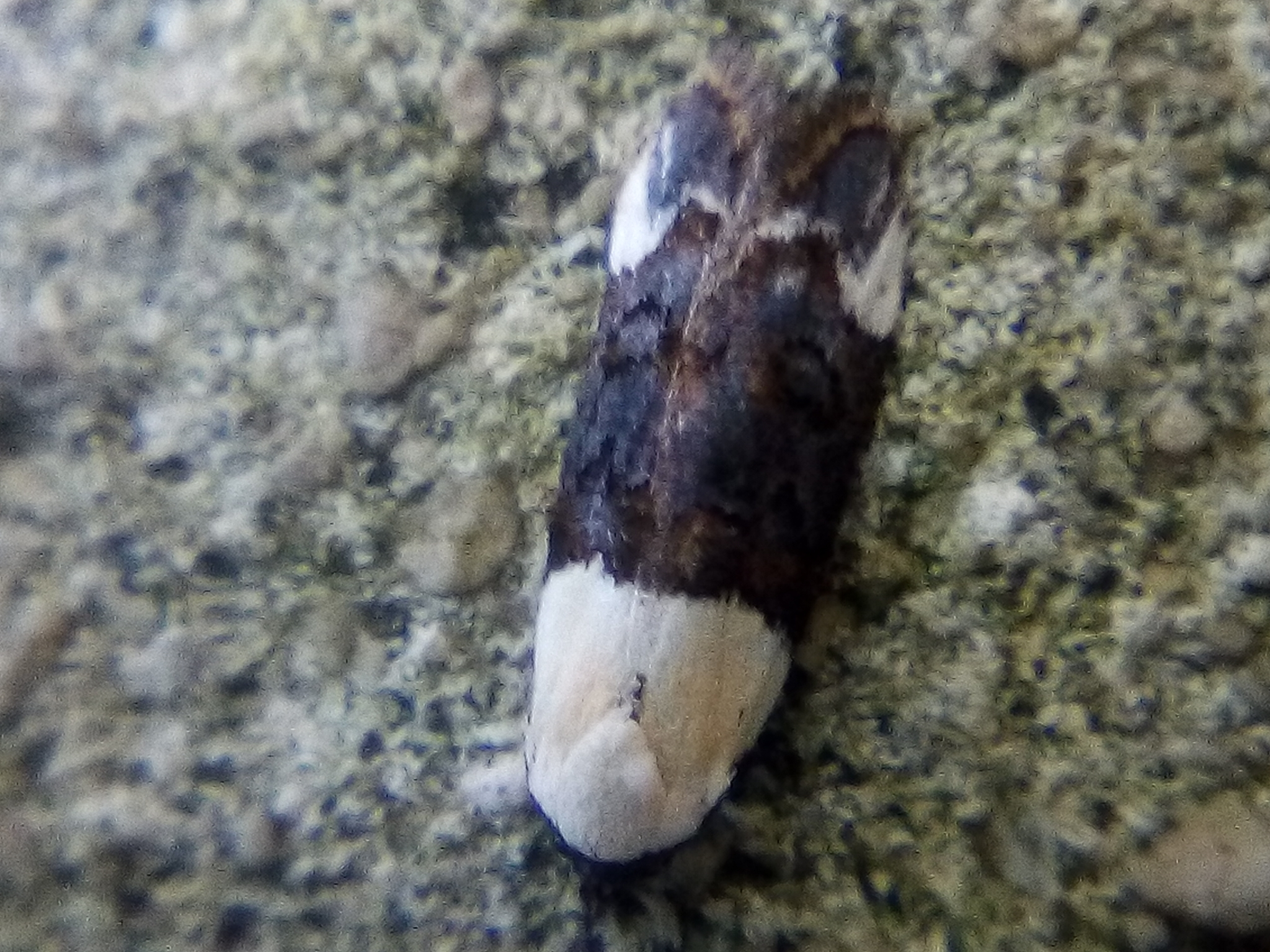
- Trachypepla euryleucota

Scientific classification
- Kingdom: Animalia
- Phylum: Arthropoda
- Class: Insecta
- Order: Lepidoptera
- Family: Oecophoridae
- Genus: Trachypepla; Meyrick, 1883

Type species
- Trachypepla euryleucota Meyrick, 1883

= Trachypepla =

Genus of moths

Trachypepla is a genus of moths of the family Oecophoridae. It was circumscribed in 1883 by Edward Meyrick. The species within this genus are indigenous to Australia and New Zealand.

It consists of the following species:

- Trachypepla amphileuca Meyrick, 1914
- Trachypepla anastrella Meyrick, 1883
- Trachypepla angularis (Philpott, 1929)
- Trachypepla aspidephora Meyrick, 1883
- Trachypepla capsellata Meyrick, 1913
- Trachypepla charierga Meyrick, 1889
- Trachypepla chloratma Meyrick, 1916
- Trachypepla conspicuella (Walker, 1864)
- Trachypepla contritella (Walker, 1864)
- Trachypepla cyphonias Meyrick, 1927
- Trachypepla dasylopha Lower, 1920
- Trachypepla diplospila Turner, 1935
- Trachypepla eumenopa Meyrick, 1926
- Trachypepla euryleucota Meyrick, 1883
- Trachypepla festiva Philpott, 1930
- Trachypepla galaxias Meyrick, 1883
- Trachypepla glebifera Turner, 1927
- Trachypepla haemalea Turner, 1916
- Trachypepla hemicarpa Meyrick, 1887
- Trachypepla hieropis Meyrick, 1892
- Trachypepla importuna Meyrick, 1914
- Trachypepla indolescens Meyrick, 1927
- Trachypepla ingenua Meyrick, 1911
- Trachypepla lasiocephala Lower, 1916
- Trachypepla lathriopa Meyrick, 1905
- Trachypepla leucoplanetis Meyrick, 1883
- Trachypepla lichenodes Meyrick, 1883
- Trachypepla minuta Philpott, 1931
- Trachypepla nimbosa Philpott, 1930
- Trachypepla nyctopis Meyrick, 1883
- Trachypepla ocneropis Meyrick, 1936
- Trachypepla peplasmena Turner, 1935
- Trachypepla phaeolopha Turner, 1935
- Trachypepla photinella (Meyrick, 1883)
- Trachypepla picimacula Turner, 1935
- Trachypepla picromorpha Meyrick, 1928
- Trachypepla poliochroa Turner, 1898
- Trachypepla protochlora Meyrick, 1883
- Trachypepla roseata Philpott, 1923
- Trachypepla semilauta Philpott, 1918
- Trachypepla spartodeta Meyrick, 1883
- Trachypepla stenota Meyrick, 1889
