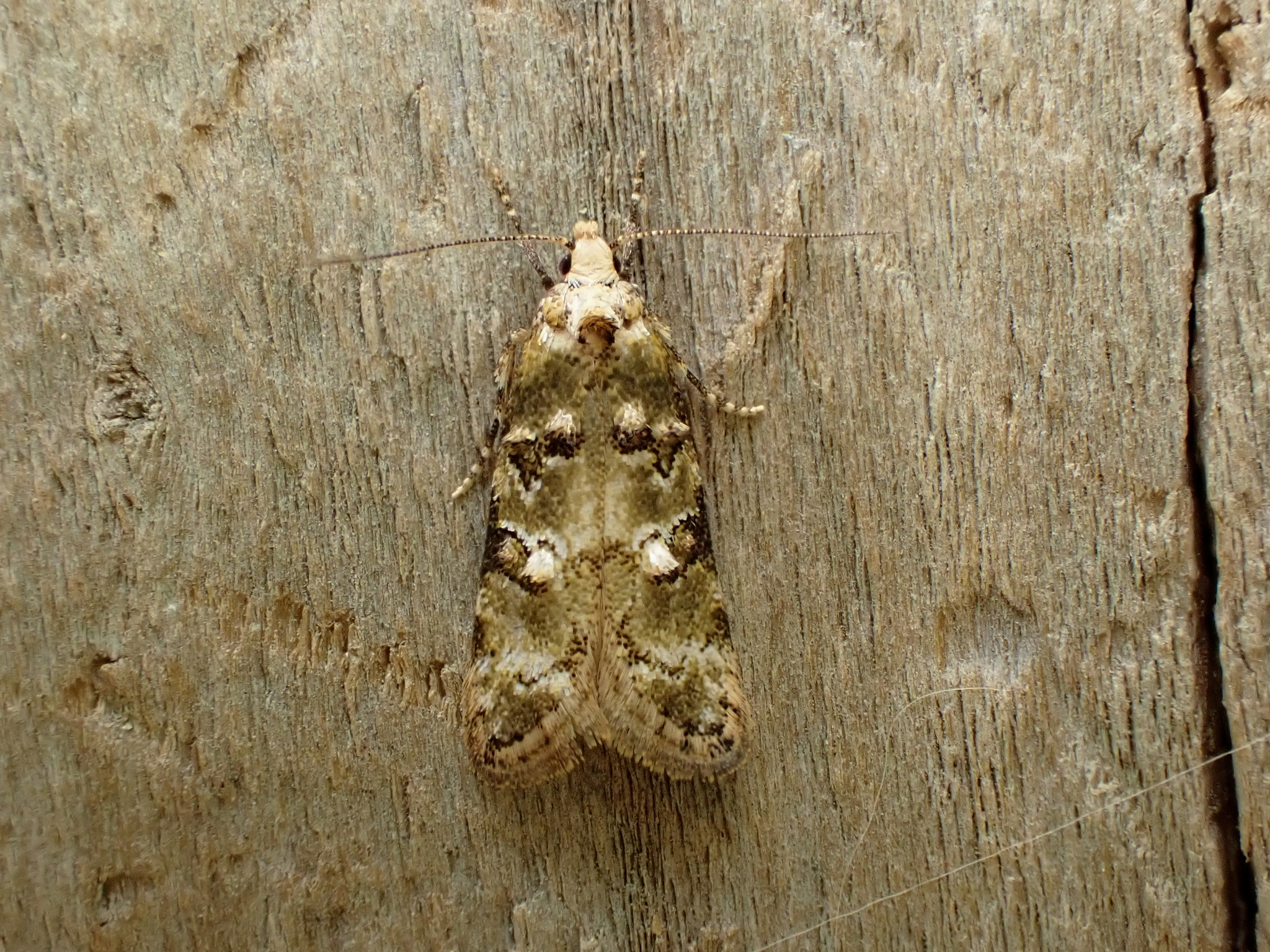

Scientific classification
- Kingdom: Animalia
- Phylum: Arthropoda
- Class: Insecta
- Order: Lepidoptera
- Family: Oecophoridae
- Genus: Trachypepla
- Species: T. protochlora

Binomial name
- Trachypepla protochlora Meyrick, 1883

= Trachypepla protochlora =

Species of moth endemic to New Zealand

Trachypepla protochlora is a moth of the family Oecophoridae first described by Edward Meyrick in 1883. It is endemic to New Zealand and is found in both the North and South Islands. The preferred habitat of this species is native forest and adults are on the wing from October until February. Adults can be variable in their green shaded colour as well as in the intensity of markings on their forewings. The greenish ground colouration of this moth ensures they are well camouflaged when at rest on green mosses and lichens.

== Taxonomy ==
This species was first described by Edward Meyrick in 1883 using specimens collected at Palmerston and at the foot of Otira Gorge in January and February. A fuller description of this species was given by Meyrick in 1884. The male genitalia of this species was studied and illustrated by Alfred Philpott in 1927. George Hudson discussed and illustrated this species in his 1928 book The butterflies and moths of New Zealand. The male lectotype, collected at Otira Gorge, is held at the Natural History Museum, London.

== Description ==
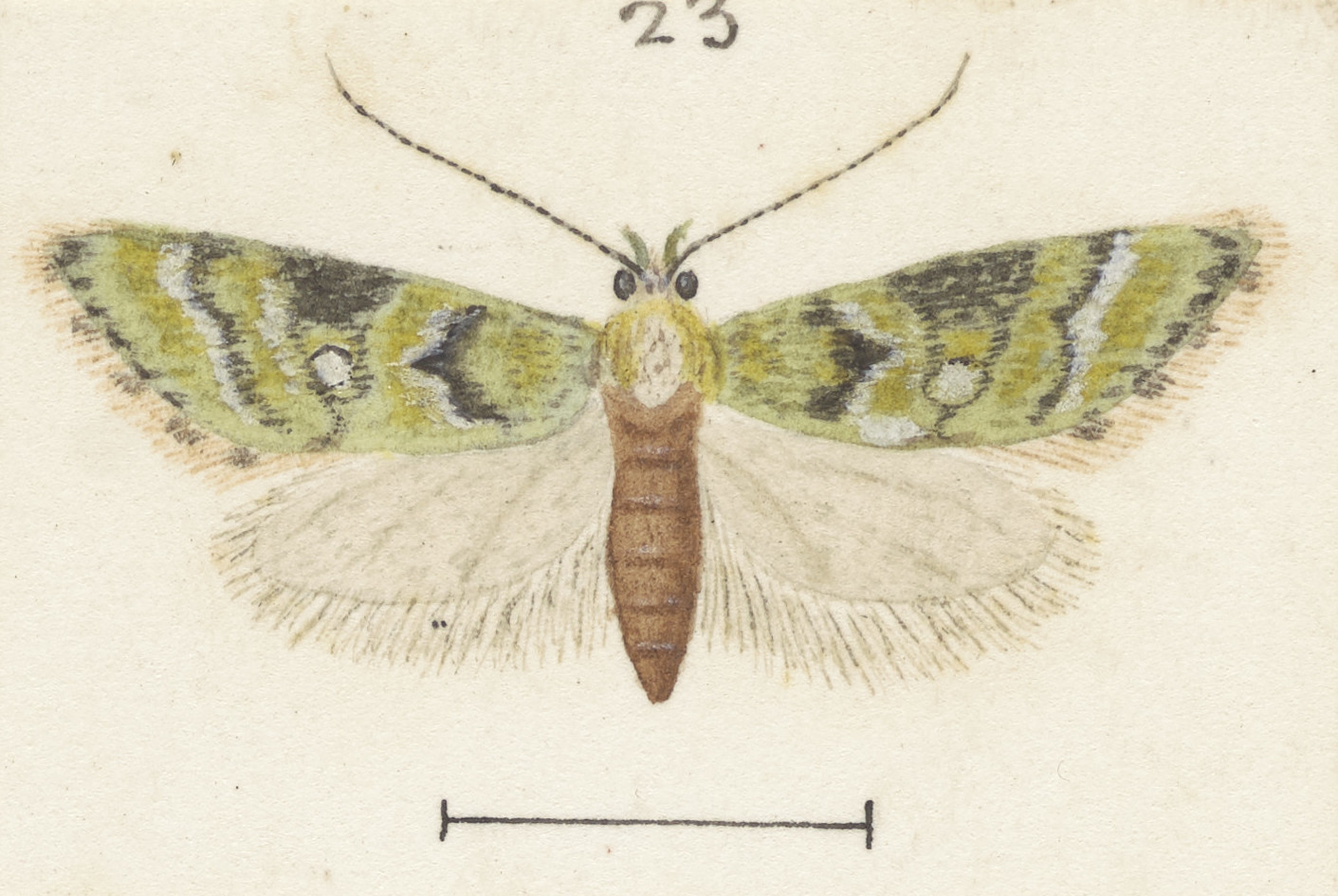
Illustration of female by Hudson.

Meyrick described this species as follows:

Male. — 13 1/2-14 1/2 mm. Head, pale whitish-ochreous. Palpi ochreous-whitish, second joint dark fuscous on basal half, terminal joint with a dark fuscous subapical ring. Antenna? dark fuscous. Thorax ochreous-whitish, anterior margin suffused with dark grey. Abdomen light ochreous-grey, anal tuft ochreous. Legs dark fuscous, middle tibiae with whitish central and apical rings, posterior tibiae grey-whitish above, all tarsi with whitish rings at apex of joints. Forewings elongate, costa moderately arched, apex round-pointed, hindmargin very obliquely rounded; whitish, with numerous scattered ochreous-green scales, forming an irregular suffusion, and also partially suffused with light greyish; a small blackish spot at base of costa; basal third of costa dark grey : a slender sharply defined black line from 1/4 of costa to 1/3 of inner margin, very acutely angulated outwards in middle, becoming obsolete on margins, preceded by a tuft of raised scales above and below middle; a small triangular dark grey patch on middle of costa, beneath which are two raised tufts of scales almost completely margined with black, upper one greenish, lower white; lower tuft almost connected with inner margin beyond middle by some black scales; a small cloudy grey spot on costa at 3/4, whence a partially obsolete blackish line proceeds to anal angle, sharply angulated inwards beneath costa; a cloudy grey spot on upper half of hindmargin; two or three ill-defined blackish dots round apex, sometimes confluent : cilia grey- whitish, greenish-tinged, with a cloudy grey line obscurely spotted with blackish. Hindwings grey; cilia grey-whitish, with a cloudy grey line.

The green shaded colouring and the intensity of markings on the forewings of this moth are variable. The greenish ground colour of this moth ensures it is well camouflaged when at rest on mosses and green lichens.

== Distribution ==
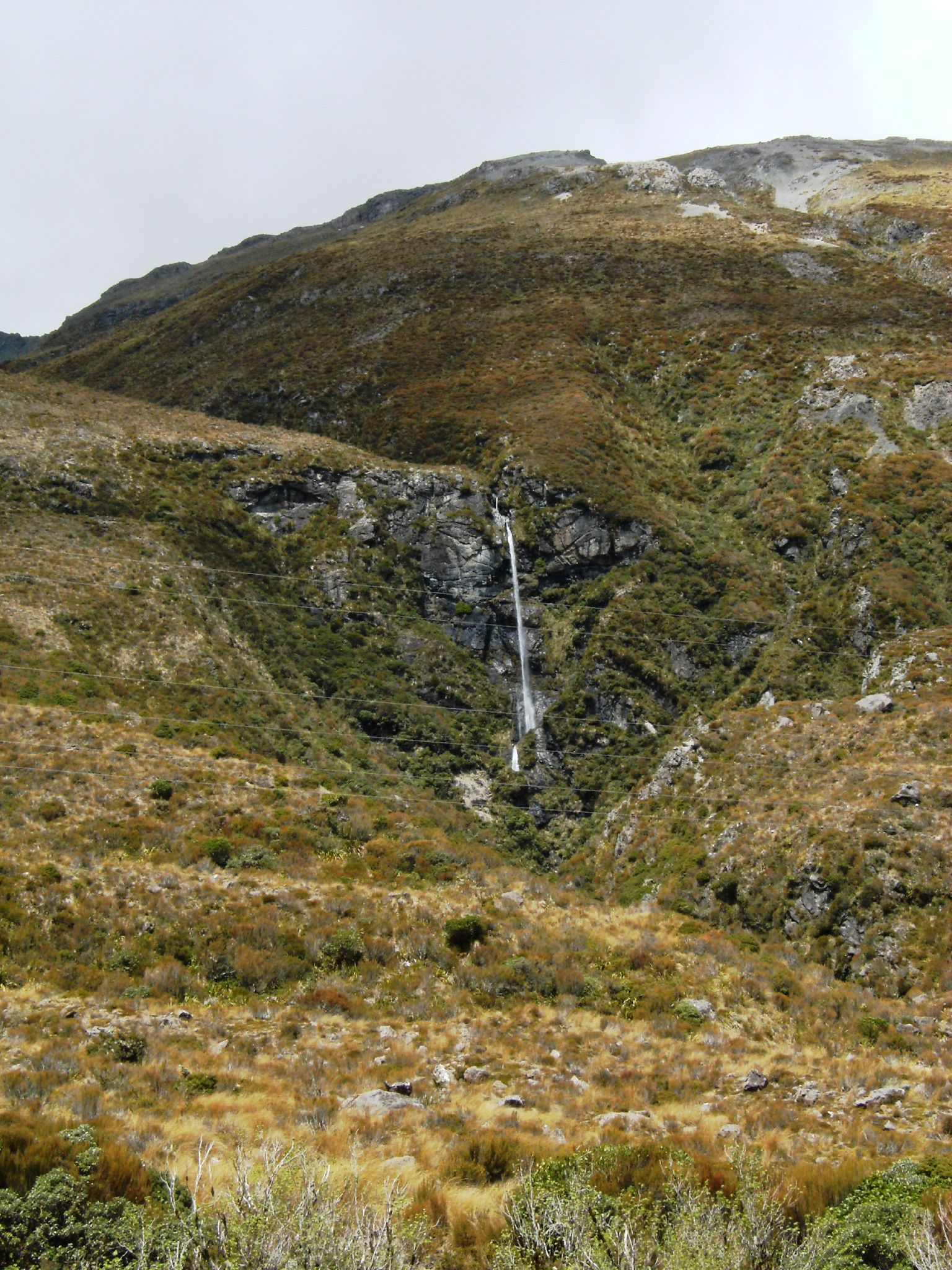
Otira Gorge, type locality of T. protochlora.

T. protochlora is endemic to New Zealand. This species has been recorded in both the North and South Islands including in Auckland, at National Park, Mount Taranaki, Palmerston North, Wellington, Otira Gorge and Invercargill. Hudson believed it to be a rare species in the North Island but relatively common in the southern parts of the South Island.

== Habitat ==
The preferred habitat of T. protochlora is native forest.

== Behaviour ==
The adults of this species have been observed being on the wing from October until February. This species has been collected by beating foliage.
