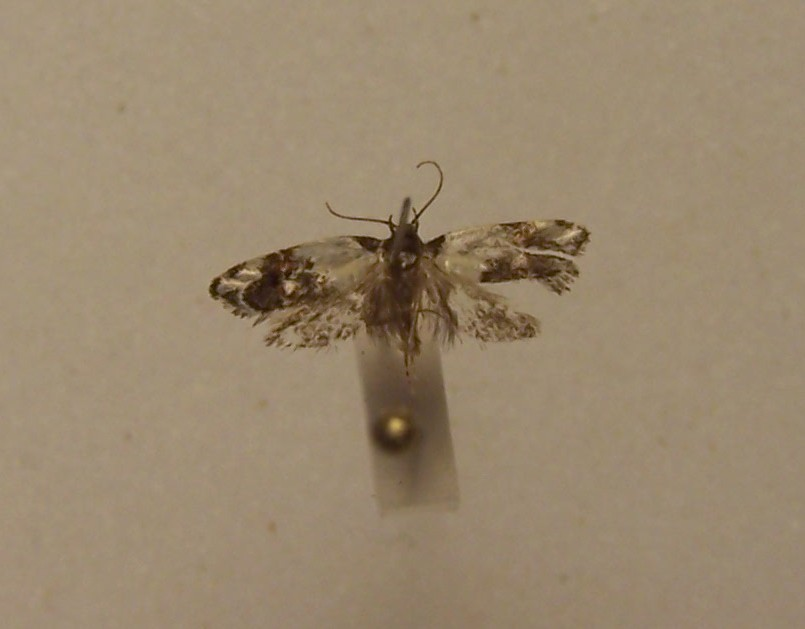

Scientific classification
- Kingdom: Animalia
- Phylum: Arthropoda
- Class: Insecta
- Order: Lepidoptera
- Family: Oecophoridae
- Genus: Trachypepla
- Species: T. leucoplanetis

Binomial name
- Trachypepla leucoplanetis Meyrick, 1883

= Trachypepla leucoplanetis =

Species of moth endemic to New Zealand

Trachypepla leucoplanetis is a moth of the family Oecophoridae first described by Edward Meyrick in 1883. It is endemic to New Zealand and has been collected in both the North and South Islands. It is the smallest moth species in the genus Trachypepla and the patterns on the forewings of adults are variable in appearance. It inhabits native forest and bush and the larvae feed on leaf litter. Adults are on the wing from October until February. T. leucoplanetis is regarded as being rarely observed and has been collected via the beating of foliage.

== Taxonomy ==
This species was first described by Edward Meyrick in 1883 using specimens collected in dense forest in Hamilton and at Otira Gorge. A fuller description of this species was given by Meyrick in 1884. The male genitalia of this species was studied and illustrated by Alfred Philpott in 1927. George Hudson discussed and illustrated this species in his 1928 book The butterflies and moths of New Zealand. The male lectotype, collected in Hamilton, is held at the Natural History Museum, London.

== Description ==
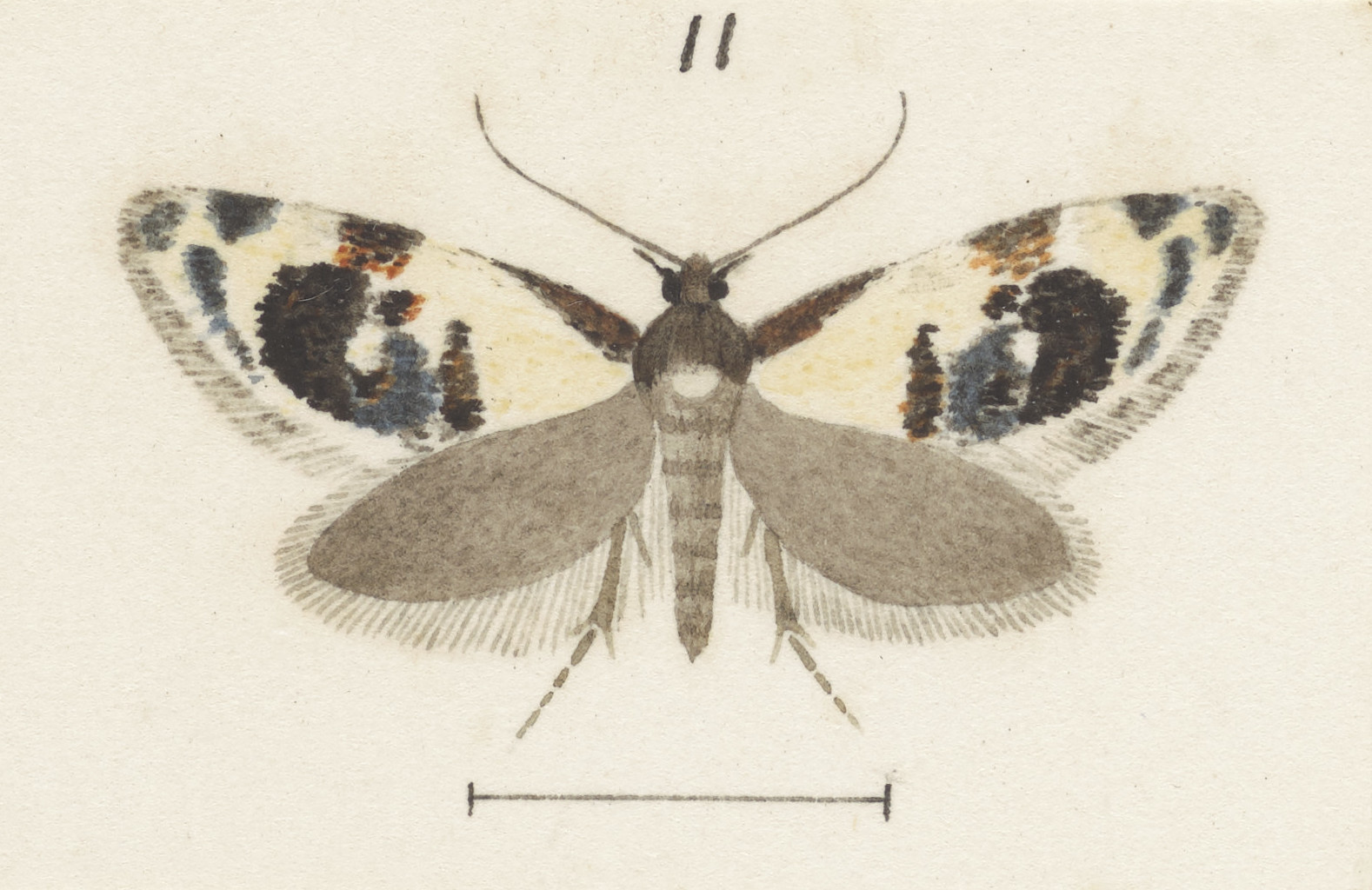
Illustration of male by Hudson.

Meyrick described this species as follows:

Male. 11-12 1/2- mm. Head dark fuscous, face white. Palpi dark fuscous mixed with white, internally whitish. Antennae dark fuscous. Thorax dark fuscous, posteriorly mixed with white. Abdomen whitish-grey. Legs dark fuscous, middle tibiae with central and apical whitish rings, posterior tibiae whitish, all tarsi with whitish rings at apex of joints. Forewings moderate or rather short, costa moderately arched, apex round-pointed, hindmargin obliquely rounded; white, very faintly ochreous-tinged in disc; base of costa dark fuscous, dilating basally to touch inner margin; a large fuscous-grey transverse patch, its inner edge nearly straight, extending from middle of costa to middle of inner margin, outer edge convex below middle, extending from f of costa to middle of hindmargin, margins irregularly mixed with blackish, and containing some white scales in disc and towards anal angle, and some spots of raised ferruginous scales partially margined with blackish; a grey spot on costa before apex, and a small irregular grey patch extending along upper part of hindmargin : cilia grey, white at base along hindmargin and below anal angle. Hindwings grey, apex darker; cilia grey.

This species is the smallest in the genus Trachypepla and can be variable in the markings on the forewings. The colouration of the forewings of this species camouflages the insect when at rest as it gives the appearance of a small bird dropping.

== Distribution ==
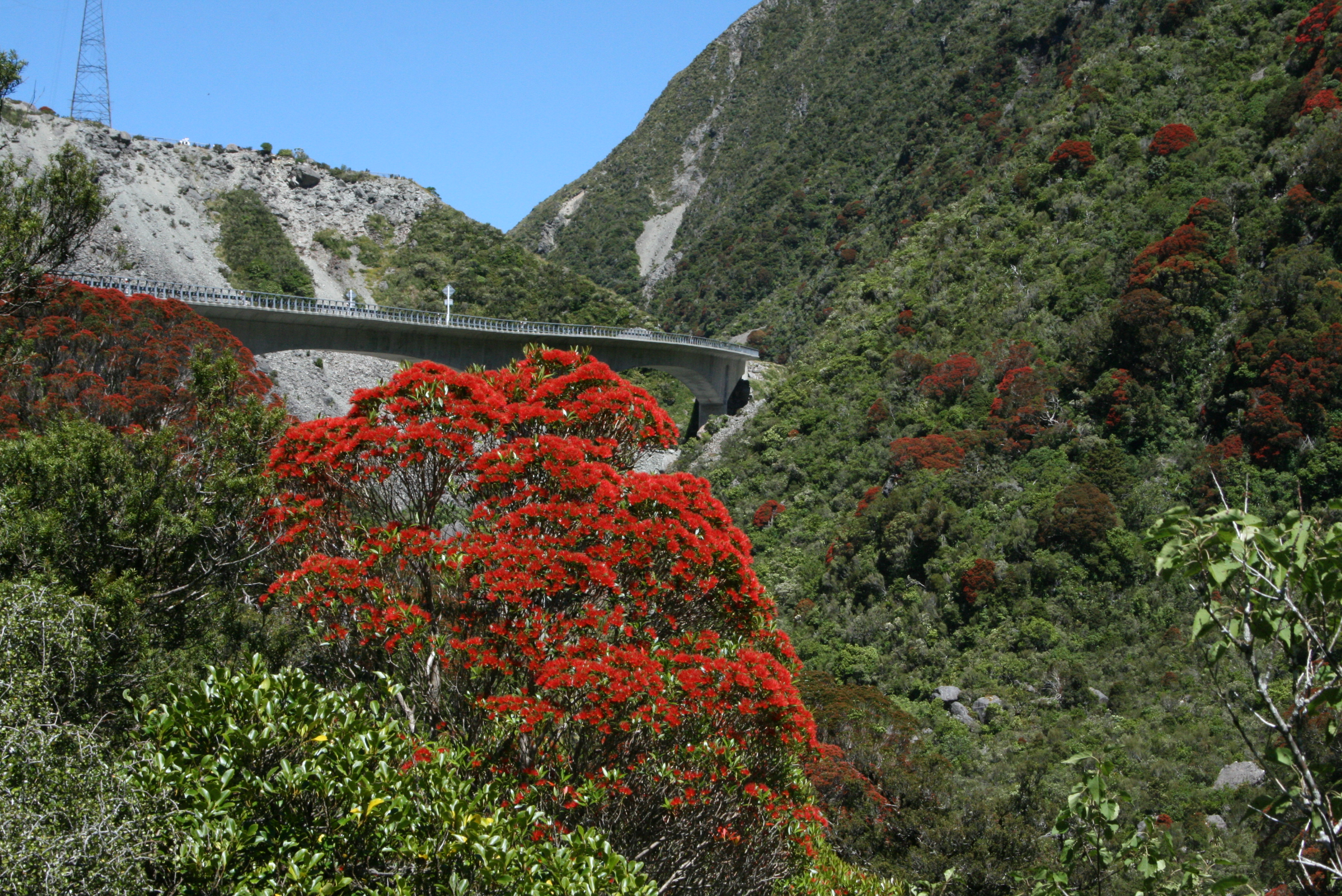
Otira gorge, habitat of T. leucoplanetis.

This species is endemic to New Zealand. It has been found on both the North and South Islands, including in Auckland, Hamilton, National Park, Wellington, at the Ōtira River and on Mount Arthur's lower slopes. Both T. H. Davies and George Hudson were of the opinion that this species is rarely observed.

== Habitat and hosts ==
The preferred habitat of T. leucoplanetis is native forest. Larvae of this species feed on leaf litter.

== Behaviour ==
Adults of this species are on the wing from October until February. This species has been collected by beating foliage.
