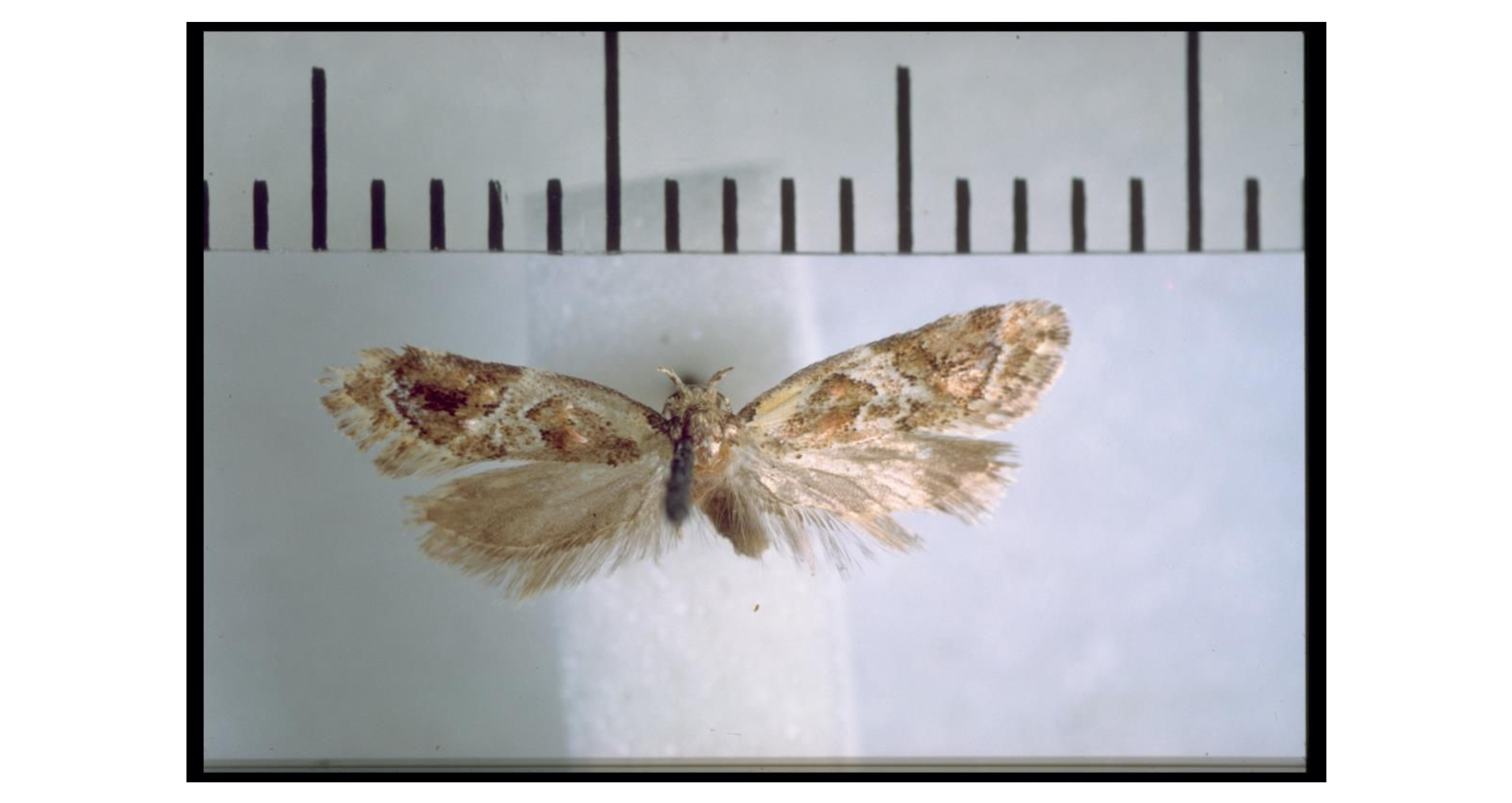
- Male holotype

Conservation status
- Data Deficit (NZ TCS)

Scientific classification
- Kingdom: Animalia
- Phylum: Arthropoda
- Clade: Pancrustacea
- Class: Insecta
- Order: Lepidoptera
- Family: Oecophoridae
- Genus: Trachypepla
- Species: T. roseata

Binomial name
- Trachypepla roseata Philpott, 1923

= Trachypepla roseata =

Species of moth endemic to New Zealand

Trachypepla roseata is a species of moth in the family Oecophoridae. This species is endemic to New Zealand and is found in the Nelson and Tasman regions of the South Island. It frequents forest habitat and is on the wing in January. In 2025, following the same classification in 2015, this species was classified as "data deficient" under the New Zealand Threat Classification System.

== Taxonomy ==
It was described by Alfred Philpott in 1923 using a specimen he collected at the Dun Mountain in Nelson in January. George Hudson had previously discovered the species in Tākaka. Hudson discussed and illustrated this species in his 1928 publication The Butterflies and Moths of New Zealand. The holotype is held at the New Zealand Arthropod Collection.

== Description ==
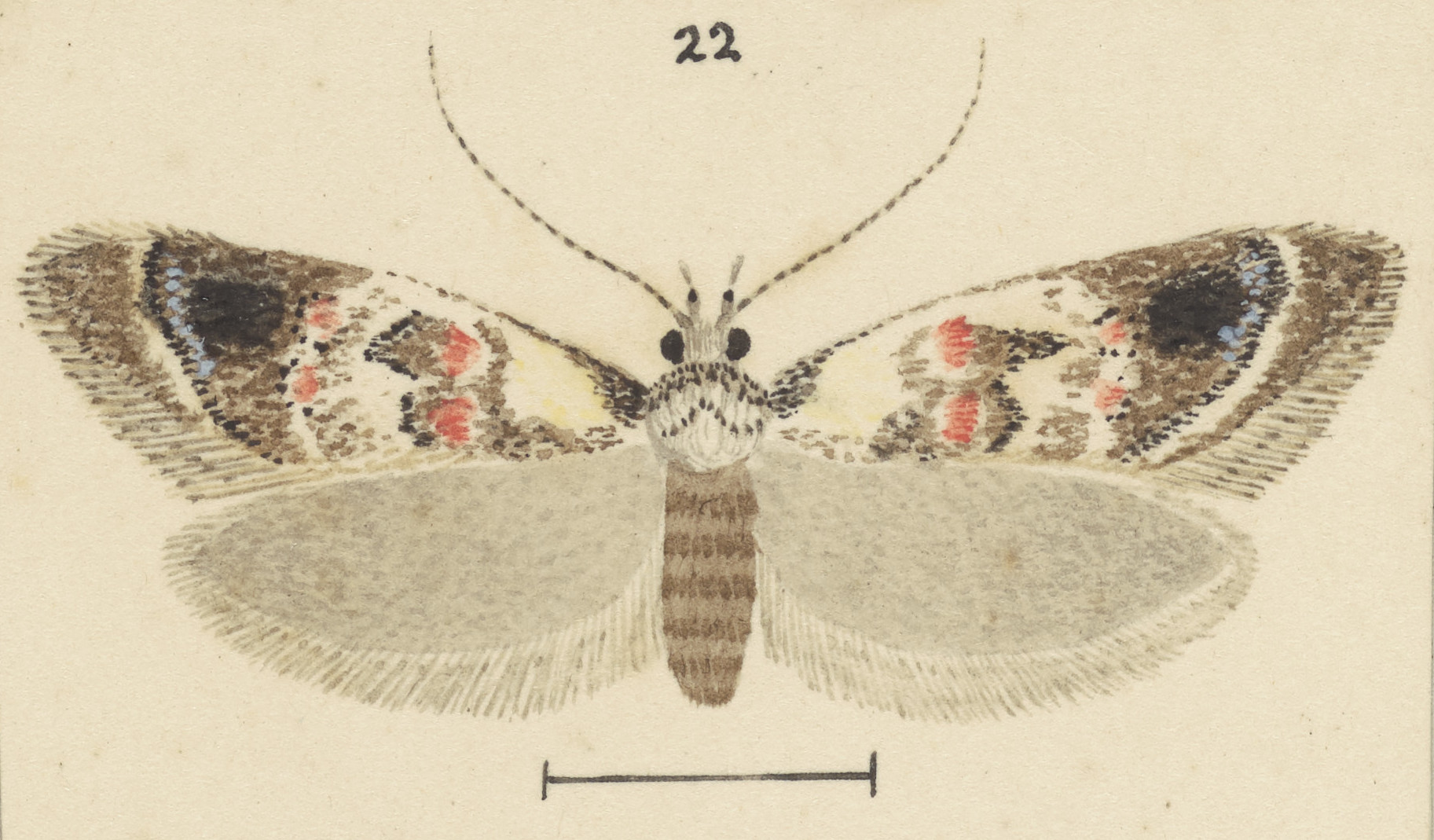
Illustration of female

Philpott described the species as follows:

♂ 13 mm. Head white mixed with brown. Palpi whitish, second segment outwardly mixed with brownish-black, terminal segment with a subapical ring and some scattered scales brownish-black. Antennae brown, ciliations 1. Thorax brown mixed with white. Abdomen greyish-ochreous. Legs ochreous, tarsi banded with fuscous. Forewings moderate, apex rounded, termen oblique; greyish-brown sprinkled with dark fuscous; a small black blotch on costa at base followed by a whitish area slightly tinged with ochreous; two tufts of rosy-pink scales at about 1/4, the second obliquely above the first; a broad whitish band, enclosing some fuscous colouring, from costa at 2/5 to dorsum at 1/3, strongly excurved; second line thin, sharply angulated outwards beneath costa, white, anteriorly margined with black on lower 2/3: cilia fuscous mixed with white. Hindwings greyish-fuscous: cilia greyish-fuscous, tips whitish.

== Distribution ==
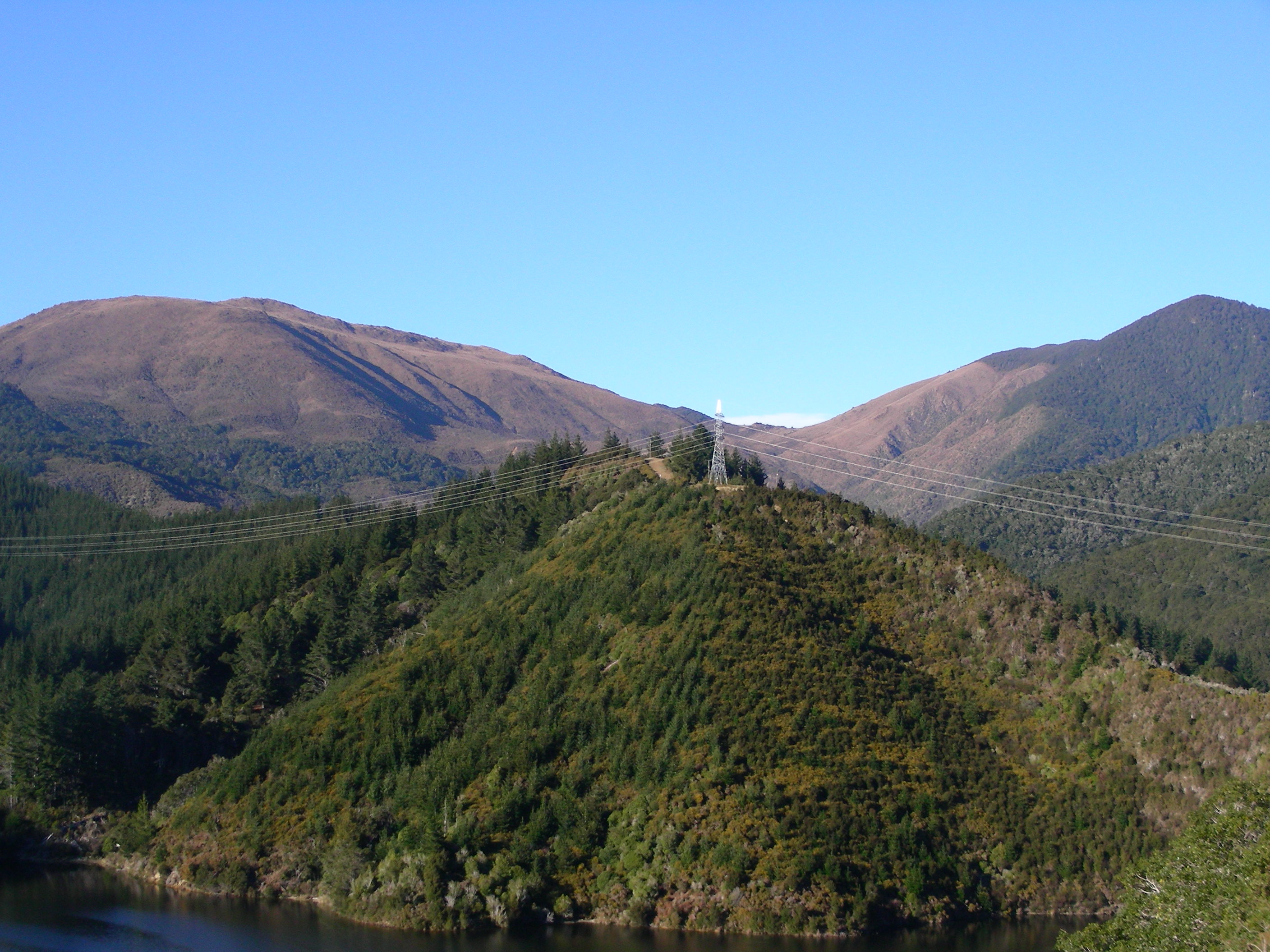
Dun mountain, type locality.

This species is endemic to New Zealand. This species has been collected at its type locality of the Dun Mountain at a height of approximately 600 m above sea-level, at Tākaka and at Wairoa Gorge, all in the Nelson and Tasman areas.

== Biology and behaviour ==
The adults of this species are on the wing in January.

== Habitat ==
This species frequents forest habitat.

== Conservation status ==
In 2015 and again in 2025 this species was classified by the New Zealand Department of Conservation as "data deficient" under the New Zealand Threat Classification System.
