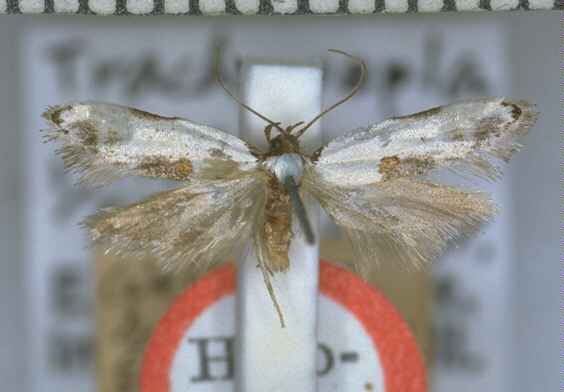
- Male holotype

Scientific classification
- Kingdom: Animalia
- Phylum: Arthropoda
- Class: Insecta
- Order: Lepidoptera
- Family: Oecophoridae
- Genus: Trachypepla
- Species: T. hieropis

Binomial name
- Trachypepla hieropis Meyrick, 1892

= Trachypepla hieropis =

Species of moth endemic to New Zealand

Trachypepla hieropis is a moth of the family Oecophoridae first described by Edward Meyrick in 1892. It is endemic to New Zealand and has been collected in both the North and South Islands. This species inhabits native forest and the larvae feed on leaf litter. Adults are on the wing in December and are attracted to light.

== Taxonomy ==
This species was first described in 1892 by Edward Meyrick using a male specimen collected by George Hudson in Wellington. The male holotype is held at the Natural History Museum, London.

== Description ==
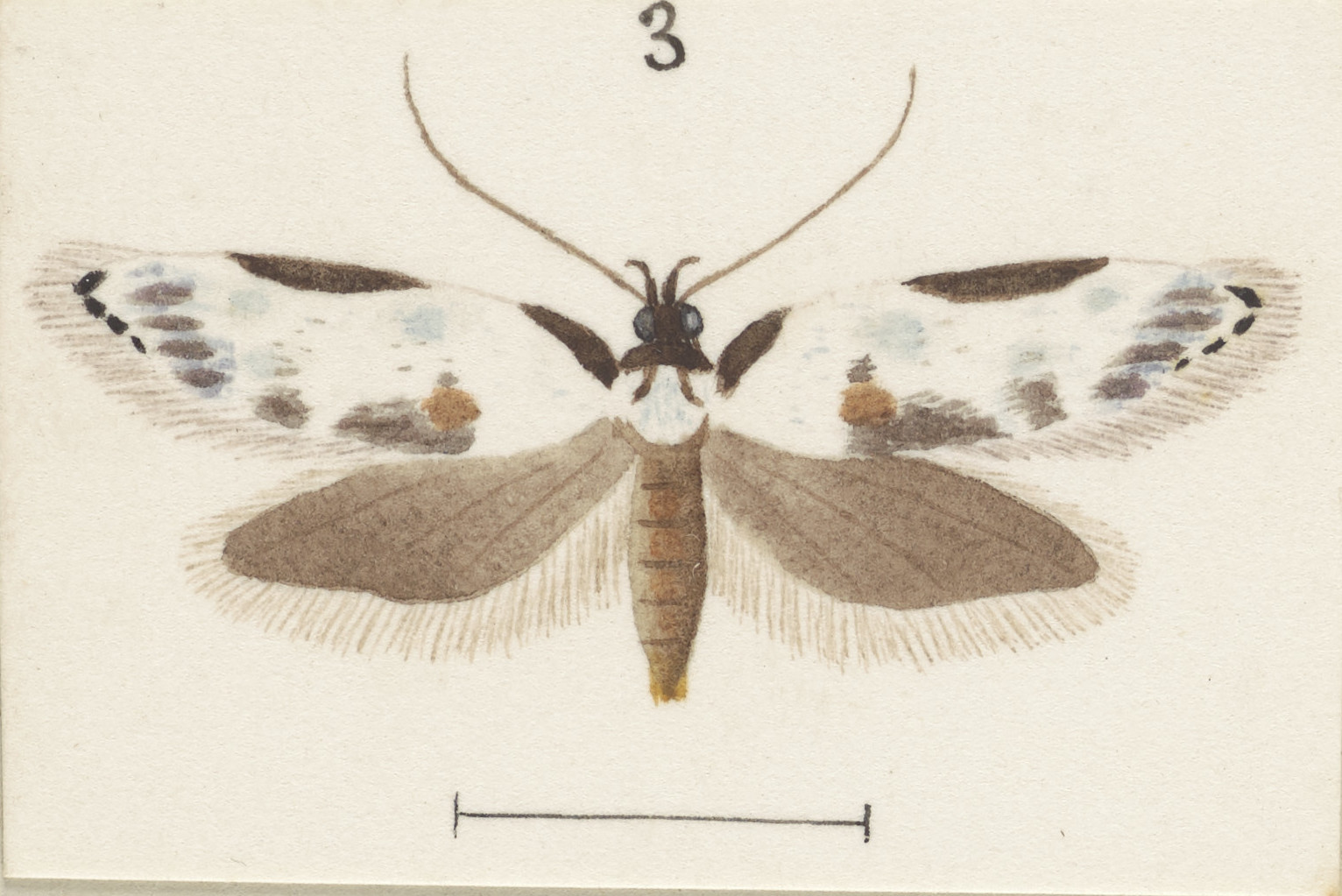
Illustration of female

Meyrick described this species as follows:

♂. 13mm. Head, palpi, and antennae dark fuscous. Thorax snow-white, anterior margin dark fuscous. Abdomen grey. Legs dark fuscous, posterior pair grey-whitish. Fore-wings elongate, apex round - pointed, hindmargin extremely obliquely rounded; snow-white; base of costa blackish; a short dark-grey streak, narrowed anteriorly, along costa from 2/5 to 2/3; a dark-grey trapezoidal dorsal blotch, extending on inner margin from before middle to 4/5, not reaching half across wing, upper anterior angle occupied by a brownish-tinged tuft; some grey scales indicating a streak from anal angle, reaching half across wing; a cloudy dark-grey elongate-triangular spot along hindmargin; an irregular black mark running round apex : cilia grey, mixed with white towards base. Hindwings rather dark grey; cilia grey.

== Distribution ==
This species is endemic to New Zealand. Specimens have been collected at Wellington, Whangarei, Gisborne, Mount Taranaki and at the Nelson Lakes National Park .

== Habitat and host species ==
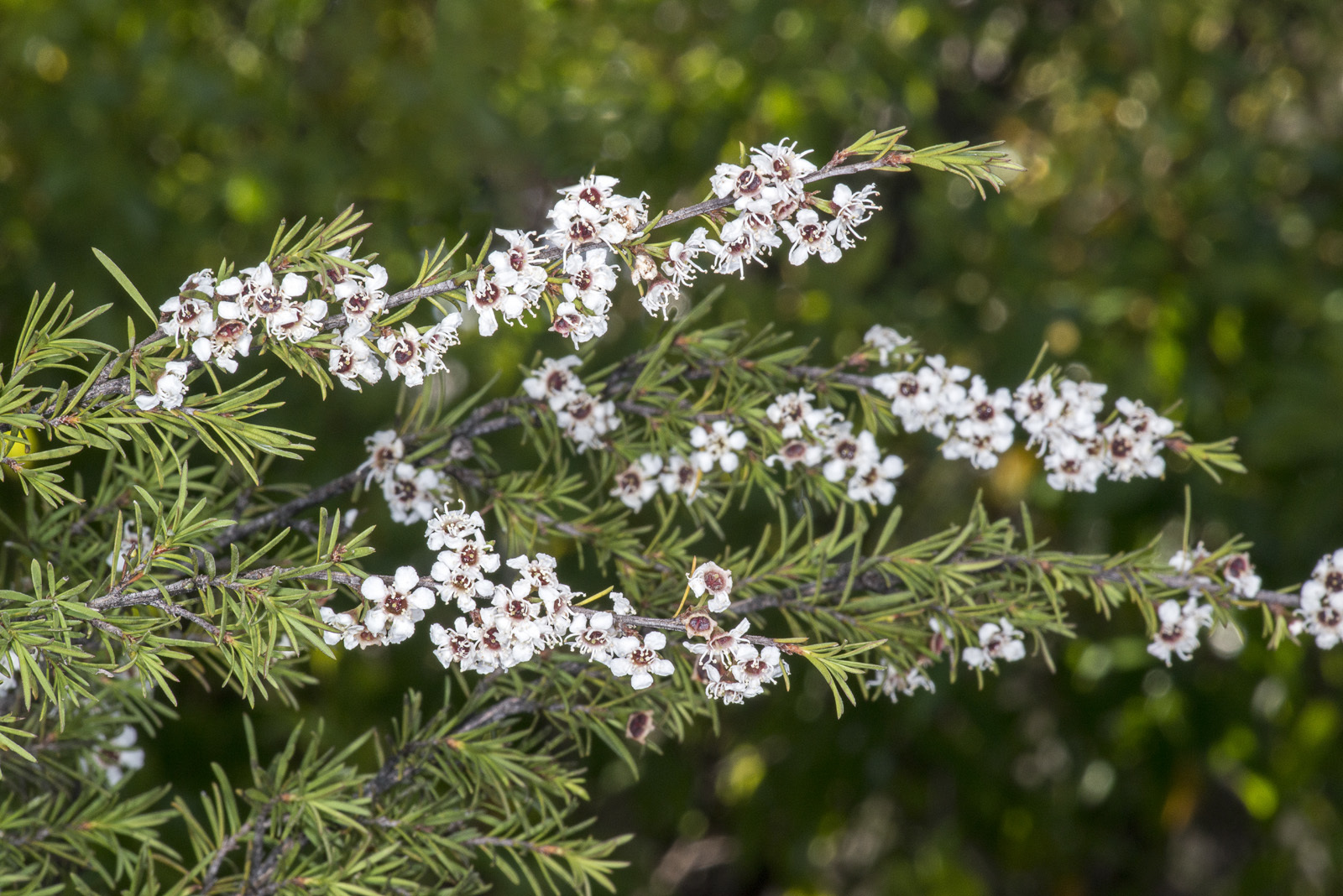
Kānuka

T. hieropis inhabits native forest. The larvae of this species feeds on the leaf litter of kānuka.

== Behaviour ==
Adult species are on the wing in December. This species is attracted to light.
