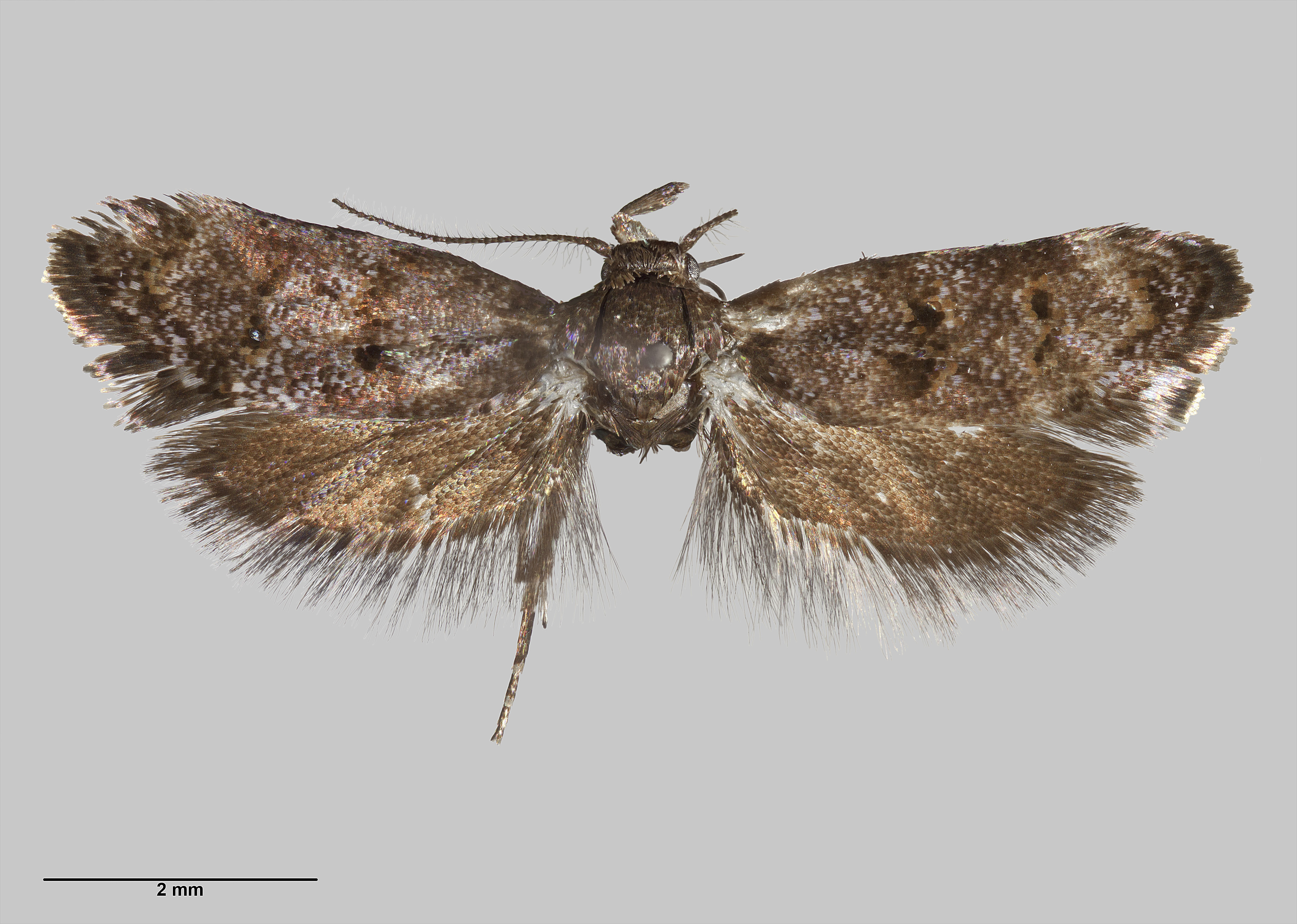
- Male holotype

Scientific classification
- Kingdom: Animalia
- Phylum: Arthropoda
- Class: Insecta
- Order: Lepidoptera
- Family: Oecophoridae
- Genus: Trachypepla
- Species: T. minuta

Binomial name
- Trachypepla minuta Philpott, 1931

= Trachypepla minuta =

Species of moth endemic to New Zealand

Trachypepla minuta is a moth of the family Oecophoridae first described by Alfred Philpott in 1931. It is endemic to New Zealand and has been collected in Auckland. Adults of this species are on the wing in December. It is distinguishable from similar species as it is smaller in size and darker in appearance than other species in the genus Trachypepla.

== Taxonomy ==
This species was first described in 1931 by Alfred Philpott using a male specimen collected at the Auckland Domain. George Hudson discussed and illustrated this specimen in his 1939 book "A supplement to the butterflies and moths of New Zealand. The male holotype is held at the Auckland War Memorial Museum.

== Description ==
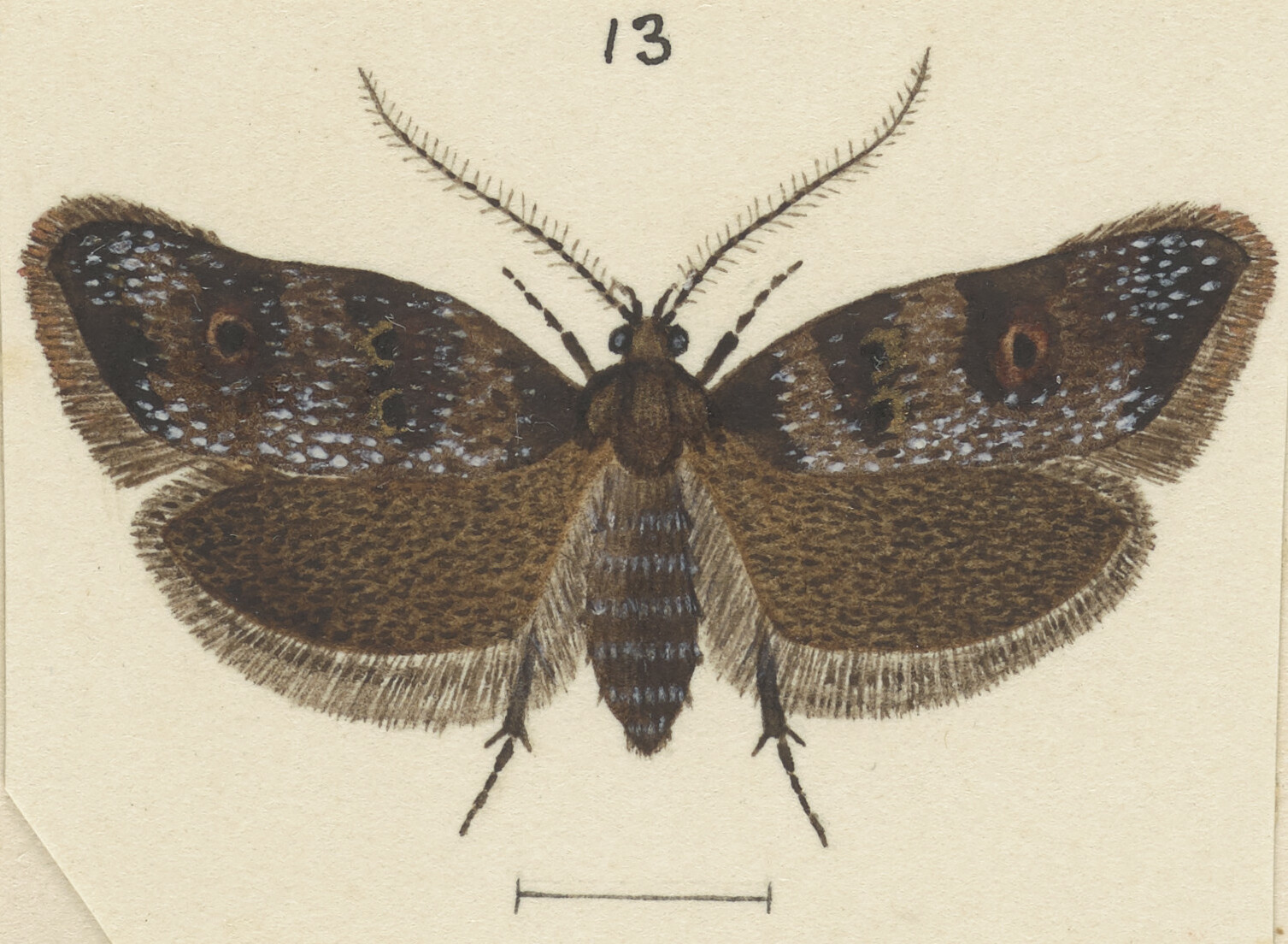
Male illustrated by Hudson.

Philpott described this species as follows:

♂. 9 mm. Head, palpi, thorax and abdomen dark purplish fuscous. Antennae purplish fuscous spotted with whitish ochreous, ciliations in ♂ 5. Legs purplish fuscous, tarsi obscurely annulated with pale brownish. Forewings with costa subsinuate, apex rounded, termen slightly rounded, oblique; dark fuscous sprinkled with whitish blue; scale-tufts and markings black, margined with bright ochreous; a curved transverse scale-tuft at ⅓ not quite reaching costa or dorsum; a similar but shorter tuft at ⅔; a subterminal line parallel to apex and termen, posteriorly margined with whitish blue; termen margined with black: fringes purplish fuscous. Hindwings bronzy fuscous: fringes dark fuscous with thick darker basal line.

This species is distinguishable from other species in the genus as it is smaller in size as well as darker in appearance.

== Distribution ==
T. minuta is endemic to New Zealand.

== Behaviour ==
The adults of this species is on the wing in December.
