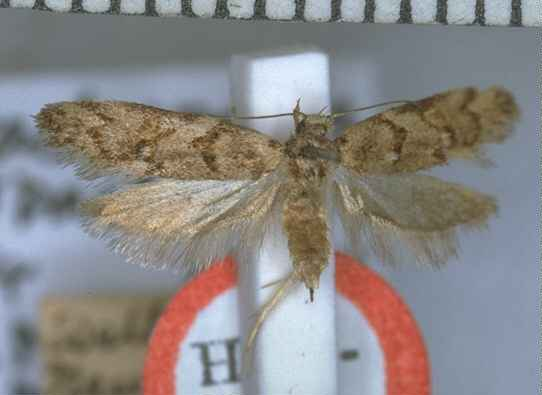
- Female holotype

Scientific classification
- Kingdom: Animalia
- Phylum: Arthropoda
- Class: Insecta
- Order: Lepidoptera
- Family: Oecophoridae
- Genus: Trachypepla
- Species: T. spartodeta

Binomial name
- Trachypepla spartodeta Meyrick, 1883

= Trachypepla spartodeta =

Species of moth endemic to New Zealand

Trachypepla spartodeta is a moth of the family Oecophoridae first described by Edward Meyrick in 1883. It is endemic to New Zealand and has been collected in both the North and South Islands. This species inhabits native forest and adults are on the wing from November to January.

== Taxonomy ==
This species was first described by Edward Meyrick in 1883 using a specimen collected in Wellington in January. A fuller description of this species was given by Meyrick in 1884. George Hudson discussed and illustrated this species in his 1928 book The butterflies and moths of New Zealand. The female holotype, collected in the Wellington Botanic Garden, is held at the Natural History Museum, London.

== Description ==
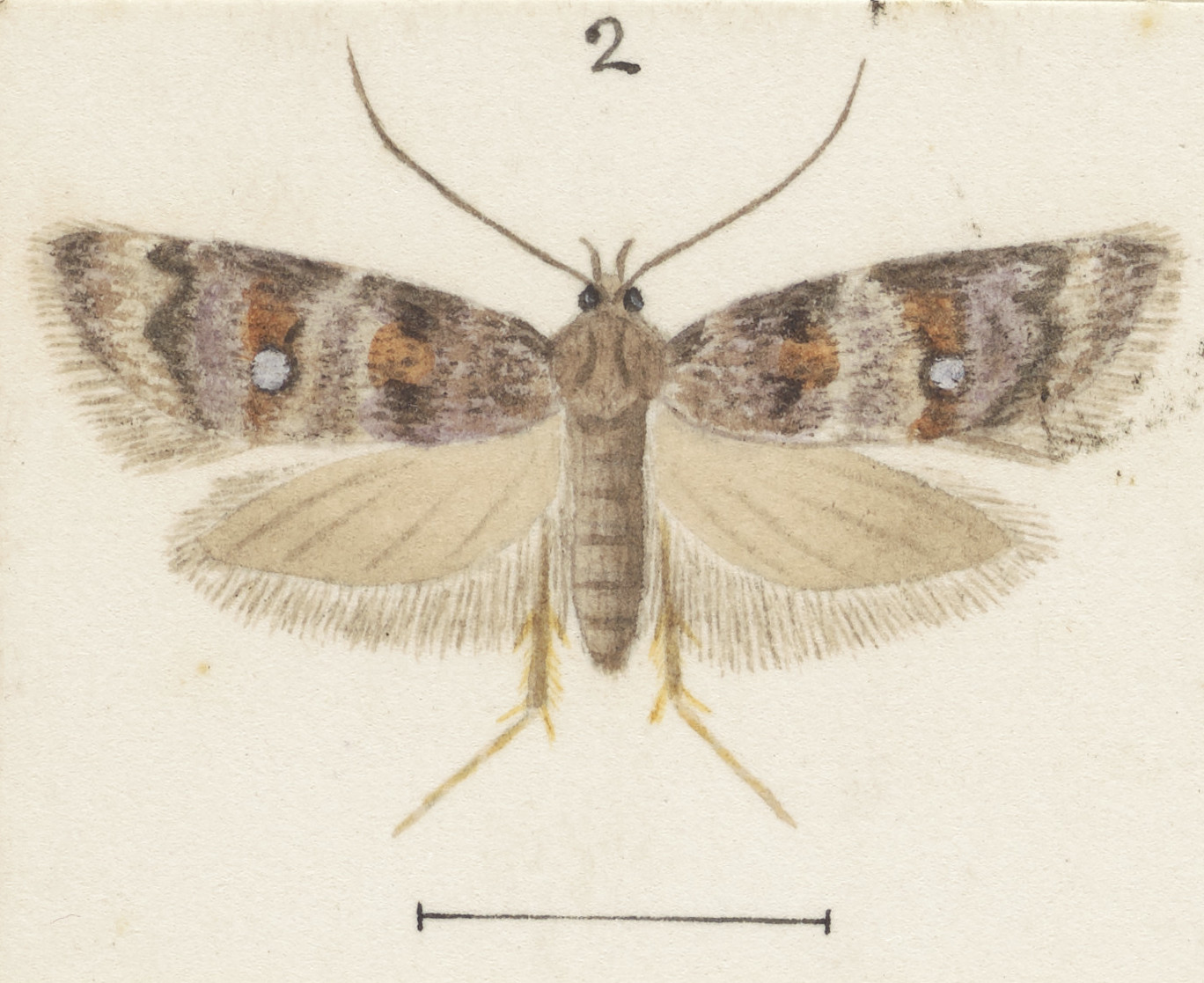
Illustration of female by Hudson.

Meyrick described this species as follows:

Female. — 15 mm. Head and palpi pale greyish-ochreous, terminal joint of palpi with two obscure dark fuscous rings, second joint obscurely banded with dark fuscous. Antennae fuscous. Thorax pale greyish-ochreous, mixed with dark fuscous. Abdomen grey. Anterior and middle legs dark fuscous, with pale greyish-ochreous rings at apex of joints; posterior legs whitish-ochreous, slightly infuscated. Forewings elongate, rather narrow, costa moderately arched, apex nearly pointed, hindmargin hardly rounded, very oblique; greyish-ochreous, somewhat mixed with dark fuscous; markings cloudy dark fuscous; a small spot at base of costa, and another on inner margin near base; a transverse line from 1/4 of costa to 1/3 of inner margin, forming a right angle outwards in disc, where it is mixed with ferruginous, and preceded near inner margin by a tuft of raised scales; a narrow elongate spot along central third of costa, connected with a raised ferruginous spot in middle of disc, beneath which is a raised tuft and some irregular dark fuscous spots; a transverse line proceeding from costa at 4/5 obliquely inwards, a little beneath costa sharply bent outwards, and thence curved to anal angle; three or four small cloudy marginal spots round apex: cilia pale greyish-ochreous, mixed with dark fuscous. Hindwings pale grey, apex and hindmargin darker; cilia grey- whitish, with two faint grey lines.

This species is variable in the intensity and depth of its general colouration as well as in the markings on its forewings.

== Distribution ==
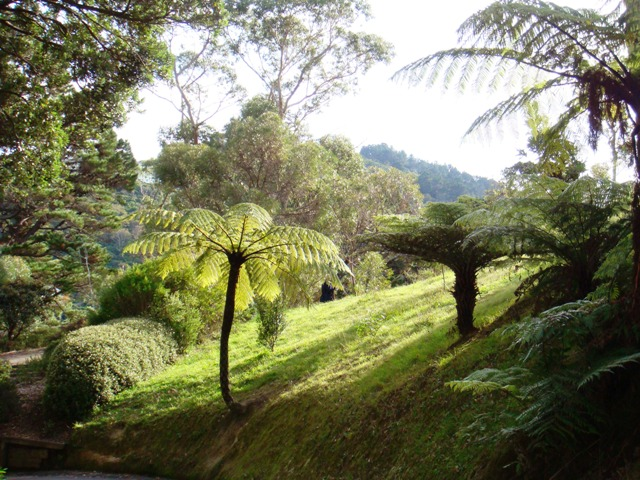
The Wellington Botanic Garden, type locality of T. spartodeta.

This species is endemic to New Zealand and has been collected in Wellington as well as in Taupo, Dunedin and Southland. Hudson was of the opinion that this species was rather rare.

== Habitat ==
This species inhabits native forest.

== Behaviour ==
The adults of this species are on wing from November until January.
