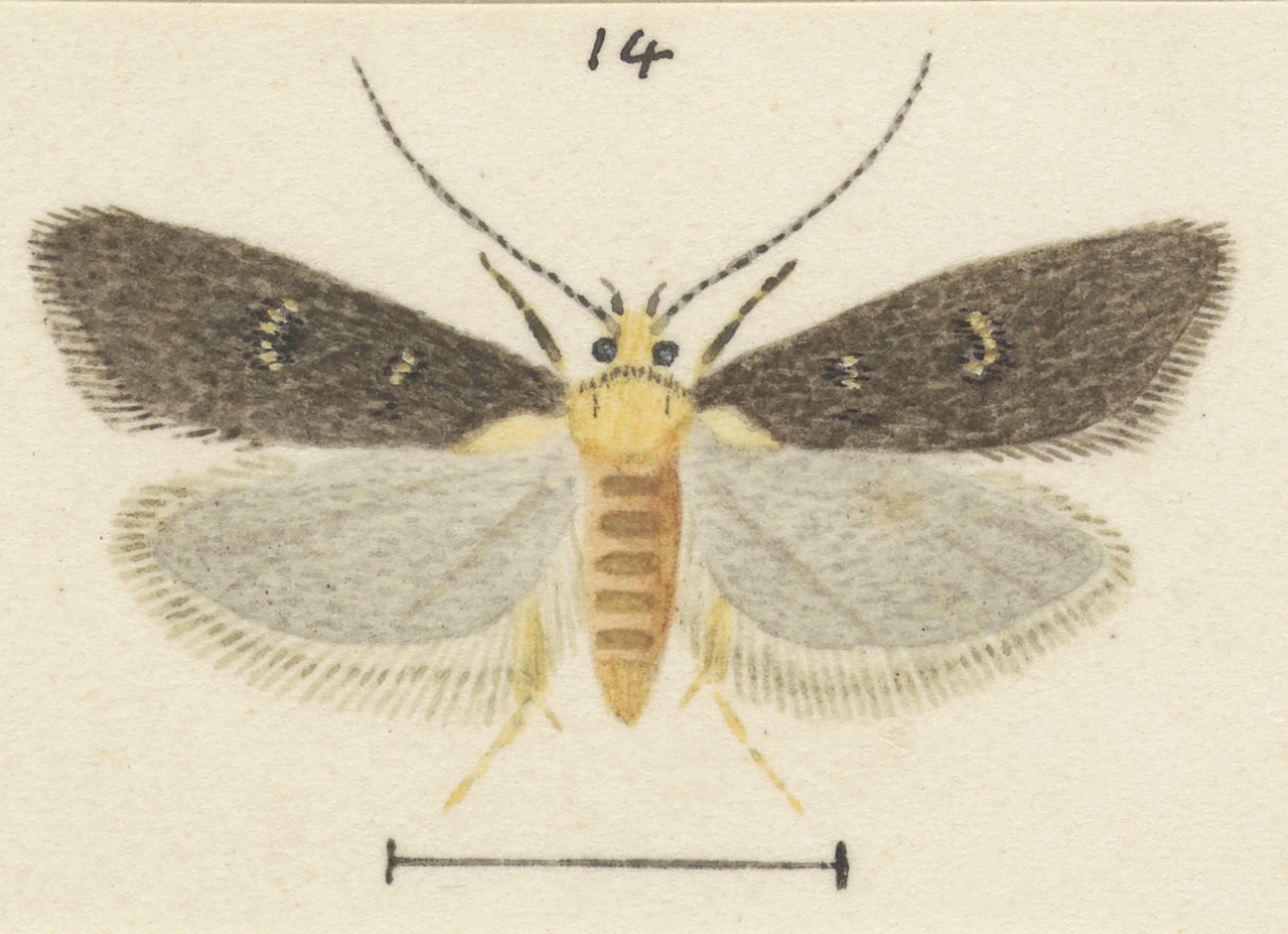
- Illustration of male

Conservation status
- Naturally Uncommon (NZ TCS)

Scientific classification
- Kingdom: Animalia
- Phylum: Arthropoda
- Class: Insecta
- Order: Lepidoptera
- Family: Oecophoridae
- Genus: Trachypepla
- Species: T. cyphonias

Binomial name
- Trachypepla cyphonias Meyrick, 1927

= Trachypepla cyphonias =

Species of moth

Trachypepla cyphonias is a species of moth in the family Oecophoridae. It is endemic to New Zealand and has been collected in Wellington and Taranaki. Larvae of this species have been reared from kānuka leaf litter. Adults are on the wing in December. This species is classified as "At Risk, Naturally Uncommon" by the Department of Conservation.

== Taxonomy ==
This species was described by Edward Meyrick in 1927 using a male specimen collected by George Hudson in Wellington on the hills on the eastern side of Wellington Harbour in December. Hudson discussed and illustrated the species in 1939. The holotype specimen is held at the Natural History Museum, London.

== Description ==
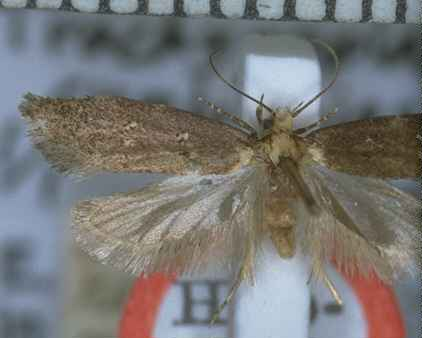
Holotype of Trachypepla cyphonias.

Meyrick described the species as follows:

♂ 15 mm. Head ochreous-whitish. Palpi ochreous-whitish, second joint dark fuscous except apex, terminal joint with two dark fuscous rings. Antennal ciliations 1. Thorax ochreous-whitish, shoulders fuscous. Forewings elongate, termen very obliquely rounded; purplish-fuscous, darker-sprinkled, costa suffused darker; an ochreous-whitish spot on base of dorsum; first discal stigma formed of black and white raised scales, plical small, of black raised scales, beneath first discal, second discal included in a curved transverse linear white mark edged with raised black scales; a minute whitish dot on costa before middle; a suffused whitish triangular dot on costa beyond 2/3, whence a very indistinct irregular curved series of undefined dots of blackish irroration runs to tornus: cilia greyish, with series of ochreous-whitish points. Hindwings grey, paler near base; cilia ochreous-whitish, with faint pale greyish lines.

== Distribution ==
This species is endemic to New Zealand. Along with its type locality, this specimen has also been collected at Egmont.

== Biology and life history ==
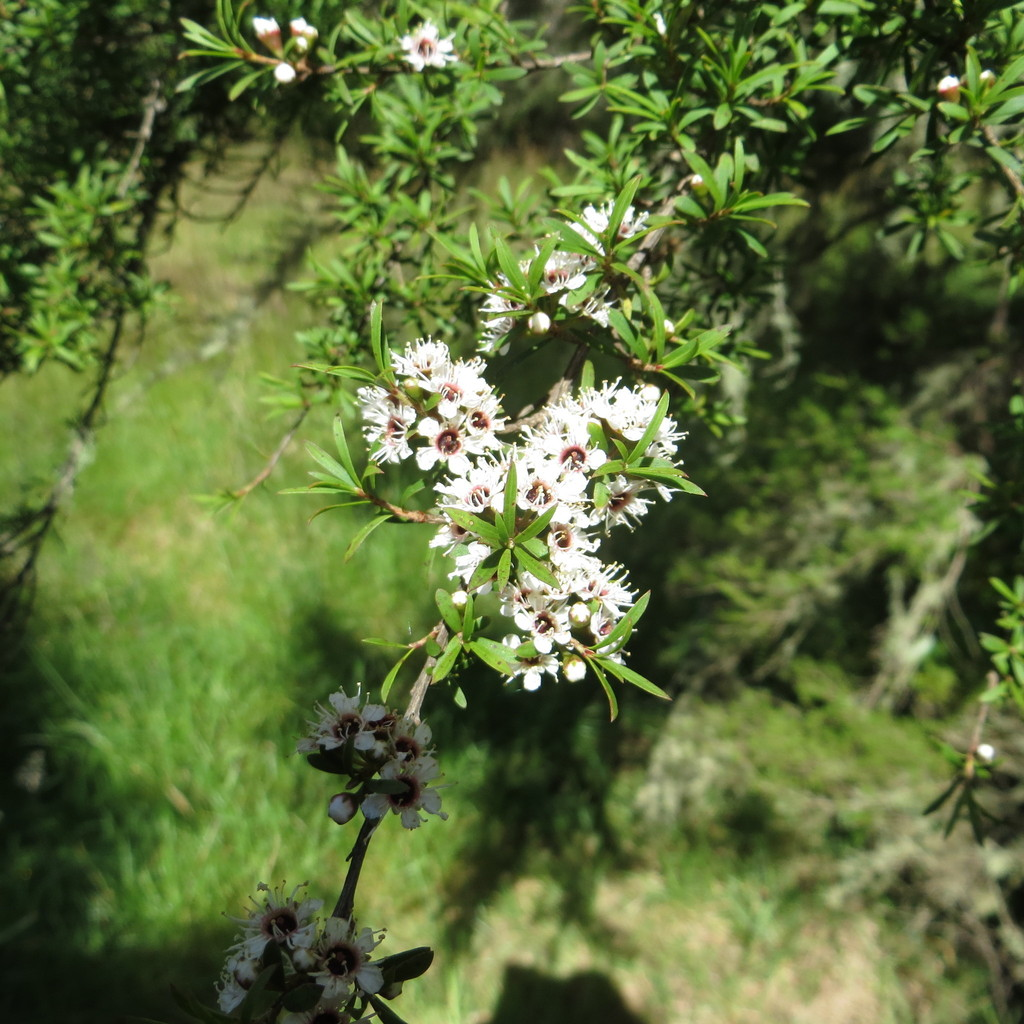
Kānuka

This species is on the wing in December. Larvae have been reared from trapped litter in kānuka.

== Host species and habitat ==
The preferred habitat of this species is open scrub.

== Conservation status ==
This species has been classified as having the "At Risk, Naturally Uncommon" conservation status under the New Zealand Threat Classification System. Brian H. Patrick suggested that this species is in need of further research.
