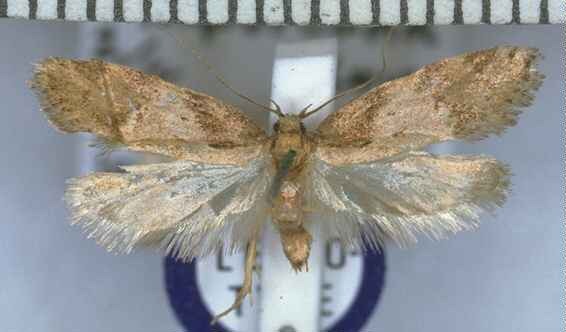
- Male lectotype

Scientific classification
- Kingdom: Animalia
- Phylum: Arthropoda
- Class: Insecta
- Order: Lepidoptera
- Family: Oecophoridae
- Genus: Trachypepla
- Species: T. importuna

Binomial name
- Trachypepla importuna Meyrick, 1914

= Trachypepla importuna =

Species of moth endemic to New Zealand

Trachypepla importuna is a species of moth in the family Oecophoridae that was first described by Edward Meyrick in 1914. It is endemic to New Zealand. Adults have been collected in the North Island in January but the species is regarded as being poorly known.

== Taxonomy ==
This species was first described by Edward Meyrick in 1914 using specimens collected by George Hudson in January at Ohakune and Wellington. Hudson discussed this species in his book The butterflies and moths of New Zealand. The lectotype specimen, collected at Ohakune, is held at Natural History Museum, London.

== Description ==
Meyrick described this species as follows:

♂♀. 16-18 mm. Head and thorax whitish-grey. Palpi ochreous whitish tinged with grey except towards apex of joints. Antennal ciliations of ♂ 1 1/2. Abdomen whitish-ochreous. Forewings elongate, rather narrow towards base, costa gently arched, apex obtuse, termen very obliquely rounded; pale fuscous, somewhat mixed with whitish; a triangular fuscous patch extending over basal 2/5 of costa and reaching to below fold, edged posteriorly by an inwardly oblique series of three suffused subconfluent dark-fuscous spots, two lower tufted; stigmata small, dark fuscous, plical beneath first discal; second discal connected with tornus by a streak of fuscous suffusion, mixed with dark fuscous, preceded on upper part by some raised white scales; spots of fuscous suffusion on costa beyond middle and at 3/4; from second of these an indistinct angulated fuscous line runs to tornus; a series of cloudy dark - fuscous dots round posterior part of costa and termen : cilia pale fuscous. Hindwings whitish-fuscous; cilia fuscous- whitish.

== Distribution ==
This species is endemic to New Zealand. In Wellington it is regarded as being local and uncommon.

== Behaviour ==
Adults of this species are on the wing in January. It is regarded as being poorly known.
