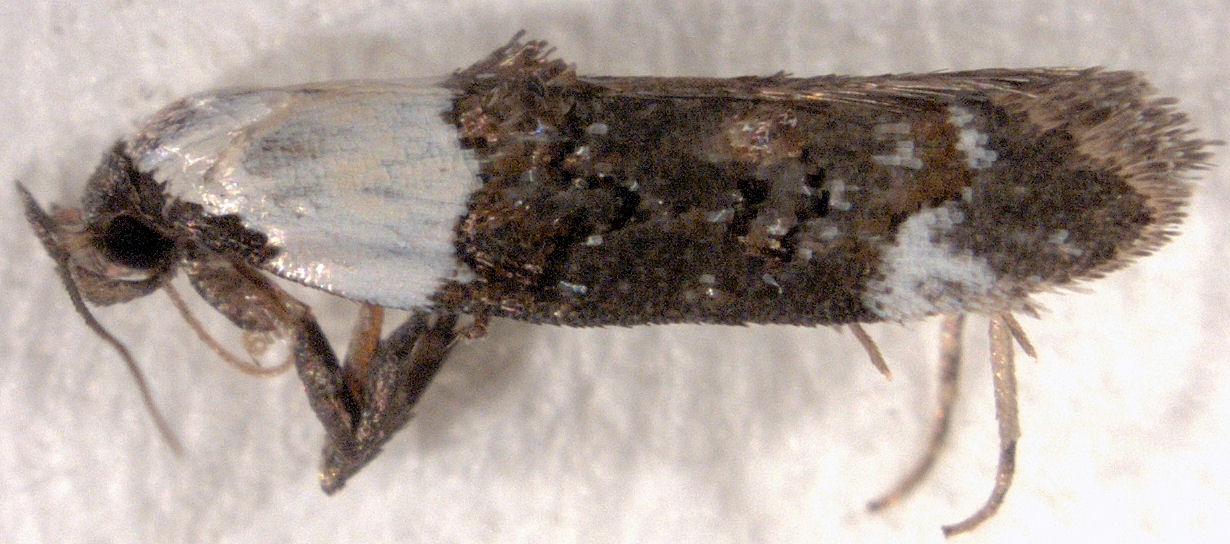

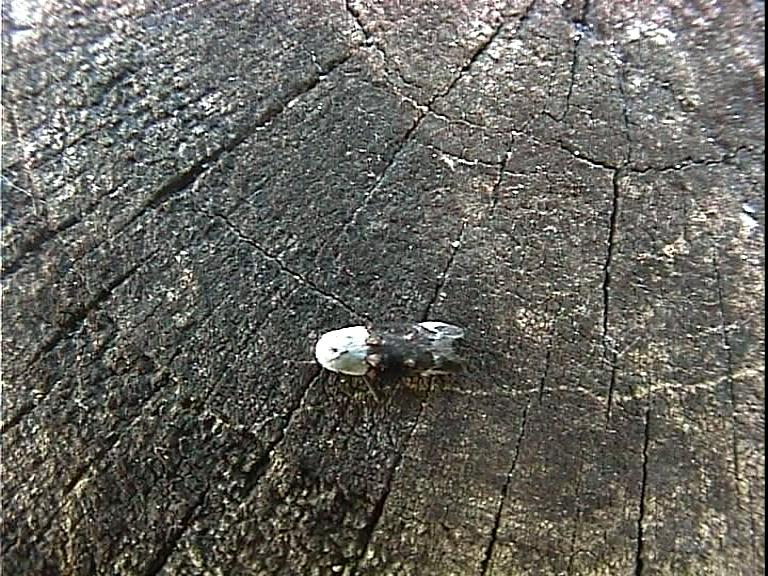

Scientific classification
- Kingdom: Animalia
- Phylum: Arthropoda
- Clade: Pancrustacea
- Class: Insecta
- Order: Lepidoptera
- Family: Oecophoridae
- Genus: Trachypepla
- Species: T. euryleucota

Binomial name
- Trachypepla euryleucota Meyrick, 1883

= Trachypepla euryleucota =

Species of moth endemic to New Zealand

Trachypepla euryleucota is a species of moth in the family Oecophoridae. It is endemic to New Zealand and can be found throughout the country, inhabiting native forest. The larvae are leaf litter feeders and have also been found feeding on and in bird nests. Adults are on the wing from December to March, are nocturnal and are attracted to light. During the daylight hours they can be sometimes be observed resting on walls or fences. It has been hypothesised that the adults resemble an opening manuka flower bud or bird droppings in order to camouflage themselves from predators. The raised tufts on their forewings possibly also assist with camouflaging this moth when they rest on lichen.

== Taxonomy ==
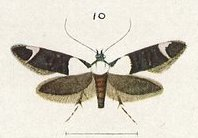
Trachypepla euryleucota by George Hudson

This species was first described by Edward Meyrick in 1883 using specimens collected in Auckland, Wellington and Dunedin. Meyrick gave a more detailed description of the species in a paper published in May 1884. George Hudson discussed and illustrated the species in his 1928 publication The Butterflies and Moths of New Zealand. The type locality of this species is the Botanic Garden and forest in Wellington. The lectotype specimen is held at the Natural History Museum, London.

== Description ==
Meyrick described the species as follows:

Male, female.— 14-17 mm. Head, palpi, and antennae dark fuscous. Thorax white, anterior margin dark fuscous. Abdomen fuscous. Legs dark fuscous, apex of tarsal joints obscurely pale. Forewings elongate, costa arched towards base and apex, rest nearly straight, apex round-pointed, hindmargin very obliquely rounded; dark fuscous; a large white basal patch, slightly ochreous-tinged, outer edge slightly irregular, extending from 1/4 of costa to before middle of inner margin; a small elongate blackish spot on base of costa; two large spots of raised ochreous-brown scales, partially black-margined, in disc before middle, and two smaller ones beyond middle; a small somewhat triangular inwardly oblique white spot on costa at 4/5, emitting from its apex a slender white outwards-angulated line to hindmargin above anal angle, anteriorly blackish-margined : cilia fiasco as-grey, with an obscure darker line. Hindwings fuscous-grey, darker towards apex; cilia fuscous-grey, with an obscure darker line.

== Distribution ==
This species is endemic to New Zealand and is found throughout the country.

== Habitat and hosts ==
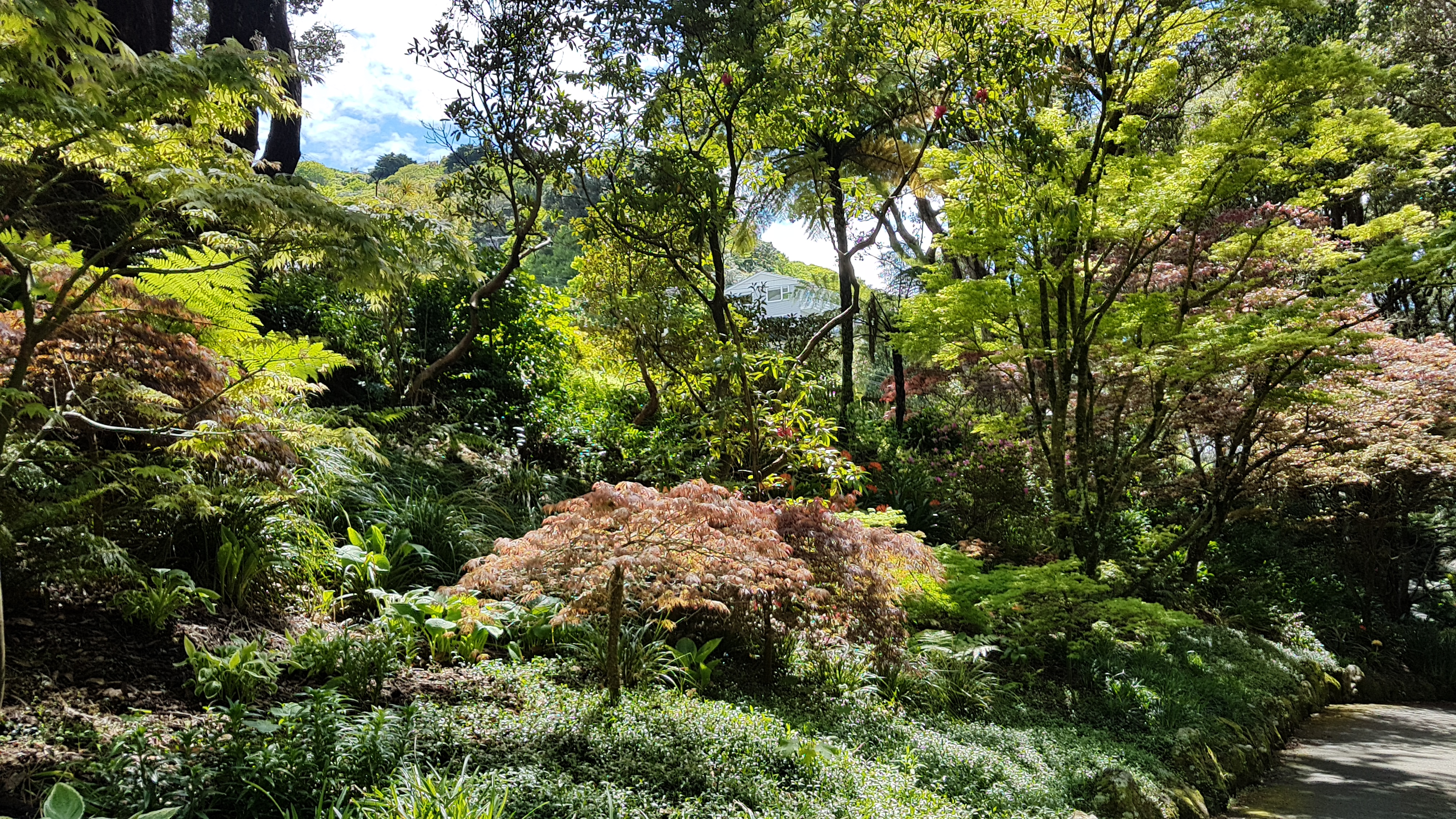
Wellington Botanic Garden, the type locality of the species

T. euryleucota inhabit native forest. Larvae are leaf litter feeders and have also been found feeding on bird nest debris.

== Biology and behaviour ==
Adults are on the wing from December to March. Adults are nocturnal and are attracted to light. During the daytime they have been collected resting on human-made structures such as walls and fences. They have been collected when manuka are in flower – it has been hypothesised that the adults imitate an opening manuka flower bud when at rest, thus camouflaging themselves. It has also been suggested that their colouring is similar to bird droppings and that the raised tufts on their forewings assist in providing camouflage when resting on lichens.
