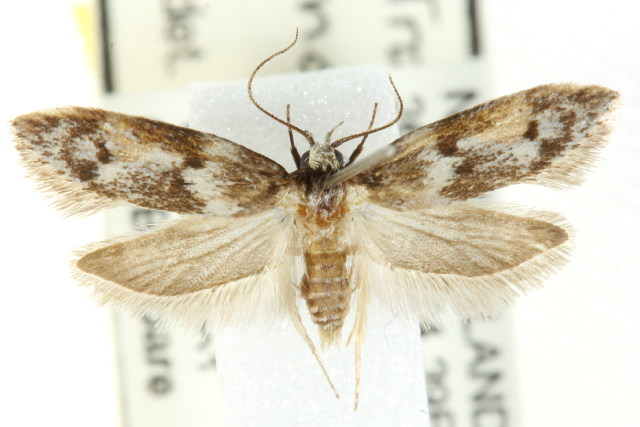

Scientific classification
- Domain: Eukaryota
- Kingdom: Animalia
- Phylum: Arthropoda
- Class: Insecta
- Order: Lepidoptera
- Family: Oecophoridae
- Genus: Trachypepla
- Species: T. indolescens

Binomial name
- Trachypepla indolescens Meyrick, 1927

= Trachypepla indolescens =

Species of moth found in New Zealand and presumed to be native to Australia

Trachypepla importuna is a moth of the family Oecophoridae and was first described by Edward Meyrick in 1927. This moth is thought to have been introduced to New Zealand, but is presumed to be native to Australia. T. importuna has been collected in both the North and South Islands of New Zealand. It inhabits native scrub and adults are on the wing in January and February. The placement of this species in the genus Trachypepla is regarded as unsatisfactory and in need of revision.

== Taxonomy ==
This species was first described by Edward Meyrick in 1927 using a male specimen collected by George Hudson in the suburb of Karori in Wellington. George Hudson discussed and illustrated this species in his book The butterflies and moths of New Zealand. The male holotype is held at the Natural History Museum, London. The classification of this moth within the genus Trachypepla is regarded as unsatisfactory and in need of revision. As such this species is currently also known as Trachypepla (s.l.) indolescens.

== Description ==
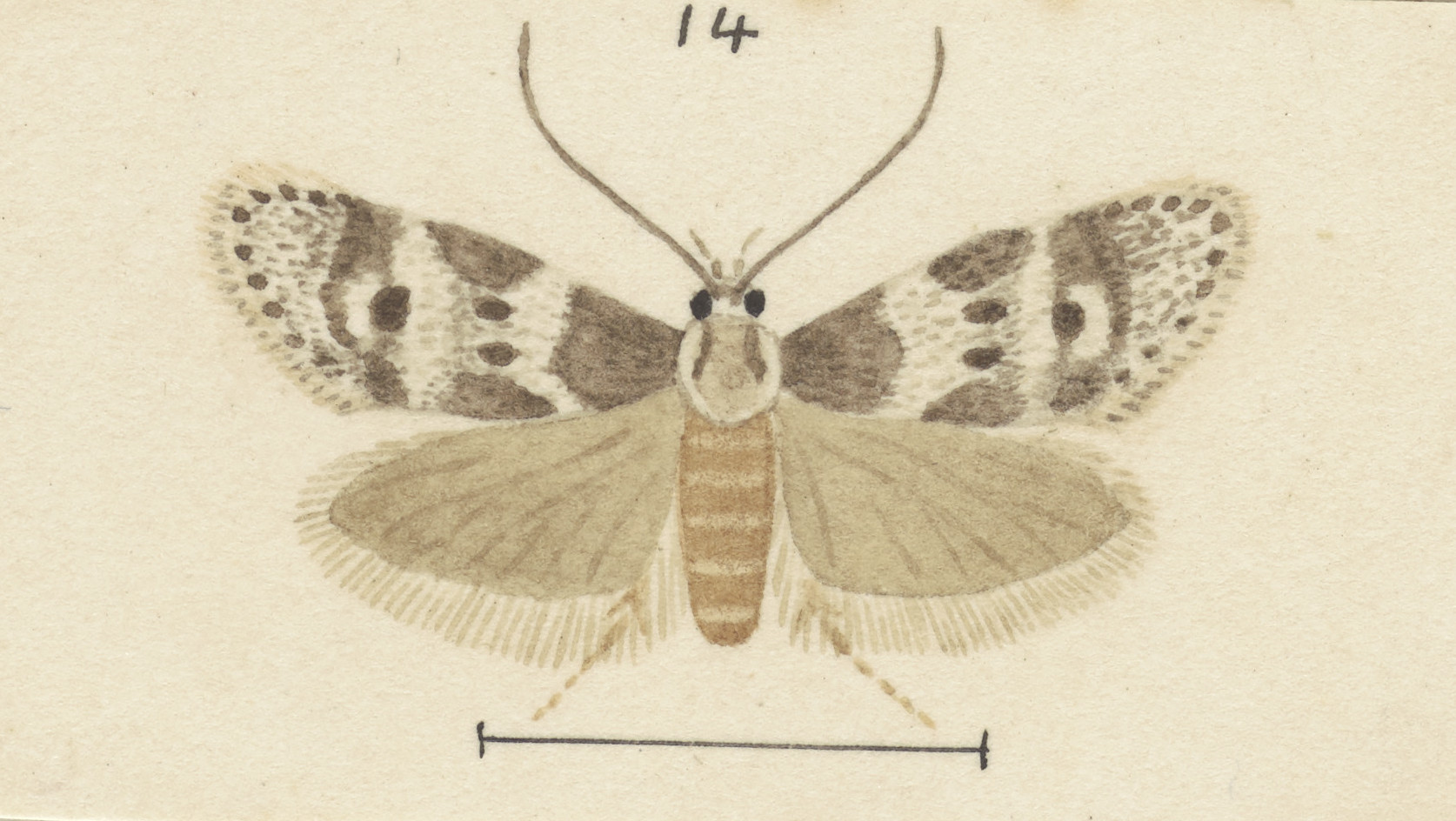
Illustration of male by Hudson.

Meyrick described this species as follows:

♂ 18 mm. Head white. Palpi white, second joint grey except apex, terminal joint grey anteriorly. Antennal ciliations 1. Thorax light grey, sides of metathorax and patagia except shoulders white. Forewings with costa moderately arched, apex obtuse, termen very obliquely rounded; brownish-grey; a rather narrow suffused white angulated fascia about ⅓ stigmata forming small cloudy dark fuscous spots, plical hardly beyond first discal, these adjoining preceding fascia; a broad suffused white fascia preceding second discal, in disc extended anteriorly by broad white suffusion to touch stigmata; beyond this the posterior area suffused white except a line of ground colour from costa at 2/3 to tornus, excurved in disc and indented towards costa; a marginal series of triangular dark fuscous dots round posterior part of costa and termen: cilia fuscous-whitish. Hindwings light grey; cilia ochreous-whitish.

== Distribution ==
T. importuna, although first described from a specimen collected in New Zealand, is regarded as originating from Australia. In New Zealand, this species has been collected in both the North and South Islands.

== Habitat ==
This species inhabits native scrub.

== Behaviour ==
Adults of this species are on the wing in January and February.
