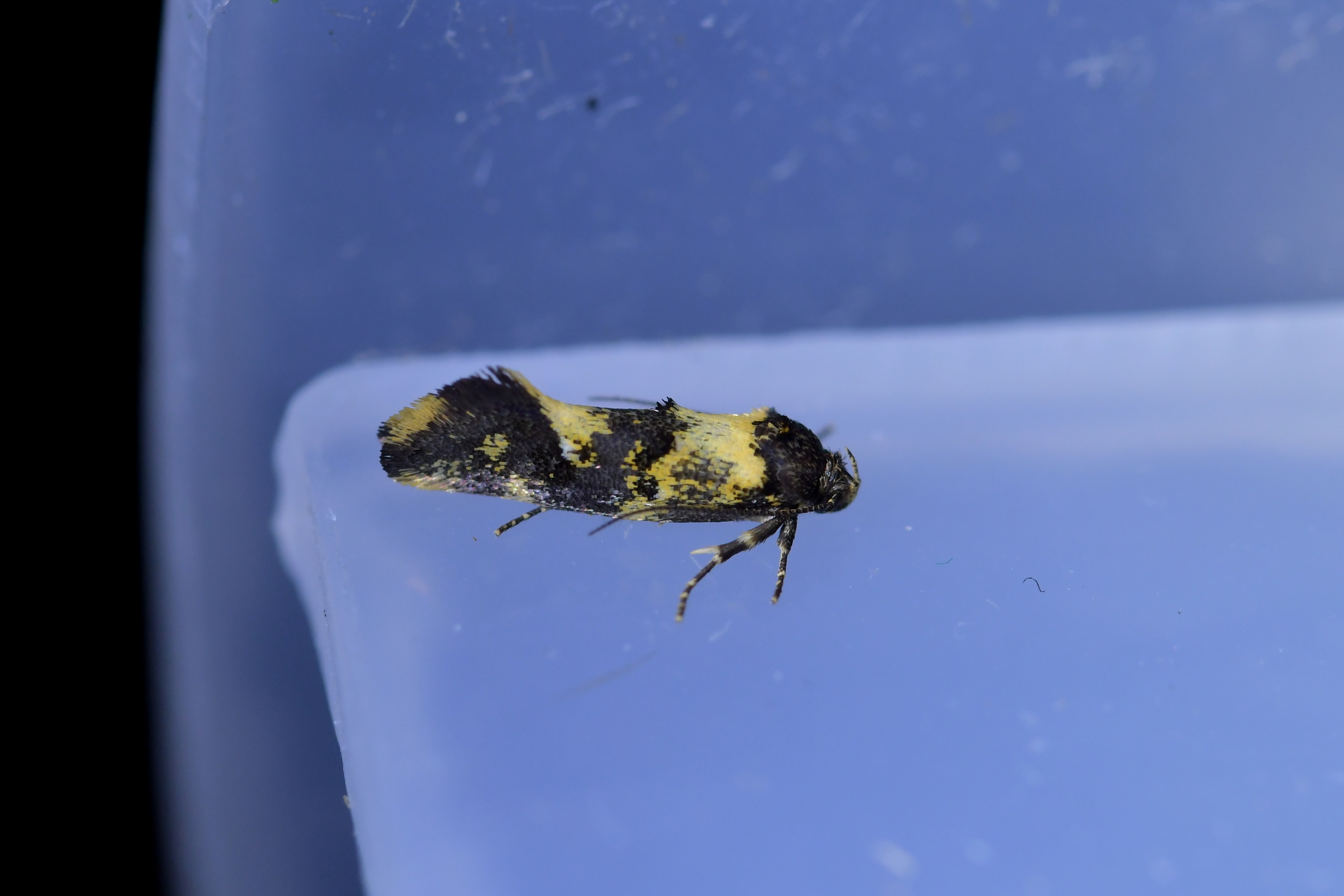

Scientific classification
- Kingdom: Animalia
- Phylum: Arthropoda
- Class: Insecta
- Order: Lepidoptera
- Family: Oecophoridae
- Genus: Trachypepla
- Species: T. lichenodes

Binomial name
- Trachypepla lichenodes Meyrick, 1883

= Trachypepla lichenodes =

Species of moth endemic to New Zealand

Trachypepla lichenodes is a moth of the family Oecophoridae first described by Edward Meyrick in 1883. It is endemic to New Zealand and has been found in both the North and South Islands. It inhabits native forest and adults of this species are on the wing from November to January. The adult moths are similarly coloured to native lichen species however this colouration is variable in the extent and depth on the forewings.

== Taxonomy ==
This species was first described by Edward Meyrick in 1883. A fuller description of this species was given by Meyrick in 1884. The male genitalia of this species was studied and illustrated by Alfred Philpott in 1927. George Hudson discussed and illustrated this species in his 1928 book The butterflies and moths of New Zealand. The female holotype, collected at the Bealey River in North Canterbury is held at the Natural History Museum, London.

== Description ==
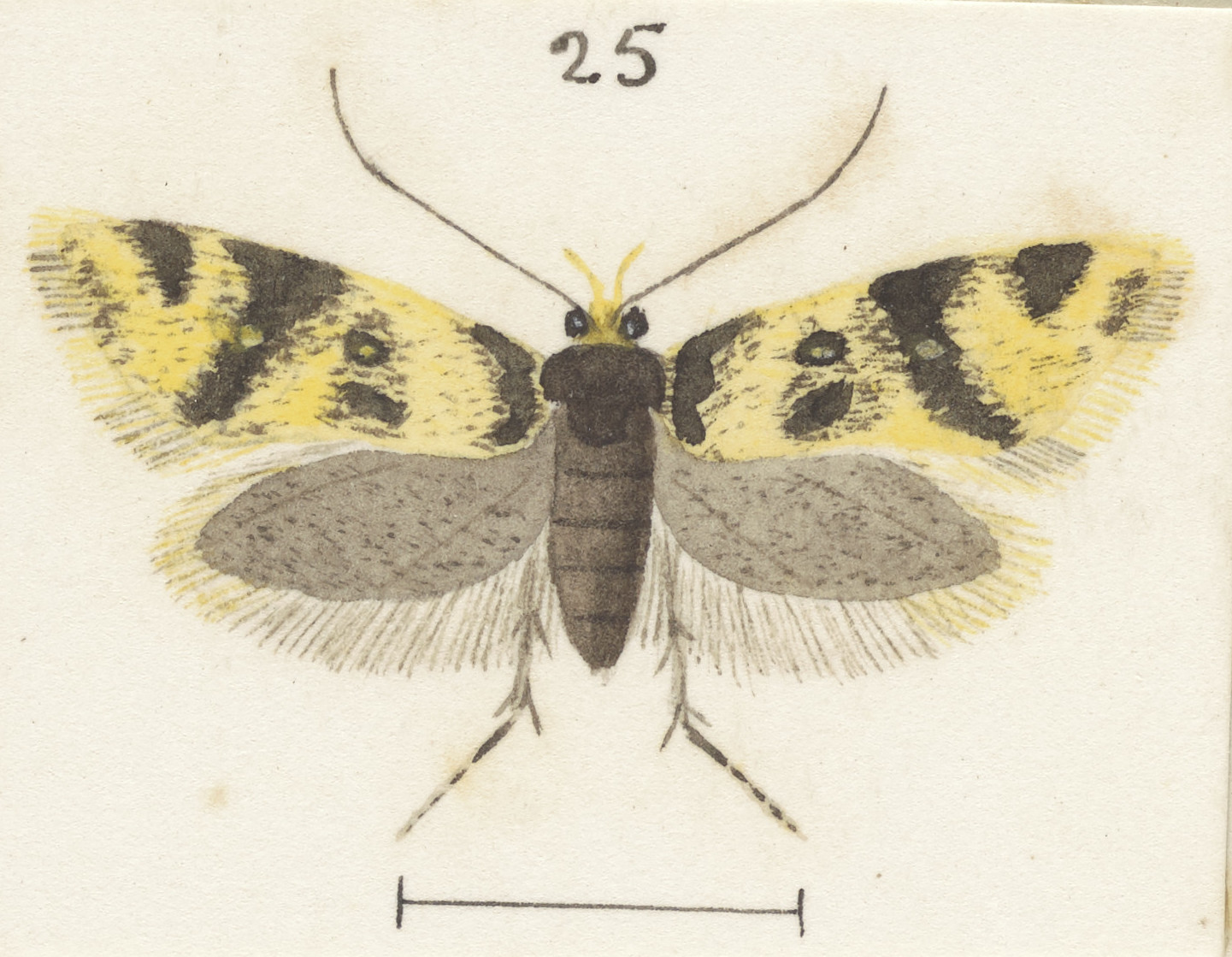
Female T. lichenodes.

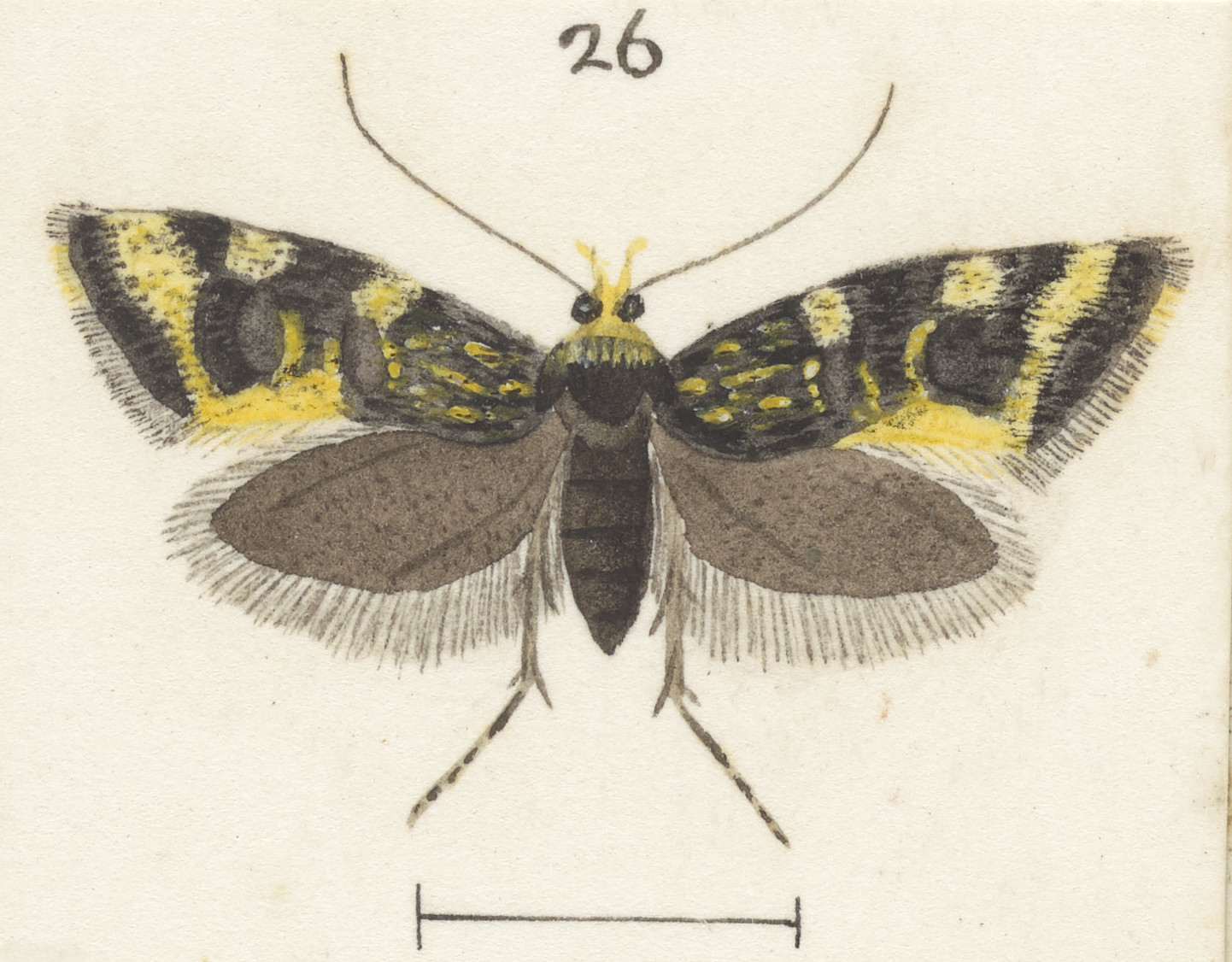
Female T. lichenodes.

Meyrick described this species as follows:

Female. — 14 1/2 mm. Head dull whitish-yellow; palpi broken. Antennae dark fuscous. Thorax dark fuscous, slightly mixed with whitish-ochreous. Abdomen dark fuscous. Legs dark fuscous, middle and posterior tibiae with yellow-whitish central and apical rings, all tarsi with yellow-whitish rings at apex of joints. Forewings moderate, costa moderately arched, apex rounded, hindmargin obliquely rounded; dark purplish-fuscous; base mixed with black, with a tuft of raised scales; a trapezoidal ochreous-white patch on inner margin, extending from near base to 1/3, and reaching half across wing; between this and costa the ground-colour is mixed with whitish-yellow; a cloudy very irregular whitish-yellow fascia from costa at 1/3, to fold, containing two tufts of raised black scales in disc; a roundish black spot in disc beyond middle, partially margined with whitish, on its lower margin containing a tuft of raised white scales, and connected with a semi-oval whitish-yellow spot on inner margin; a small cloudy whitish-yellow spot beneath costa at 3/4, barely touching costa and hindmarginal suffusion; a suffused whitish-yellow hindmarginal patch extending from costa to anal angle, attenuated to a point beneath, mixed with dark fuscous towards hindmargin beneath apex : cilia whitish-yellow, with an ill-defined dark purplish-fuscous apical spot, a larger one at anal angle, and a cloudy basal line. Hindwings dark fuscous; cilia fuscous, with a cloudy darker line.

The yellow markings found on the forewings of adults of this species are variable in both their extent and depth of colour. The yellow and black colouration of this moth mimics lichens and as a result ensures the moth is well camouflaged when resting on these lichens.

== Distribution ==
This species is endemic to New Zealand. It has been found in both the North and South Islands, including in Wellington, Nelson, Lake Rotoiti, Puhi Puhi, Castle Hill, North Canterbury, Mount Cook, Waiho Gorge, Longwood Range, in the Te Anau District and on the Bealey and Ōtira rivers. This species is regarded as being "not generally common".

== Habitat ==
This species inhabits native forests.

== Behaviour ==
The adults of this species are on the wing from November to January.
