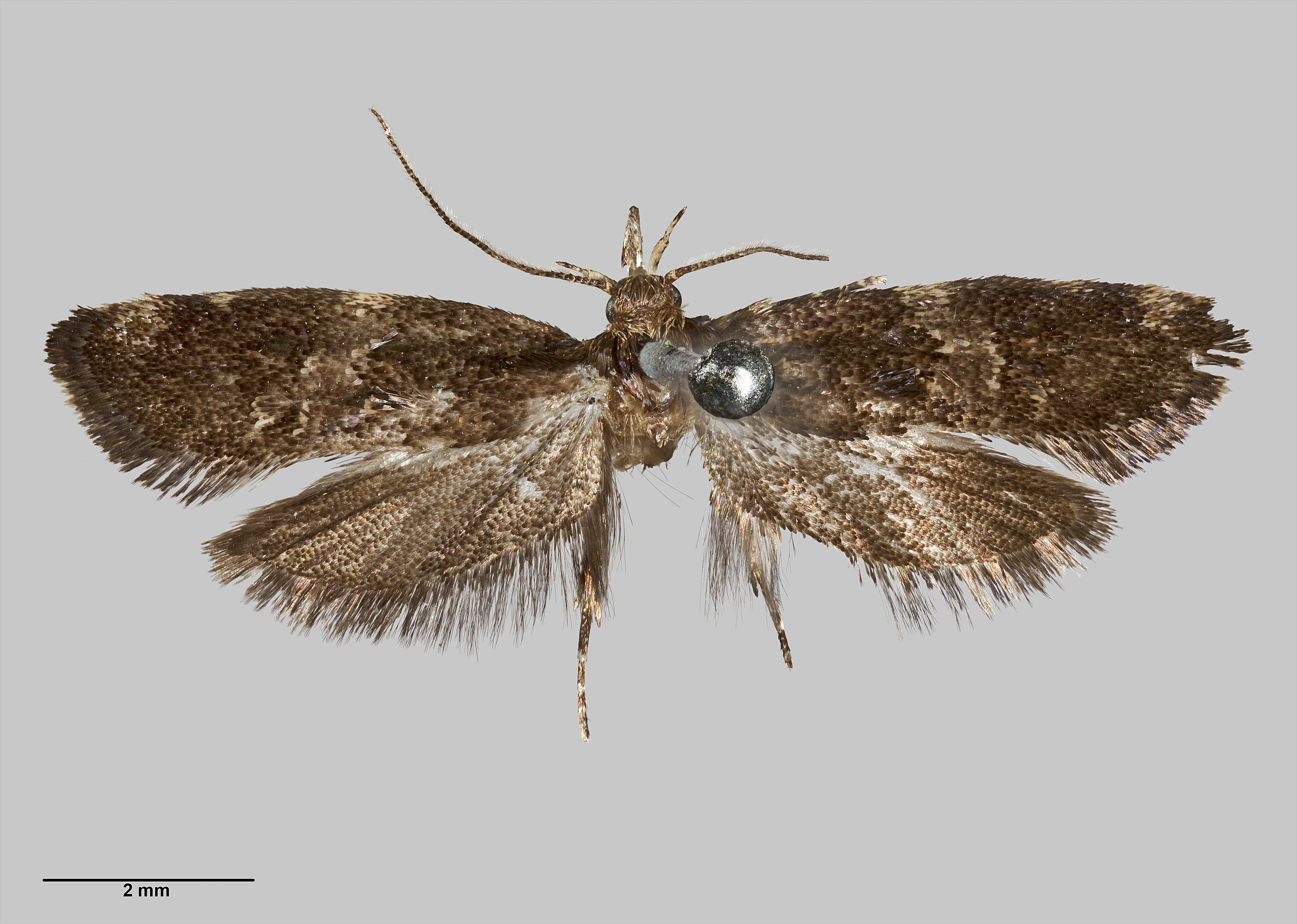
- Male holotype

Scientific classification
- Kingdom: Animalia
- Phylum: Arthropoda
- Clade: Pancrustacea
- Class: Insecta
- Order: Lepidoptera
- Family: Oecophoridae
- Genus: Trachypepla
- Species: T. nimbosa

Binomial name
- Trachypepla nimbosa Philpott, 1930

= Trachypepla nimbosa =

Species of moth

Trachypepla nimbosa is a species of moth in the family Oecophoridae. It is endemic to New Zealand. This species has been collected in Auckland as well as one specimen in the West Coast. Adults are on the wing in January however the West Coast specimen was collected in November. In 2025 this species was classified as "data deficient" under the New Zealand Threat Classification System.

== Taxonomy ==
This species was described by Alfred Philpott in 1930 using a male specimen collected by Charles E. Clarke at Kauri Gully, Birkenhead on 13 January 1919. George Hudson discussed and illustrated this species in his 1939 book A supplement to the butterflies and moths of New Zealand. The holotype specimen is held at the Auckland War Memorial Museum.

== Description ==
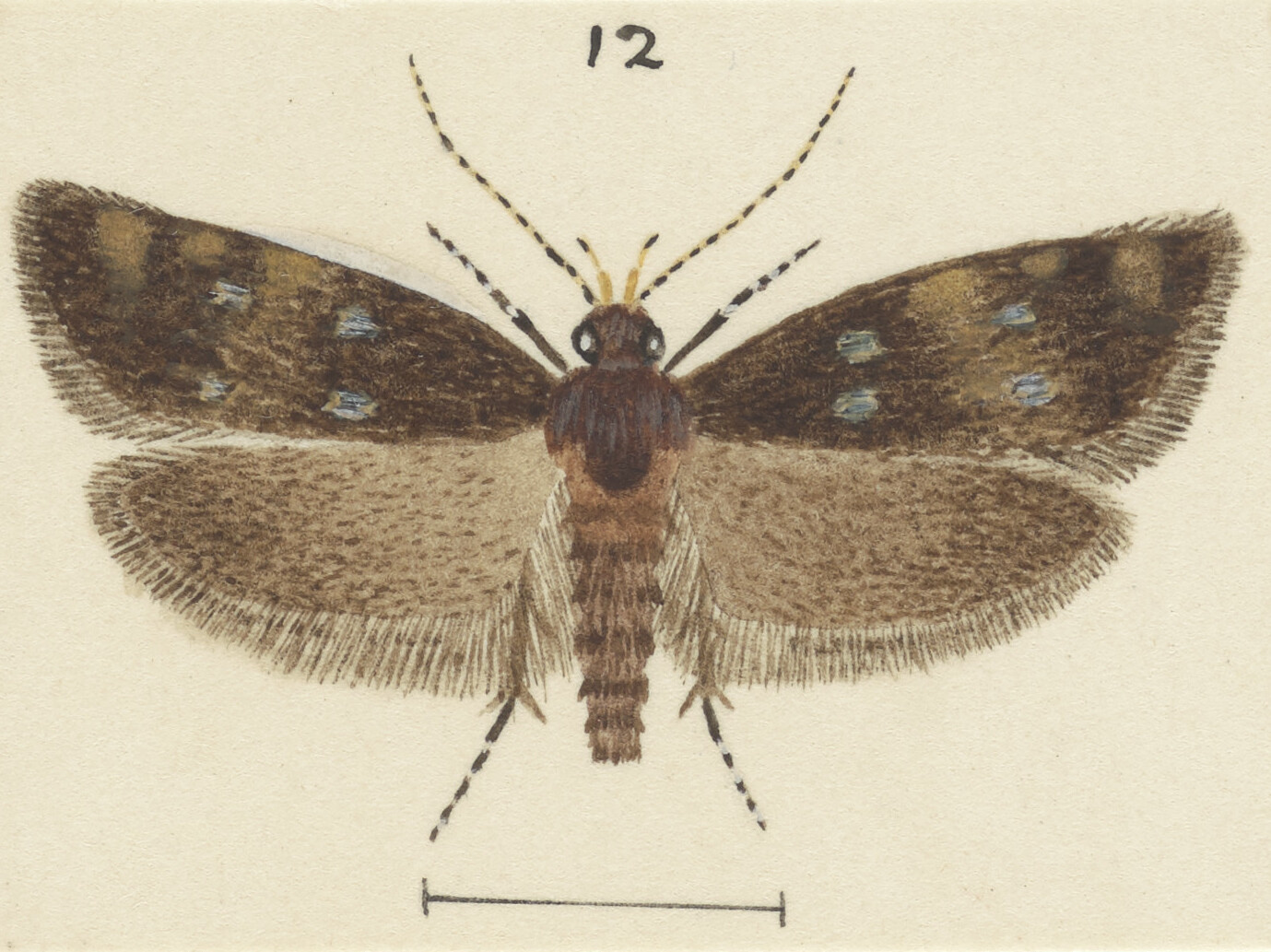
Illustration of male by Hudson.

Philpott described this species as follows:

♂︎, 12 mm. Head and thorax purplish fuscous; face mixed with ochreous. Palpi bright ochreous mixed with blackish, apex of terminal segment black. Antennae fuscous annulated with ochreous, ciliations in ♂︎2. Abdomen light purplish fuscous. Legs greyish fuscous mixed with ochreous, tarsi annulated with bright ochreous. Forewings elongate, costa moderately arched, apex rounded, termen rounded, oblique; dark fuscous with some whitish ochreous admixture; scale-tufts blackish tipped with ochreous (a basal one and plical and first discal spots); an obscure costa before apex : fringes concolorous with wing, but with faint darker basal line. Hindwings dark brownish fuscous : fringes dark fuscous with darker basal line.

== Distribution ==
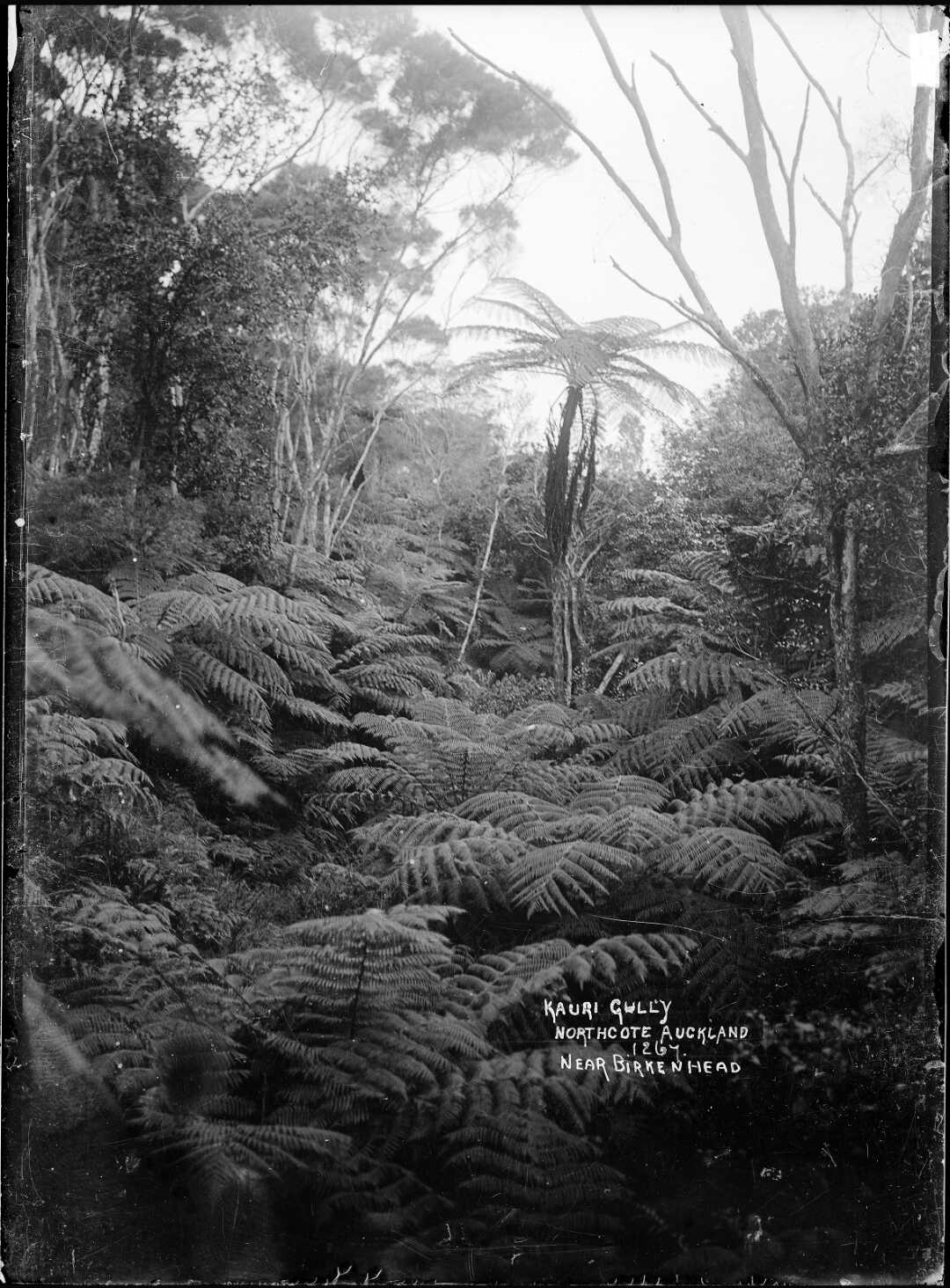
View of Kauri Gully, Northcote, Auckland

This species is endemic to New Zealand. This species has been collected at the type locality of Kauri Gully as well as at other locations in Auckland and once on the West Coast.

== Biology and behaviour ==
The adults of this species are on the wing in November and January.

== Conservation status ==
In 2015 and again in 2025 this species was classified as being "Data Deficient" by the Department of Conservation under the New Zealand Threat Classification System.
