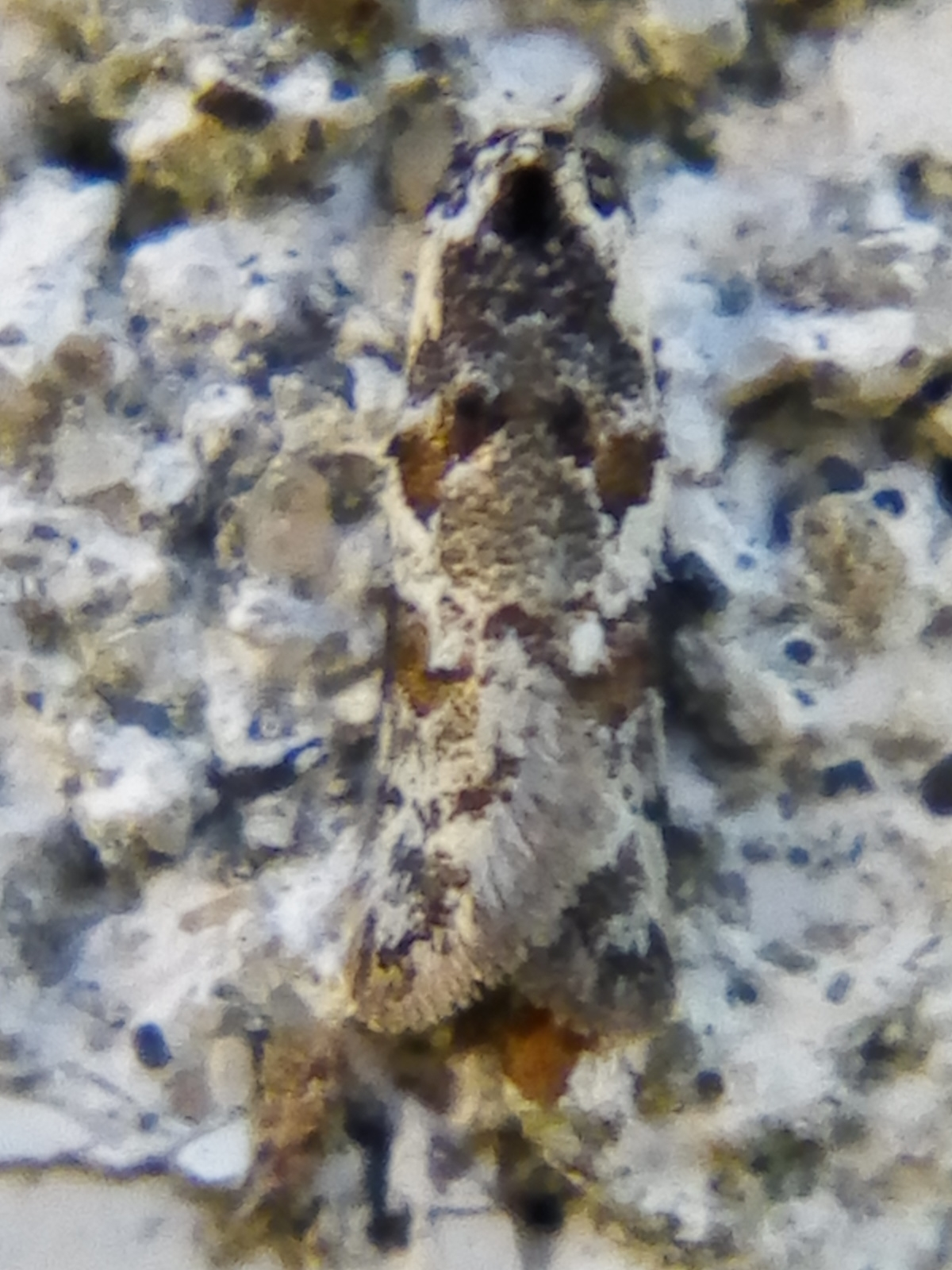

Scientific classification
- Kingdom: Animalia
- Phylum: Arthropoda
- Class: Insecta
- Order: Lepidoptera
- Family: Oecophoridae
- Genus: Trachypepla
- Species: T. galaxias

Binomial name
- Trachypepla galaxias Meyrick, 1883

= Trachypepla galaxias =

Species of moth endemic to New Zealand

Trachypepla galaxias is a moth of the family Oecophoridae first described by Edward Meyrick in 1883. It is endemic to New Zealand and can be found throughout the country. This species inhabits native forest. The life history of this species is currently unknown. Adults are on the wing from October to February, are nocturnal and are attracted to light.

== Taxonomy ==
This species was first described by Edward Meyrick in 1883 and named Trachypepla galaxias using specimens collected at Hamilton, Wellington and at the Bealey River. Later that same year Meyrick gave another abbreviated description of the species. In 1884 Meyrick gave a much fuller description of T. galaxias. In 1928 George Hudson discussed and illustrated this species in his book The butterflies and moths of New Zealand. The male lectotype, collected in heath-like scrub and swamp in Hamilton, is held at the Natural History Museum, London.

== Description ==
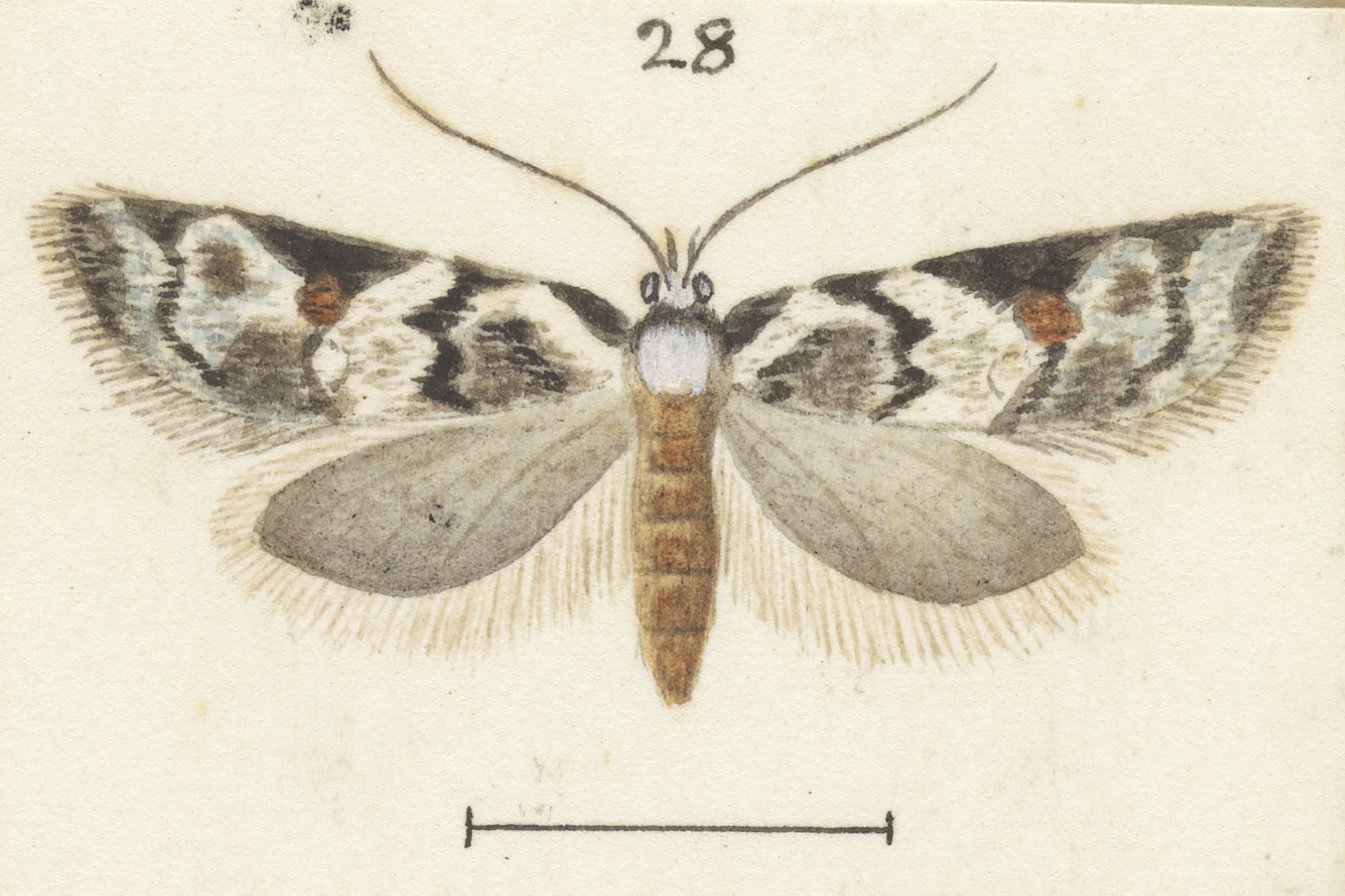
Illustration by George Hudson.

Meyrick described this species as follows:

Male, female.— 14-16 mm. Head white. Palpi white, second joint externally dark fuscous, except towards apex, apex of terminal joint blackish. Antenna grey. Thorax dark grey, irregularly mixed with white. Abdomen grey. Legs dark fuscous, middle tibiae with whitish central and apical wings, posterior tibiae grey- whitish, all tarsi with whitish rings at apex of joints. Forewings elongate, costa moderately arched, apex rounded, hindmargin very obliquely rounded; white, with a few scattered grey scales; a small dark fuscous spot at base of costa; a dark grey transverse band near base, its inner edge more or less near to base and suffused into ground-colour, outer edge extending from 1/4 of costa to 1/3 of inner margin, edged with blackish and almost rectangularly angulated outwards in middle, preceded by a black tuft of raised scales above and below middle, between which are some ferruginous scales; a triangular dark grey patch on costa about middle, its apex touching a ferruginous irregularly blackish-margined spot in disc, and connected with inner margin beyond middle by a twice strongly dentate blackish line; a suffused grey spot on costa at 3/4 another on middle of hindmargin, and sometimes a larger one on inner margin before anal angle, sometimes all partially confluent; a slender cloudy blackish transverse line from costal spot to anal angle, irregularly sinuate, and strongly dentate inwards beneath costa : cilia whitish, with two cloudy dark grey lines. Hindwings grey, apex and hindmargin darker; cilia grey- whitish, with a faint darker line.

== Distribution ==
This species is endemic to New Zealand and can be found throughout the country.

== Behaviour ==
The adult moths of T. galaxias are on the wing from October to February. They are nocturnal and are attracted to light.

== Habitat and hosts ==
The species inhabits native forest. As at 2014 the life history of this species is unknown, however the larvae of a related species, T. contritella, feed and pupates on lichen species in the genus Usnea. It has been hypothesised that the larvae of this species does similar.
