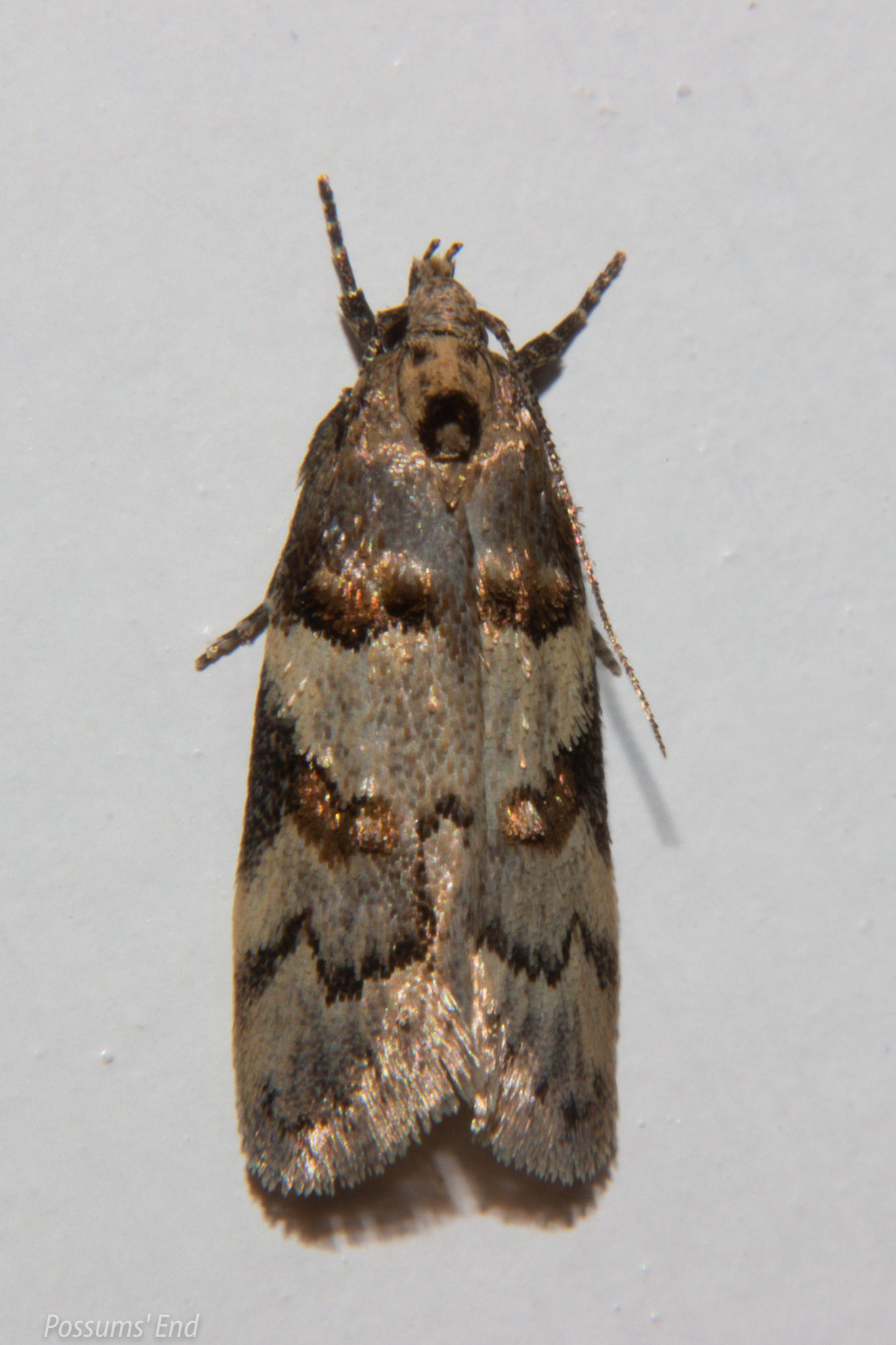

Scientific classification
- Kingdom: Animalia
- Phylum: Arthropoda
- Class: Insecta
- Order: Lepidoptera
- Family: Oecophoridae
- Genus: Trachypepla
- Species: T. contritella

Binomial name
- Trachypepla contritella (Walker, 1864)

Synonyms
- Gelechia contritella Walker, 1864; Trachypepla nyctopis Meyrick, 1883

= Trachypepla contritella =

Species of moth endemic to New Zealand

Trachypepla contritella, the Kiwi Enigma, is a species of moth in the family Oecophoridae. Originally endemic to New Zealand this species can be found throughout that country. However, from 2012 this species has been also been recorded in the United Kingdom. The preferred habitat of T. conritella is New Zealand native forest and larvae of this species are litter leaf feeders. Adults are on the wing from November to February in New Zealand and are attracted to light.

== Taxonomy ==
This species was first described by Francis Walker in 1864 using a specimen collected by T. R. Oxley and named Gelechia contritella. In 1915 Edward Meyrick placed this species in the genus Trachypepla and synonymised Trachypepla nyctopis with this species. However J. S. Dugdale has raised doubts about this synonymisation as there are differences in the genitalia of specimens collected at the type localities of these species. George Hudson in his 1928 book The butterflies and moths of New Zealand described and illustrated this species. The female holotype specimen, collected in Nelson, is held at the Natural History Museum, London.

== Description ==
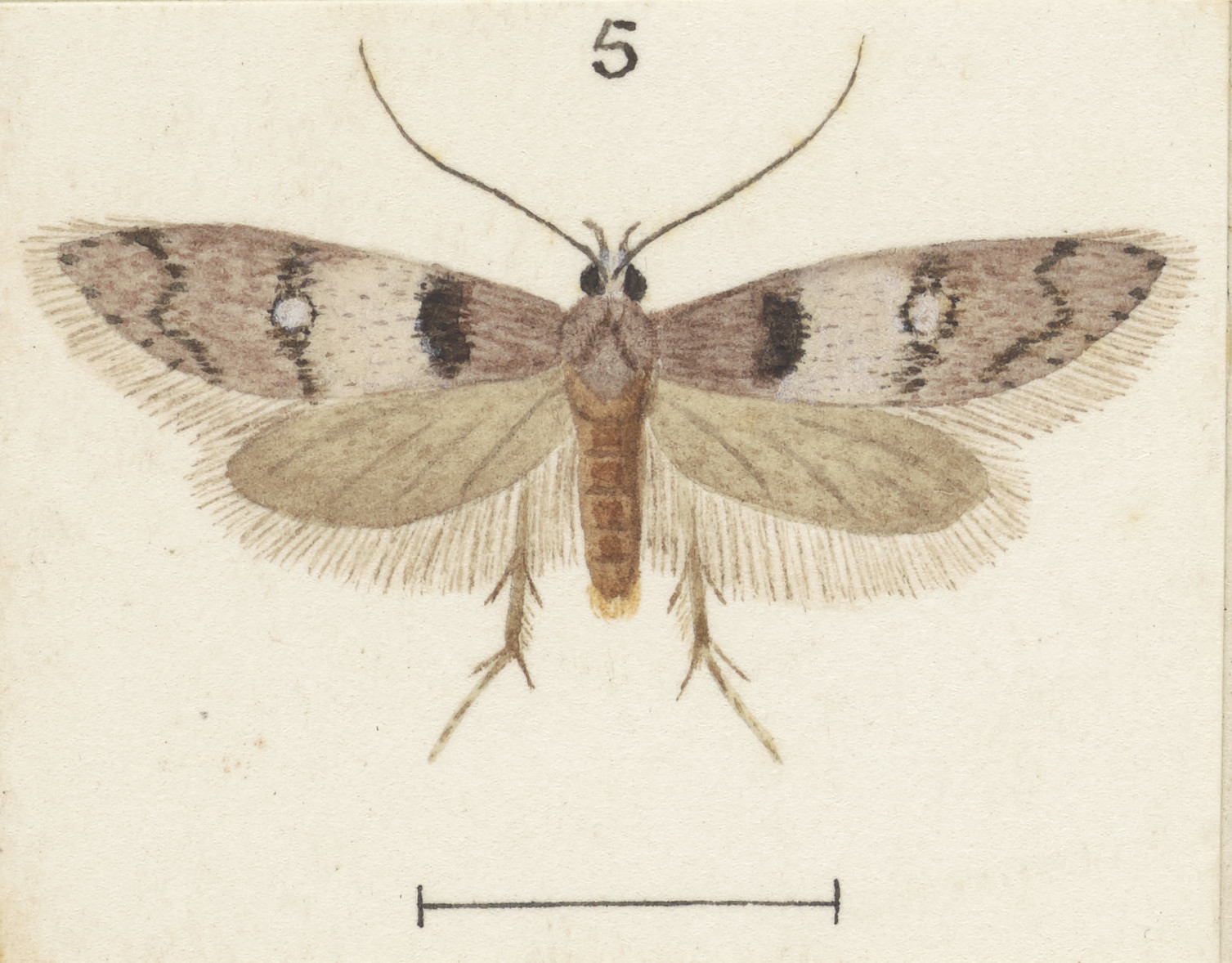
Illustration of male by Hudson.

Walker described the female of the species as follows:

Female. Cinereous. Palpi much longer than the breadth of the head, slightly speckled with black; third joint lanceolate, much shorter than the second. Antennae slender, much shorter than the fore wings. Legs slender. Wings moderately broad, hardly acute. Fore wings minutely speckled with black, with a broad whitish middle band, which is dilated hindward and is incompletely bordered with black; an exterior black oblique line, acutely angular in front, where it is abbreviated; exterior border slightly convex, very oblique. Hind wings shining, slightly tinged with aeneous; fringe long. Length of the body 3 lines; of the wings 8 lines.

Hudson described this species as follows:

The expansion of the wings is about 5/8 inch. The forewings are elongate with the apex rounded and the termen very oblique; pale purplish-grey; there is a conspicuous outwards curved thick blackish transverse line with two tufts of raised scales at about 1/4, rather indistinct on the costa and dorsum; beyond this there is usually a paler central area, another oblique transverse line is situated on the costa at about 1/2 and encloses two tufts of raised scales; there is a wavy transverse line from the costa at 3/4 to the tornus and a series of indistinct terminal dots. The hind-wings are greyish-ochreous, darker towards the apex.

This species is variable in both the richness of the ground colour, the markings on its forewings and the paler central area on the forewings. Hudson was of the opinion that the colouration of this moth imitated dull grey coloured lichens.

== Distribution ==
This species was originally endemic to New Zealand and has been observed throughout that country. Since the 2010s this species has been observed in the United Kingdom. It was first observed at Eaton Ford in 2012, and has subsequently also been observed in Huntingdonshire.

== Habitat and hosts ==
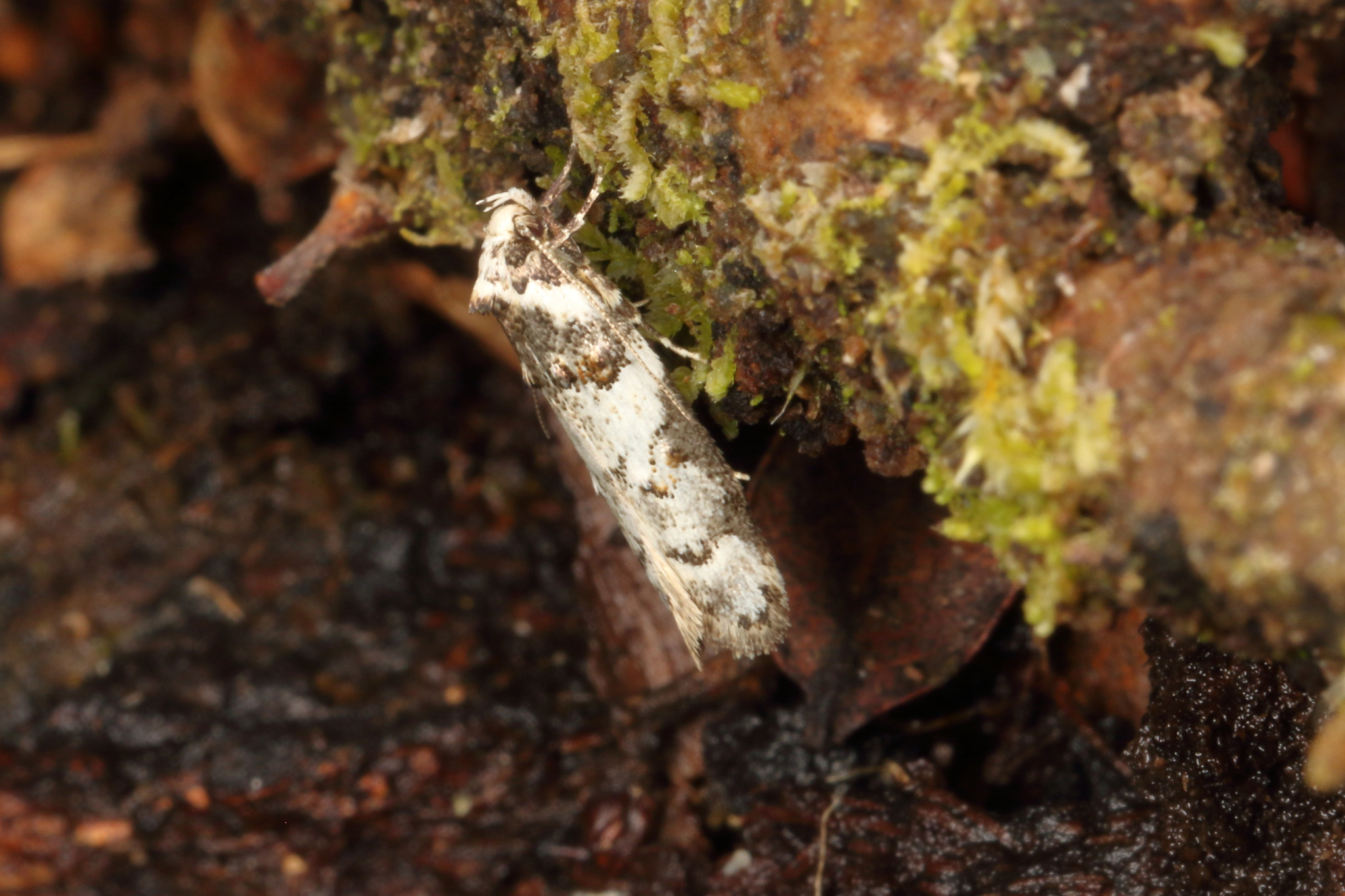
T. contritella in native forest.

T. contritella inhabits native forest and in the South Island of New Zealand is common in beech forest. The larvae of this species feed on leaf litter. This species also feeds and pupates on lichen species in the genus Usnea.

== Behaviour ==
Adults are on the wing in New Zealand in from November to February and are attracted to light.
