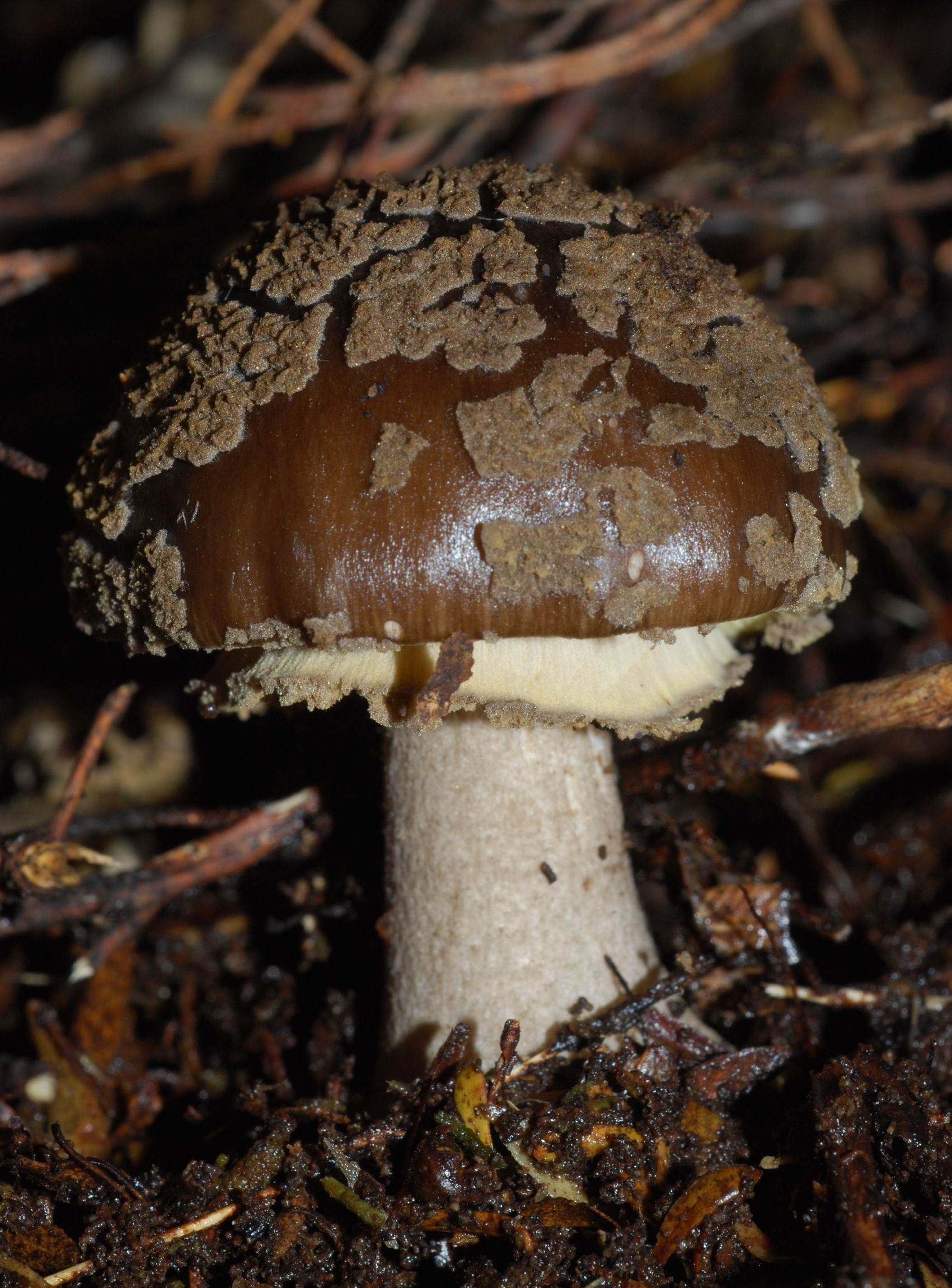

Scientific classification
- Domain: Eukaryota
- Kingdom: Fungi
- Division: Basidiomycota
- Class: Agaricomycetes
- Order: Agaricales
- Family: Amanitaceae
- Genus: Amanita
- Species: A. nothofagi

Binomial name
- Amanita nothofagi G.Stev. (1962)

= Amanita nothofagi =

Species of fungus

Amanita nothofagi Mycological characteristics
- Gills on hymenium
- Cap is flat or convex
- Hymenium is free
- Stipe has a ring and volva
- Spore print is white
- Ecology is mycorrhizal
- Edibility is unknown

Amanita nothofagi is a species of fungus in the family Amanitaceae. Endemic to New Zealand, the species was first described by mycologist Greta Stevenson in 1962. The fruit bodies have dark brown caps that are up to 13 cm (5.1 in) in diameter and covered with patches of soft greyish-brown scales or warts. The gills underneath the cap are crowded together, free from attachment to the stem, and white, becoming tinged with yellow in age. The stem of the mushroom is 4–14 cm (1.6–5.5 in) long by 0.5–2.5 cm (0.2–1.0 in) thick, and has a ring. The spore print is white, and individual spores are spherical to ellipsoid, measuring 7.5–9 by 7.5–9 micrometres. The mushroom may be confused with another New Zealand species, A. australis, but can be distinguished by certain characteristics. Amanita nothofagi is a mycorrhizal species, and grows in association with native New Zealand trees such as southern beech.

== Taxonomy ==
The species was first described as a new species by New Zealand mycologist Greta Stevenson, who collected specimens in the mid-1950s in Nelson and Cape Farewell, via the Royal Botanic Garden's journal Kew Bulletin in 1962 (the second part of a five-part series of articles describing the mushroom flora of the country). The specific epithet nothofagi refers to Nothofagus, the genus of Southern beeches with which the species is often associated. Amanita authority Rodham Tulloss uses the common name "southern beech Amanita", while Geoff Ridley suggests "charcoal flycap".

Stevenson classified Amanita nothofagi in the section Phalloideae of the genus Amanita, but Ridley considered it better placed in section Validae because of its "subglobose basidiospores, a clavate or occasionally abruptly bulbous stipe base, with sparse bands or a rim of volva material".

== Description ==
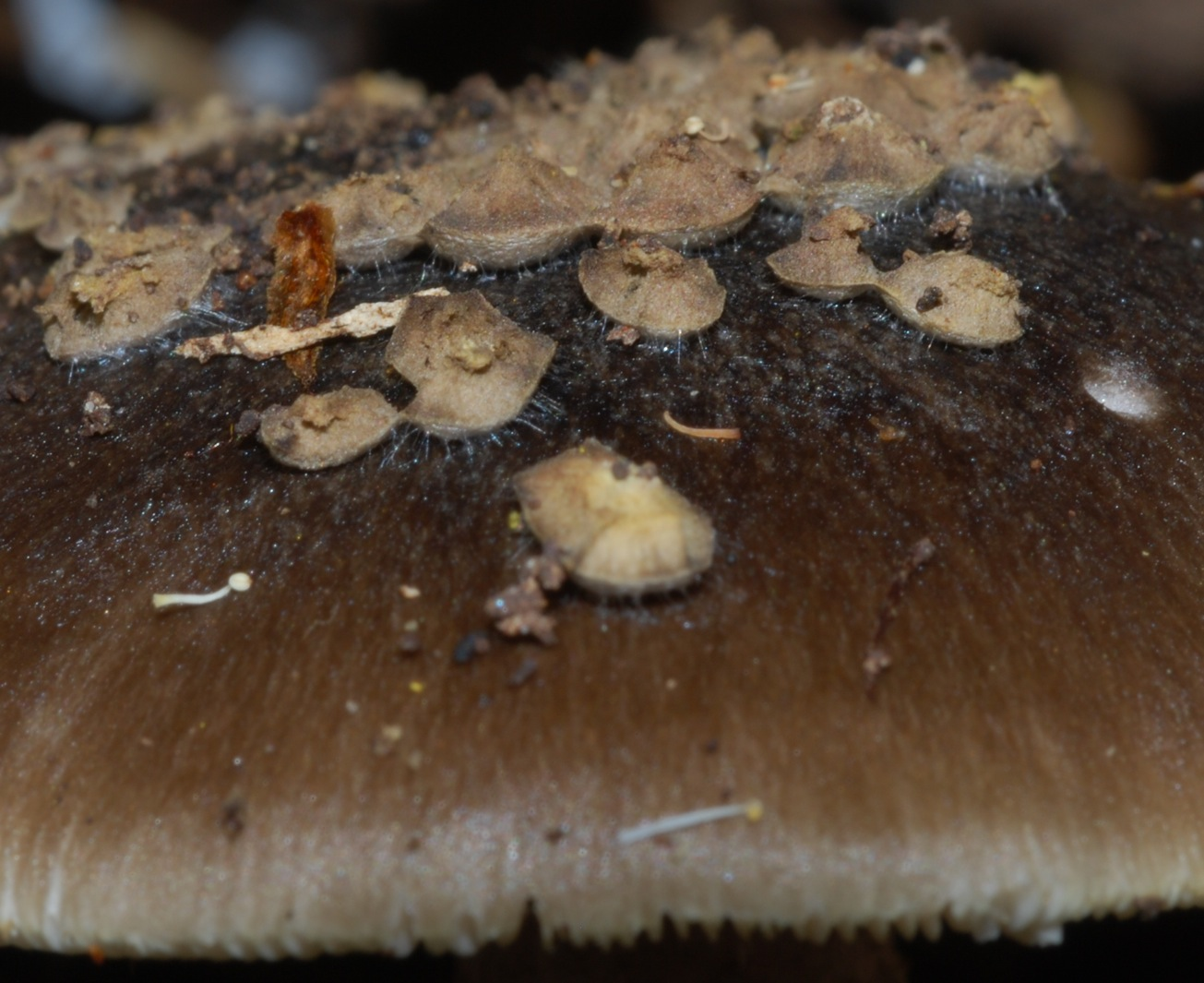
The cap surface showing dull greyish-sepia warts

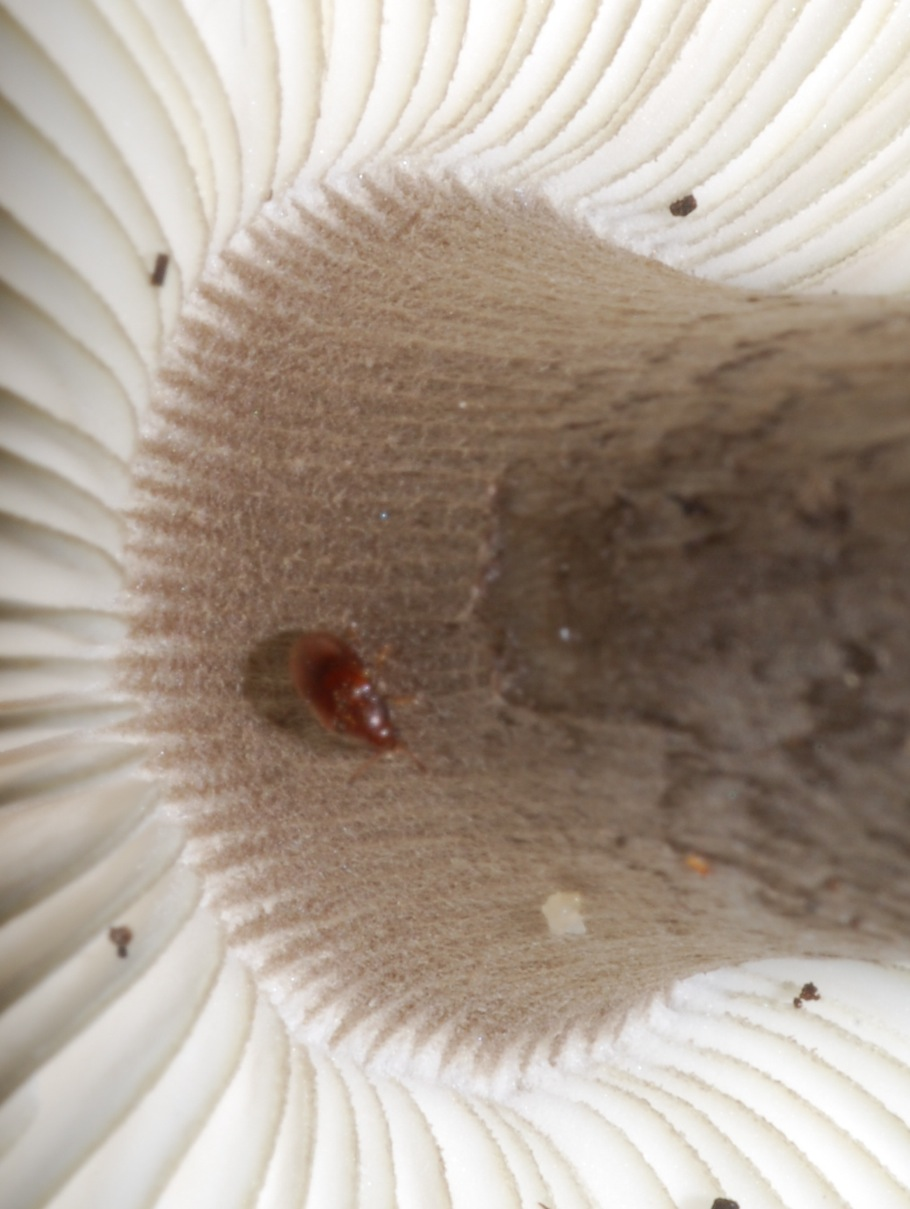
The white gills are crowded together and free from attachment to the stem.

The cap of A. nothofagi is initially convex, later becoming flattened with a central depression, with radial grooves on the margin, reaching diameters of 3–13 centimetres (1–5 inches). The colour is variable, ranging from buff to dark grey to greyish-sepia, with radial streaks of dusky brownish grey. The cap surface is sticky when young or wet, but dries out with age. The remnants of the volva form small to large, irregularly shaped, felted patches, that are dull greyish-sepia to sepia, and sometimes scab-like. The gills are crowded closely together, and free from attachment to the stem. They are white to cream-coloured, 6–10 mm (1/4–3/8 in) wide. The lamellulae (short gills that do not extend fully from the cap edge to the stem) have somewhat truncated ends.

The stem is 4–14 cm (1 5/8–5 1/2 in) high, 5–25 mm (1/4–1 in) thick, and tapers slightly at the top. It is hollow and has a bulbous base measuring 10–30 mm (3/8–1 1/8 in) in diameter. The stem surface above the level of the ring is white, sparsely covered with woolly or fuzzy tufts, occasionally breaking into transverse bands; below the ring the stem surface is smooth or occasionally breaks into bands or fibrillose scales. It is whitish, buff or greyish-sepia streaked with grey. The stem base may or may not have a band or rim of buff to greyish-sepia volval remnants. The ring is membranous, grooved, whitish, buff, and greyish-sepia or lavender-grey. It first hangs freely before later sticking to the stem, often tearing and adhering to the edge of the cap. The flesh of the cap is white or stained mouse-grey under the central part, occasionally with a grey line above the gills; the stem flesh is white to pale buff.

The spore print is white. The spores are typically 7.5–9 by 7.5–9 μm, spherical to broadly ellipsoid to ellipsoid, and thin-walled. Under a microscope, the spores appear hyaline (translucent), and are amyloid—meaning they will turn bluish-black to black when stained with Melzer's reagent. The basidia are 30.5–57 by 8–16 μm, four-spored, and not clamped at the base. The margin cells of the gills are plentiful, spherical, club-shaped or swollen spherically at the tip, hyaline, and measure 13–58 by 8–33 μm. The cap cuticle consists of a 130–220 μm wide, strongly gelatinised suprapellis (upper layer) and a dense, non-gelatinised subpellis (lower layer). The volval remnants on the cap are made of abundant spherical, elliptic and club-shaped cells that are 21–119 by 14.5–115 μm, intermixed with hyphae 4–9 μm wide and pale umber in colour, and either arranged irregularly, or with a vertical orientation.

=== Similar species ===
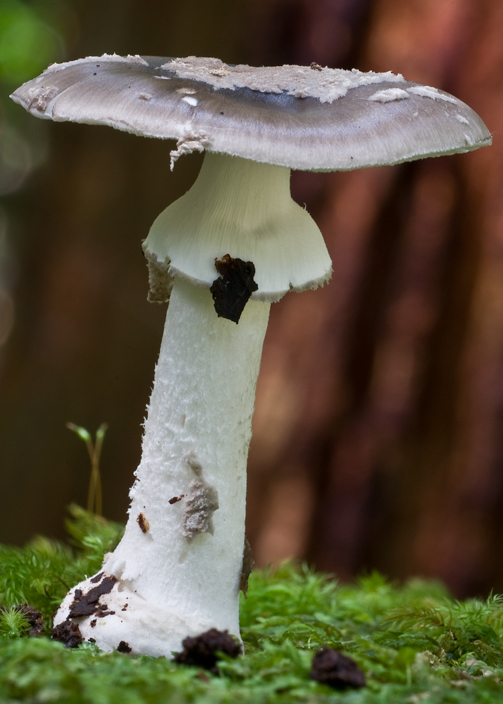
A. luteofusca

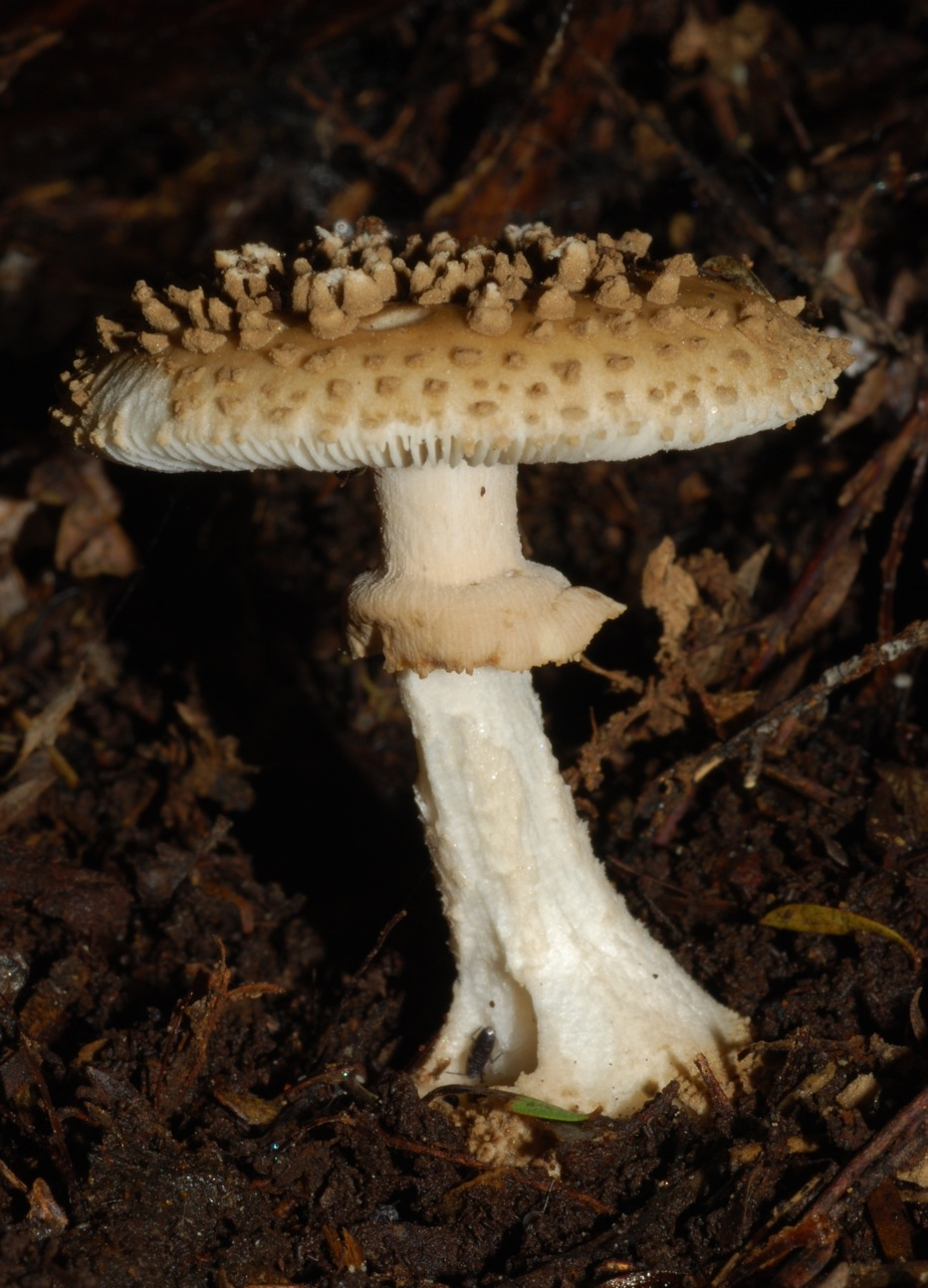
A. australis

Amanita nothofagi mushrooms can be confused with A. australis if the warts have been washed off and the colour has been bleached. A reliable method to distinguish the two is to check for the presence of clamp connections at the bases of the basidia, which are present in A. australis and absent from A. nothofagi. Ridley notes that the type collection was made with a dark grey specimen, and later collectors who found browner specimens have had difficulty in correctly identifying the species. Paler specimens resemble A. excelsa, which led some to incorrectly believe that the species occurs in New Zealand. A. luteofusca is also similar in appearance, spore size, amyloid reaction, and lack of clamp connections in the basidia. It is distinguished from A. nothofagi largely on the basis of colour; it is a greyish-brown to yellowish-grey brown that fades to pinkish-buff as it gets older. Tulloss suggests that the resemblance of a number of species from Australasia and Chile which lack brightly coloured fruit bodies and share similar greyish to brownish rings and volvas may indicate that they share Gondwanan ancestors.

== Distribution and habitat ==
The fruit bodies of Amanita nothofagi grow solitarily or in scattered groups. Like all Amanita mushrooms, it is mycorrhizal, and grows in close association with Southern Beech (genus Nothofagus) (including New Zealand Red Beech, Silver beech, New Zealand Black Beech, and Hard Beech), Manuka, and Kanuka. Found on both the North and South islands of New Zealand, it is the most common of the country's endemic Amanita species.

== See also ==
- List of Amanita species
