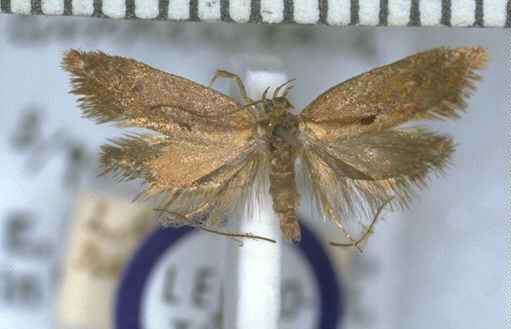
- Male lectotype

Scientific classification
- Kingdom: Animalia
- Phylum: Arthropoda
- Class: Insecta
- Order: Lepidoptera
- Family: Oecophoridae
- Genus: Tingena
- Species: T. oxyina

Binomial name
- Tingena oxyina (Meyrick, 1883)

Synonyms
- Cremnogenes oxyina Meyrick, 1883; Borkhausenia oxyina (Meyrick, 1883)

= Tingena oxyina =

Species of moth, endemic to New Zealand

Tingena oxyina is a species of moth in the family Oecophoridae. It is endemic to New Zealand and has been observed in the Otago region. This species inhabits native beech forest at altitudes of between 1000 – 3000 ft. Adults of this species are on the wing in January.

== Taxonomy ==
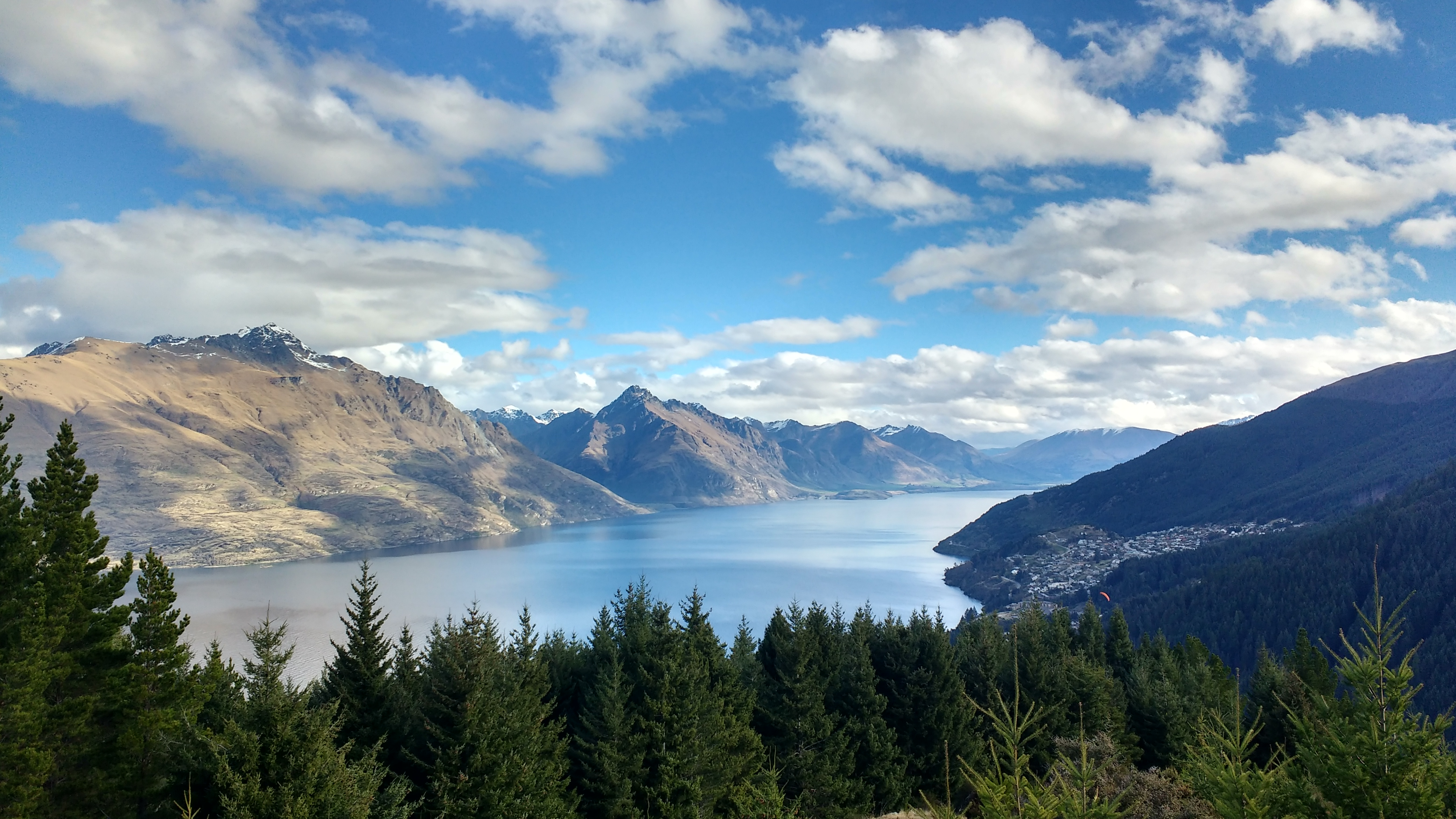
Lake Wakatipu, type locality of T. oxyina.

This species was first described by Edward Meyrick in 1883 using specimens collected at Lake Wakatipu and named Cremnogenes oxyina. Meyrick went on to give a more detailed description in 1884. In 1915 Meyrick placed this species within the Borkhausenia genus. In 1926 Alfred Philpott studied the genitalia of the male of this species. George Hudson discussed and illustrated this species under the name B. oxyina in his 1928 publication The butterflies and moths of New Zealand. The illustration by George Hudson, as figured below, was regarded by J. S. Dugdale as a pale representation of the species. In 1988 Dugdale placed this species in the genus Tingena. The male lectotype is held at the Natural History Museum, London.

== Description ==
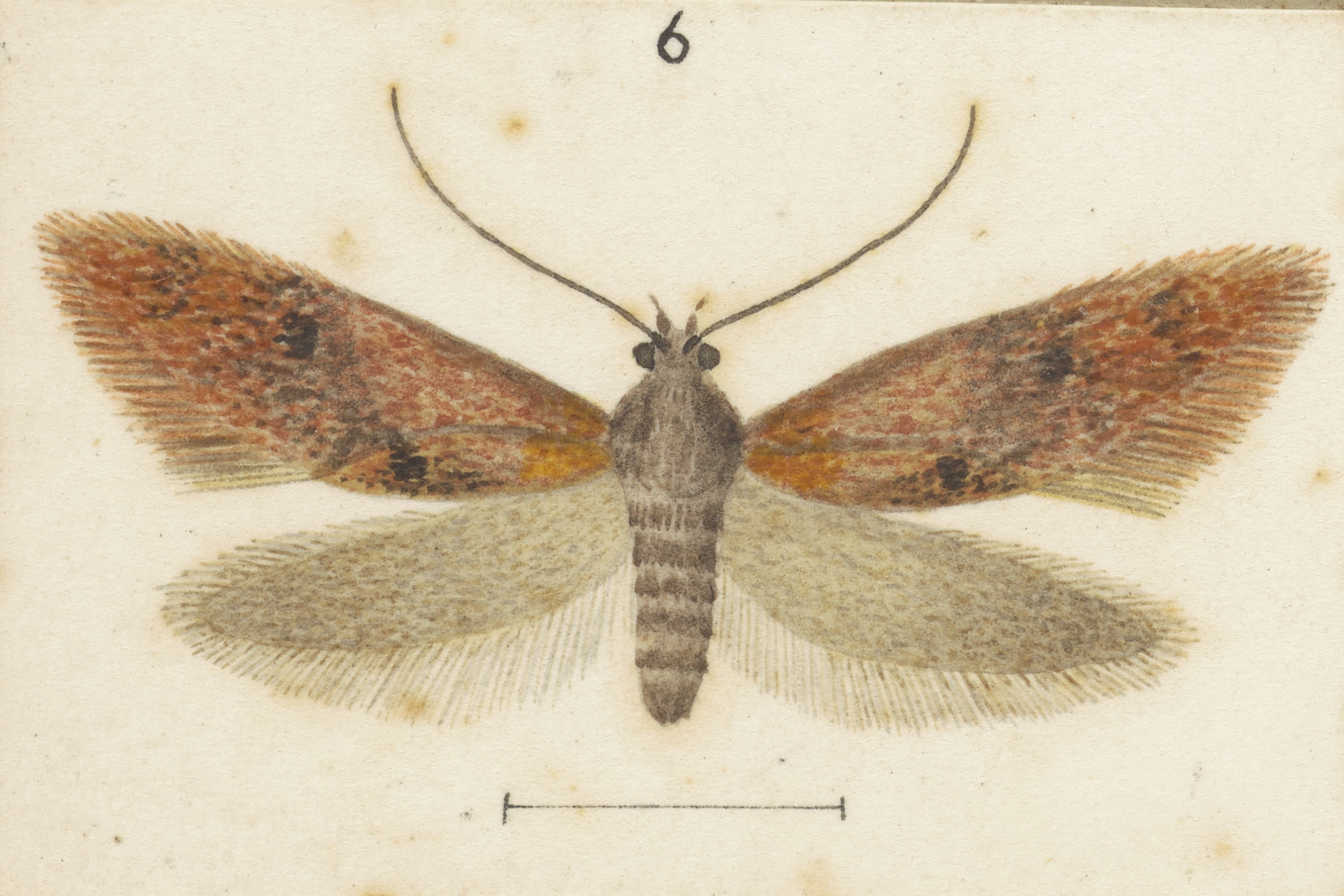
Illustration of T. osyina by George Hudson.

Meyrick first described this species as follows:

Fore wings in male dark fuscous mixed with ferruginous, in female reddish-ochreous, sometimes with a pale indented dorsal streak, a spot beneath fold and discal dot blackish; hind wings dark fuscous.

Meyrick gave a more detailed description as follows:

Male, female.— 13–15 mm (0.5–0.6 in). Head, palpi, antennae, thorax, and abdomen dark fuscous, slightly ochreous-tinged; thorax with a small sharply-defined ochreous-whitish lateral spot. Legs dark fuscous-grey. Forewings in male elongate, in female rather shorter, costa moderately arched, apex pointed, hindmargin slightly sinuate, extremely oblique; dark fuscous, mixed and suffused with reddish-ochreous or ferruginous, in female almost wholly reddish-ochreous, becoming deeper along fold; an ochreous-whitish, often indistinct or obsolete, streak along inner margin from base to 3/4, attenuated posteriorly, upper margin deeply dentate before middle, indentation filled with a small black spot; a dark fuscous dot in disc beyond middle, in male obscure; a curved transverse dark fuscous line near hindmargin, often obsolete : cilia in male ferruginous mixed with dark fuscous, in female reddish-ochreous, lighter towards tips. Hindwings dark fuscous-grey; with a dark fuscous line near base.

Meyrick stated that this species could be distinguished from its close relatives by its reddish-ochreous colouring and that the female of this species was very similar in appearance to the larger T. phegophylla.

== Distribution ==
This species is endemic to New Zealand and has been observed in the Otago region.

== Behaviour ==
Adults of this species are on the wing in January.

== Habitat ==
This species has been observed in Nothofagus solandri dominant native beech forest at altitudes of between 1000 – 3000 ft.
