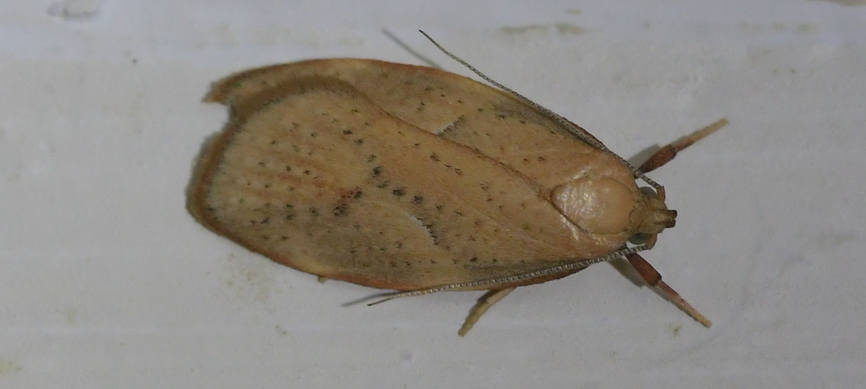

Scientific classification
- Kingdom: Animalia
- Phylum: Arthropoda
- Class: Insecta
- Order: Lepidoptera
- Family: Depressariidae
- Genus: Proteodes
- Species: P. carnifex

Binomial name
- Proteodes carnifex (Butler, 1877)

Synonyms
- Cryptolechia carnifex Butler, 1877; Cryptolechia rufosparsa Butler, 1877

= Proteodes carnifex =

Species of moth endemic to New Zealand

Proteodes carnifex (also known as the mountain beech flat moth) is a species of moth in the family Depressariidae. It is endemic to New Zealand. Both the larvae and the adults of this species are variable in appearance. However the adults are normally easily identified as the outline is characteristic and the size is consistent. In appearance, adult moths mimic the leaves of their larval host plants. This species has been found near Wellington in the North Island, the tableland of Mount Arthur, in the Canterbury region, Arthur's Pass and at Lake Wakatipu in the South Island. The larval hosts of this species are southern beech trees, particularly black beech (Nothofagus solandri) and mountain beech (Nothofagus cliffortioides) but larvae have also been found on red beech (Nothofagus fusca), hard beech (Nothofagus truncata) and silver beech (Nothofagus menziesii). The female moth deposits her eggs individually on the underside of native beech tree leaves. Once hatched the larvae feed on those leaves through winter and spring and then pupate in January. The adult moth emerges from the pupa after fourteen days and is on the wing from January until April. They are day flying moths and are not attracted to light. Various insects parasitise the larvae of this moth including several species of wasp as well as flies including the endemic fly, Pales funesta.

== Taxonomy ==
This species was first described by Arthur Gardiner Butler in 1877 and named Cryptolechia carnifex. Butler used a specimen collected by John Davies Enys at Castle Hill Station in mid Canterbury. In 1883 Edward Meyrick placed this species within the Proteodes genus and synonymised Cryptolechia rufosparsa with P. carnifex. This placement was confirmed by George Hudson in his book The butterflies and moths of New Zealand and by J. S. Dugdale in his annotated catalogue of New Zealand Lepidoptera. of The male holotype specimen is held in the Natural History Museum, London.

== Description ==
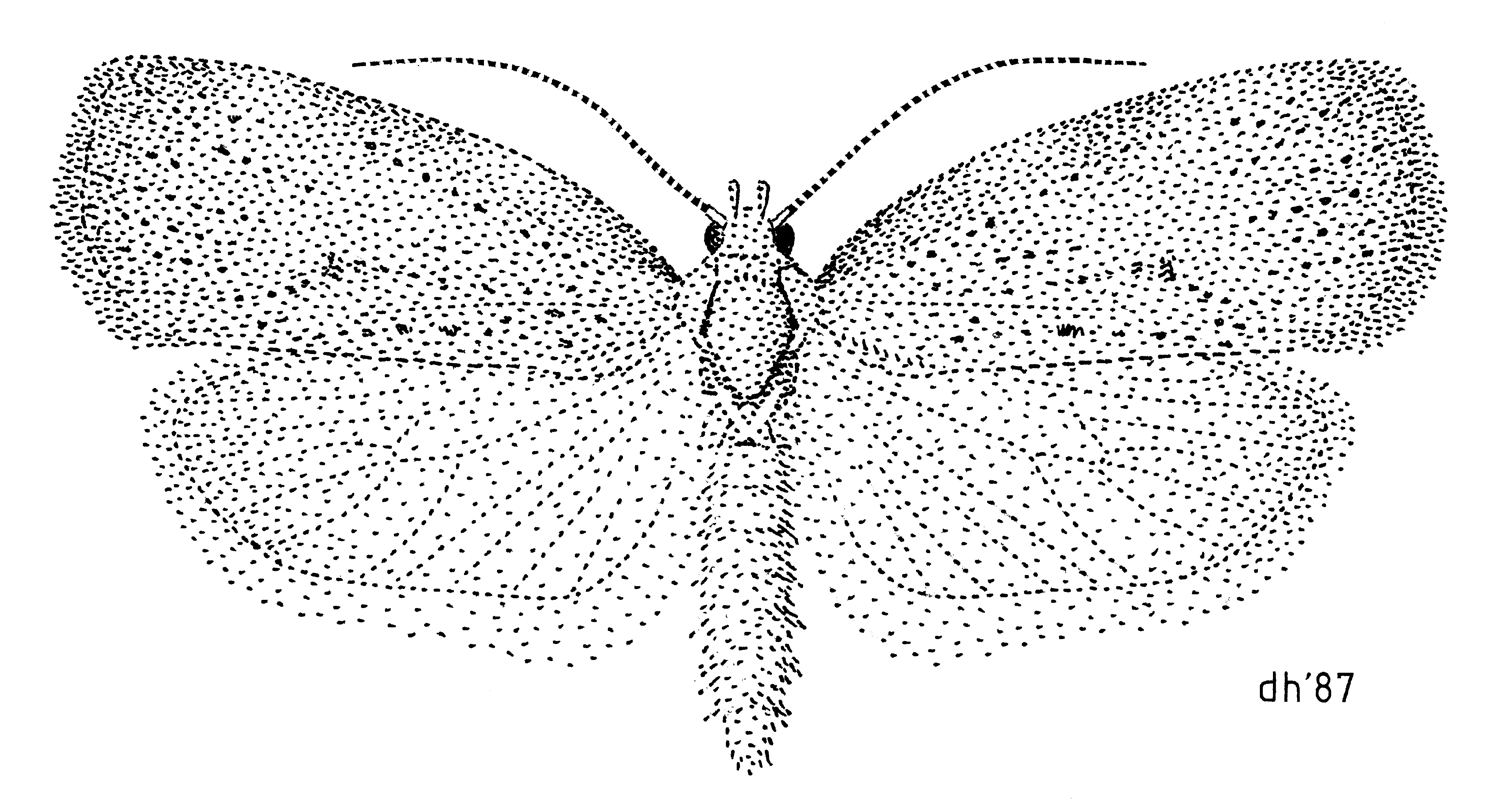
P. carnifex illustrated by Des Helmore.

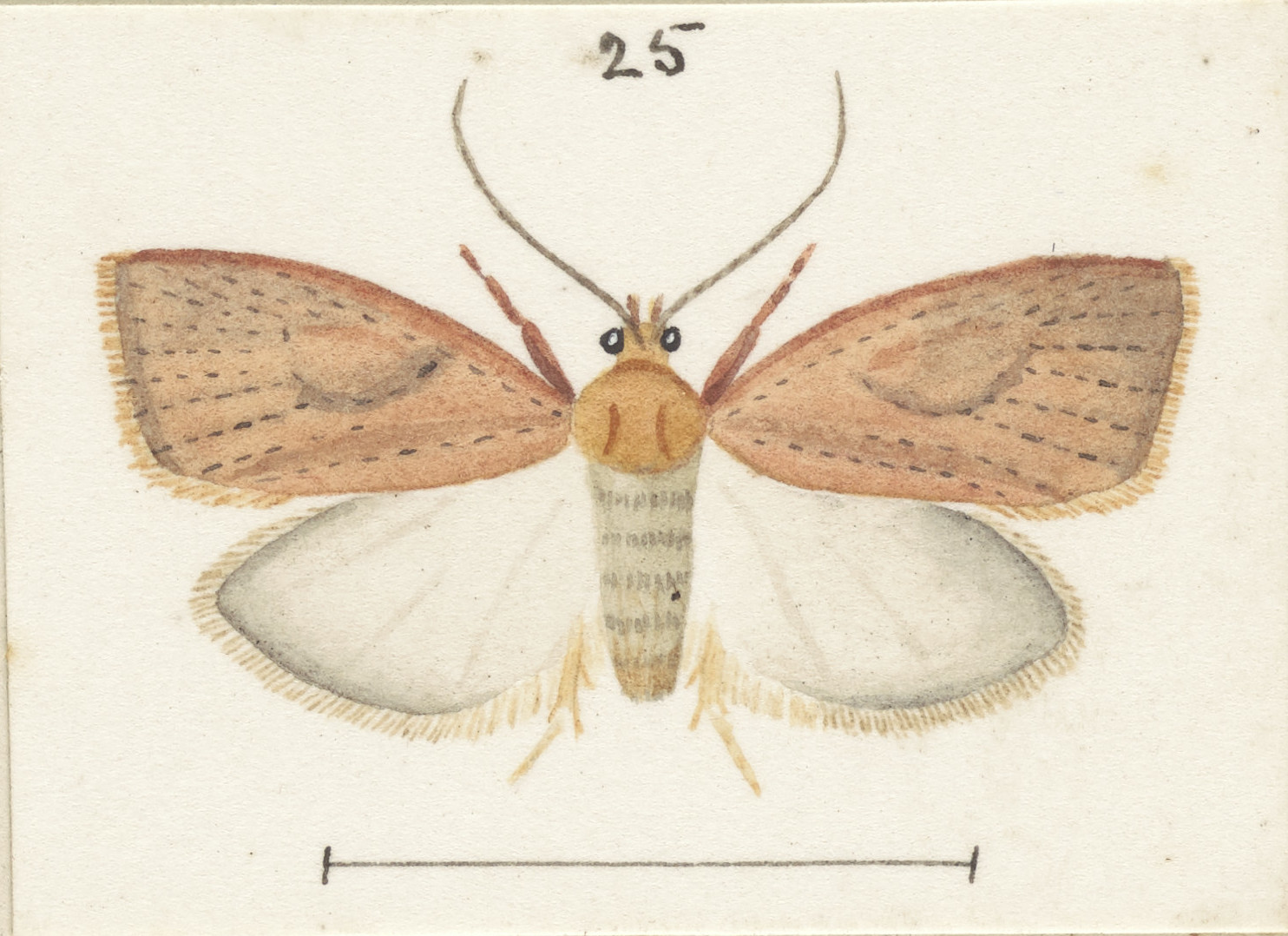
P. carnifex illustrated by George Hudson

The larvae of this species, which has sixteen legs, was described by Hudson as follows:

rather stout, cylindrical, tapering behind; pale whitish-green or yellowish-green, generally more greyish-green on the sides; the dorsal line is broad, irregular, dark brownish-purple, sap-green or yellowish-green mixed with reddish-ochreous and bisected by a slender, interrupted, whitish line; the lateral line is sap green or obsolete; the sub-spiracular line is slender, interrupted, dark brownish purple or faintly pinkish; the spots are small, shining, dark brown; the head is ochreous-brown or yellowish green; the second segment is greener than the body, blackish marbled with pale ochreous, the larva generally being remarkably variable.

Butler described the adults of the species as follows:

Primaries flesh-colour, costal margin blood red, the same colour also extending for a short distance down the fringe, which is throughout rather darker than the body of the wing; secondaries white, slightly tinted with flesh-colour at the borders; thorax flesh-coloured; palpi and femora and tibiae of anterior legs carmine : wings below nearly as above, excepting that the secondaries show three or four apical marginal dark grey spots; body below white. Expanse of wings 11 lines.

Hudson noted that there is variation in the colour of the forewings of this species. It can range from pale greyish-brown, bright reddish or orange brown without markings to clear yellow. However the species is normally easily identified as the outline is characteristic and the size are consistent. In appearance, to assist with camouflage, it approximates the look of faded or fallen beech tree leaves.

== Distribution ==
This species is endemic to New Zealand. It has been found near Wellington in the North Island, the tableland of Mount Arthur, in the Canterbury region, Arthur's Pass and at Lake Wakatipu in the South Island. It is more common in the South Island than in the North Island.

== Behaviour and life cycle ==
The female moth can lay up to 300 eggs and she deposits them individually on the underside of native beech leaves. There is only one generation a year. The larvae feed on those tree leaves from winter to early summer. The larvae make a web of silk and leaf hairs camouflaging themselves amongst the leaves, and proceed to feed from this shelter. It pupates amongst dead leaves making a slight cocoon around the short, stout, pale green and brown pupa. The adult moth emerges from the pupa after approximately fourteen days. The adults are on the wing from January to April. They are a day flying moth and when inactive rest on beech leaves, which their appearance mimics. The adult moths are not attracted to light.

== Hosts and habitat ==
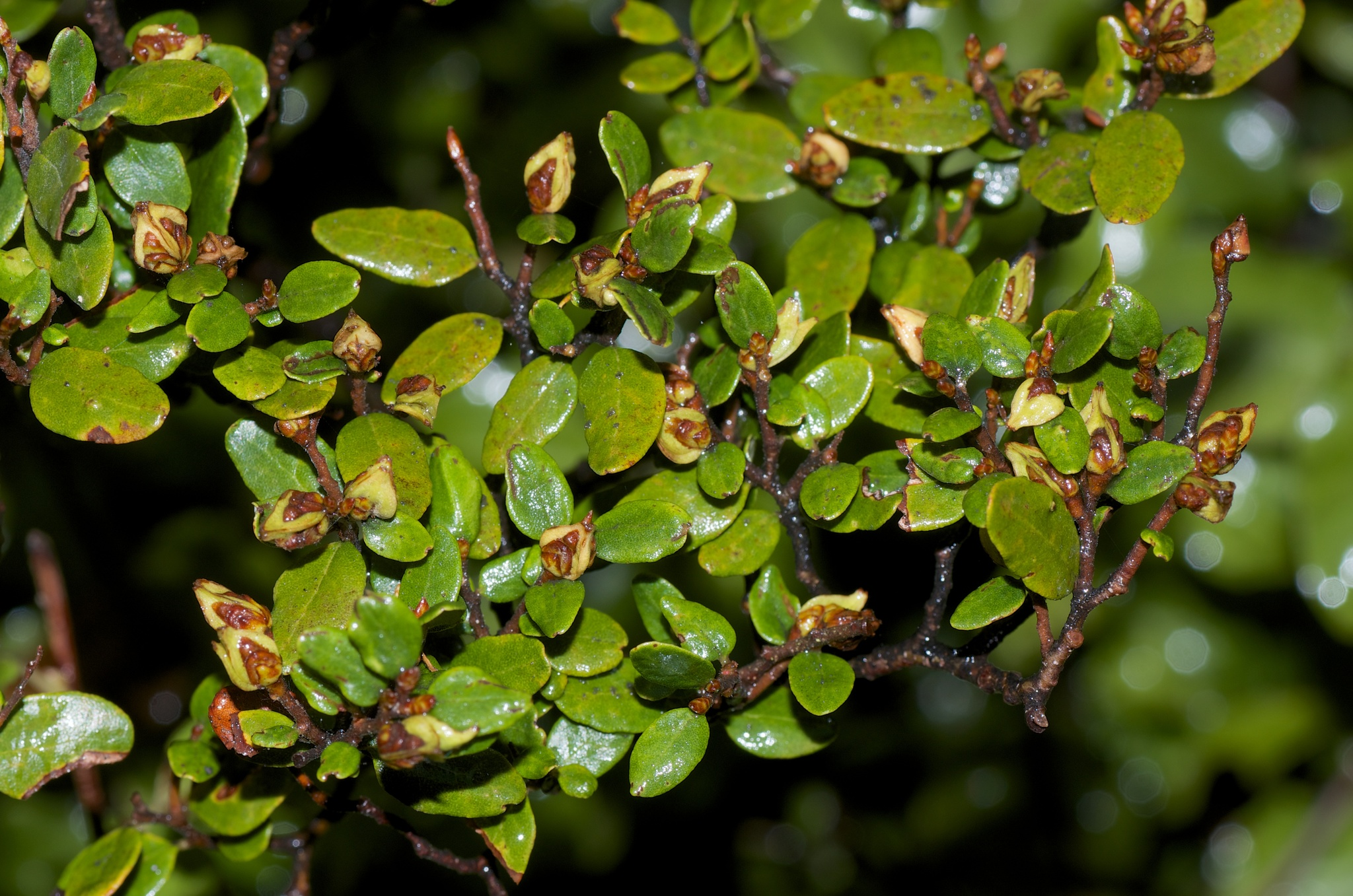
Nothofagus solandri, larval host species.

The larval hosts of this species are southern beech trees particularly black beech (Nothofagus solandri) and mountain beech (Nothofagus cliffortioides) but larvae have also been found on red beech (Nothofagus fusca), hard beech (Nothofagus truncata) and silver beech (Nothofagus menziesii). It prefers native beech forest habitat between 1,000 and 3,500 ft. elevation.

The Mountain Beech Flat Moth can cause extensive, periodic defoliation of large areas of beech forest. Caterpillars in extremely high numbers can literally munch their way through the beech forest canopy, causing discoloration of the leaves, removal of lower buds, defoliation, partial crown death or death of older trees. However, these outbreaks are not very common, and their occurrence is natural. Beech forests typically fully recover within 2–3 years.

== Parasites ==
Various insects parasitise the larvae of this moth including several species of wasp as well as flies. In particular the endemic fly Pales funesta is known to parasitise the larvae of P. carnifex.
