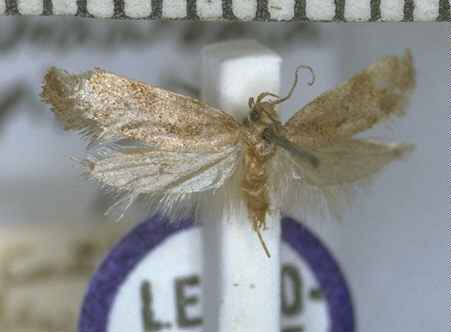
- Male holotype

Scientific classification
- Kingdom: Animalia
- Phylum: Arthropoda
- Class: Insecta
- Order: Lepidoptera
- Family: Oecophoridae
- Genus: Tingena
- Species: T. epimylia

Binomial name
- Tingena epimylia (Meyrick, 1883)

Synonyms
- Oecophora epimylia Meyrick, 1883; Borkhausenia epimylia (Meyrick, 1883)

= Tingena epimylia =

Species of moth, endemic to New Zealand

Tingena epimylia is a species of moth in the family Oecophoridae. It is endemic to New Zealand and is found in both the North and the South Islands. This species is similar in appearance to Tingena contextella as it too has a mottled appearance, but T. epimylia can be distinguished as it is smaller in size, slightly narrower wings, and has a more grey appearance and a grey head. This species inhabits native beech forests at altitudes between 1500 and 2000 ft and in particular has an affinity for Nothofagus solandri.

== Taxonomy ==
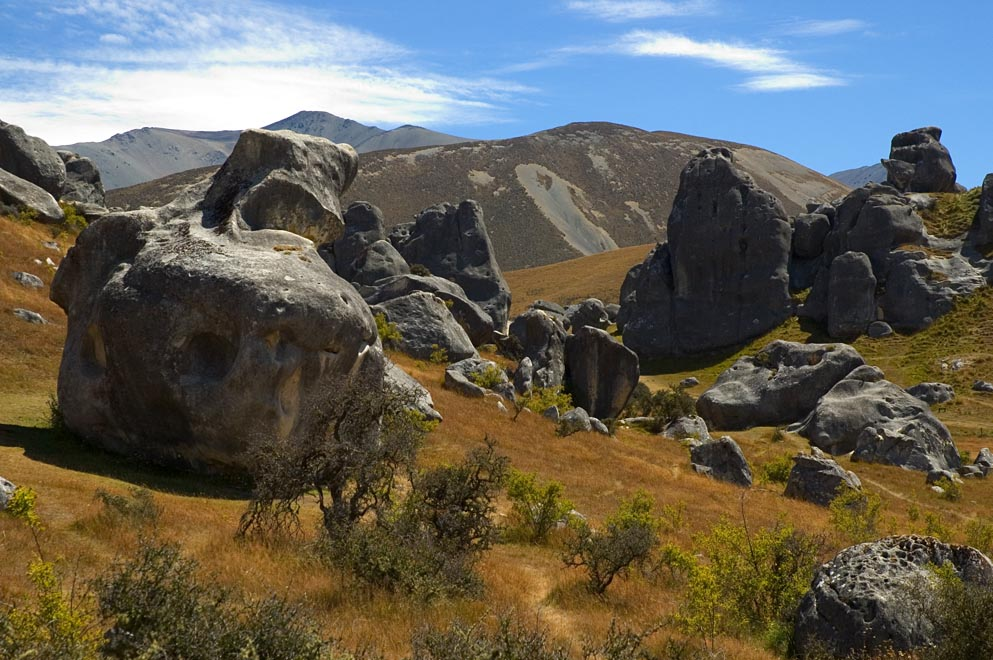
Castle Hill, type locality of T. epimylia.

This species was first described by Edward Meyrick in 1883 using specimens collect at Castle Hill. He originally named the species Oecophora epimylia. Meyrick went on to give a fuller description of the species in 1884. In 1915 Meyrick placed this species within the Borkhausenia genus. In 1926 Alfred Philpott studied the genitalia of the male of this species however his illustrations are considerably different from the gnathos and valva structure of the lectotype and paralectotype. George Hudson discussed this species under the name B. epimylia in his 1928 publication The butterflies and moths of New Zealand. In 1988 J. S. Dugdale placed this species in the genus Tingena. The male lectotype is held at the Natural History Museum, London.

== Description ==
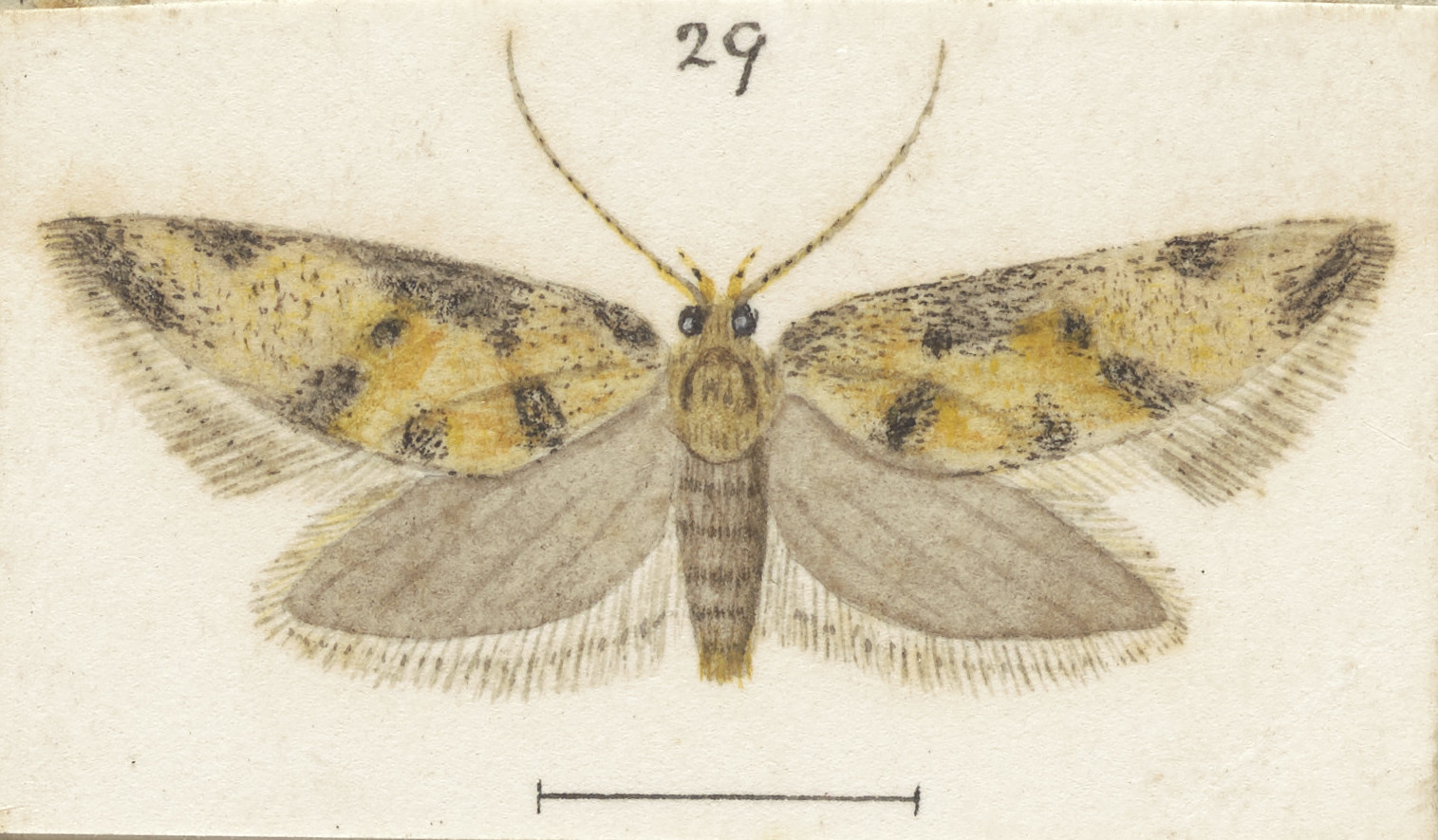
Illustration of T. epimylia by George Hudson.

Meyrick described this species as follows:

Fore wings light grey, three costal spots one on fold, and two discal dots obscurely darker; hind wings grey; head grey.

His more detailed description is as follows:

Male, female.—11 1/2-13 mm. Head and thorax pale grey mixed with darker. Palpi whitish-grey, second joint externally densely irrorated with blackish, terminal joint with two or three slender blackish rings below middle. Antennae dark grey. Abdomen grey. Legs dark fuscous, central and apical ring of middle tibiae, hairs of posterior tibiae, and apex of all tarsal joints whitish. Forewings elongate, costa moderately arched, apex rounded, hindmargin very obliquely rounded; whitish-grey, densely and irregularly irrorated with dark grey, tending to form cloudy very indistinct patches on costa at 1/4, middle, and 3/4, leaving interspaces somewhat paler; an indistinct cloudy dark fuscous spot on fold at 1/3, a cloudy spot on anal angle, sometimes preceded and followed by a smaller spot, a dot in disc before middle and beyond that on fold, and another in disc beyond middle, all very indistinct and sometimes obsolete : cilia whitish-grey, with several rows of dark grey points. Hindwings light grey; cilia whitish-grey.

This species is similar in appearance to Tingena contextella as it too has a mottled appearance, but T. epimylia can be distinguished as it is smaller in size, slightly narrower wings, and has a more grey appearance and a grey head.

== Distribution ==
This species is endemic to New Zealand and has been observed at its type locality of Castle Hill, as well as in the Tararua Ranges, in Nelson, Bealey River, and Lake Wakatipu.

== Habitat ==
This species inhabits native beech forests at altitudes between 1500 and 2000 ft and in particular has an affinity for Nothofagus solandri.
