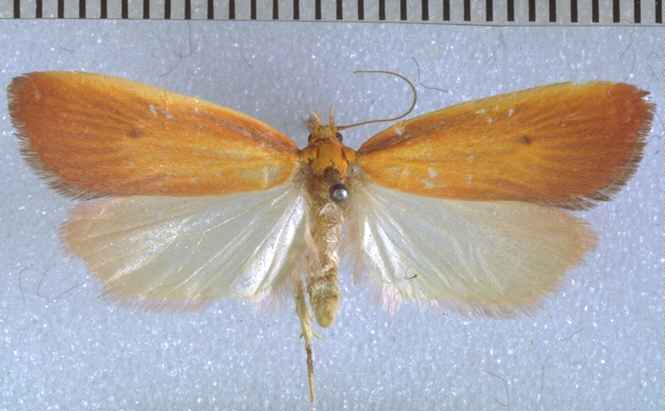
- Male holotype

Scientific classification
- Kingdom: Animalia
- Phylum: Arthropoda
- Class: Insecta
- Order: Lepidoptera
- Family: Depressariidae
- Genus: Proteodes
- Species: P. smithi

Binomial name
- Proteodes smithi Howes, 1946

= Proteodes smithi =

Species of moth endemic to New Zealand

Proteodes smithi is a species of moth in the family Depressariidae. It is endemic to New Zealand and is known from Homer in Fiordland, as well as other localities in the south western parts of the South Island. It has been observed tussock and mixed shrub habitat above the tree line at approximately 1000 m altitude. Adults are on the wing from December until April and are attracted to light.

== Taxonomy ==
This species was described by George Howes in 1946 using a specimen collected in early January at Homer, Fiordland by T. R. Smith, in whose honour this species is named. The male holotype specimen is held at Te Papa.

== Description ==
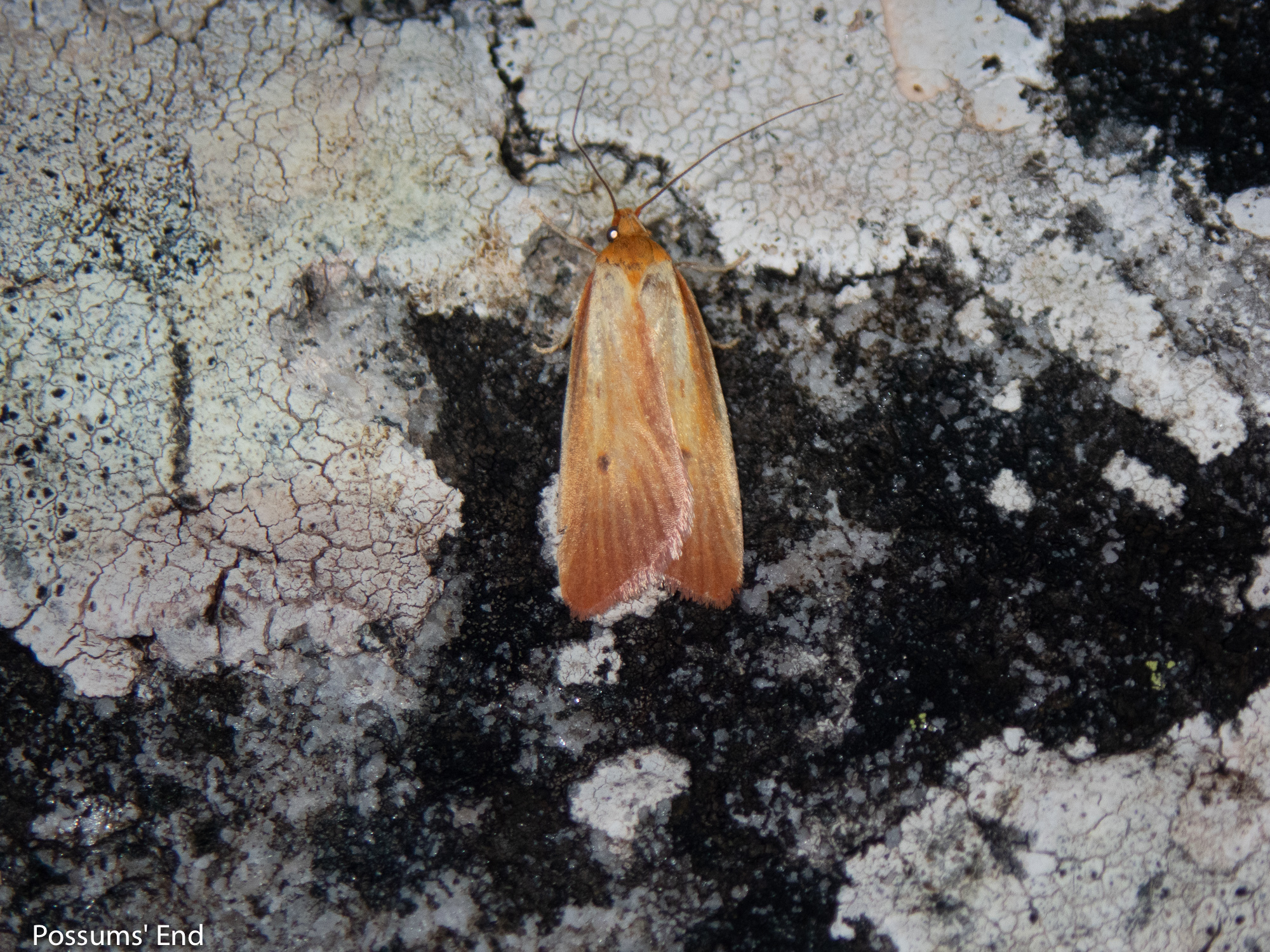
Live Proteodes smithi.

Howes described the species as follows:

Wing expanse 31 mm. Head and face uniform golden brown, antennae brown. Palpi prominent, upcurved, basal portions pink, the tips yellow. Thorax and crests warm brown. First two pairs of legs pink, hindlegs ochreous. Forewings: costa bowed; apex not obtuse—termen rather rounded. An orange band runs along costa narrowing at base and apex. From the base an orange coloured area extends through centre of wing as far as the discal dot. The rest of the forewing is a warm orange brown deepening to warm brown at the termen. Along the veins thin orange coloured streaks extend out towards the termen. Cilia brown, duller than the main wing colouring. Lower wings silvery white with a pink suffusion along the terminal edge. Cilia pink.

This species is similar in appearance to Proteodes clarkei but differs in that the wings are broader, the colouration is brighter and in the male the antennal pectinations are significantly shorter than those of P. clarkei.

== Distribution ==
This species is endemic to New Zealand and known from its type locality of Homer. It has also been observed in the south west of the South Island near Milford Sound and north of Lake Astelia in Southland.

== Habitat ==
The adults of this species have been observed in terrain that contained tussock, mixed scrub and rocks, above the tree line at about 1000 m.

== Behaviour ==
Adults have been observed as being on the wing from December until April. This species is attracted to light.
