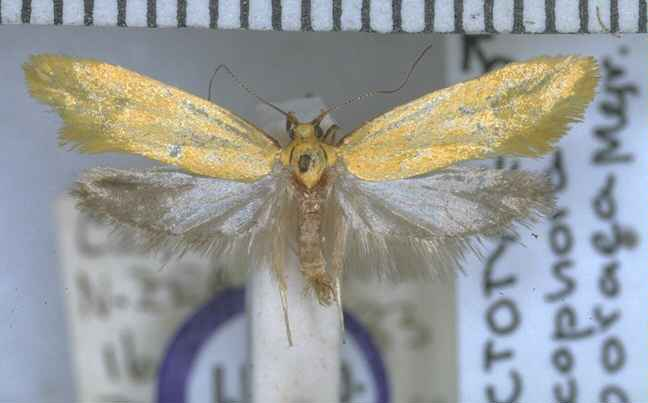
- Male lectotype

Scientific classification
- Kingdom: Animalia
- Phylum: Arthropoda
- Class: Insecta
- Order: Lepidoptera
- Family: Oecophoridae
- Genus: Tingena
- Species: T. oporaea

Binomial name
- Tingena oporaea (Meyrick, 1883)

Synonyms
- Oecophora oporaea Meyrick, 1883; Borkhausenia oporaea (Meyrick, 1883)

= Tingena oporaea =

Species of moth, endemic to New Zealand

Tingena oporaea is a species of moth in the family Oecophoridae. It is endemic to New Zealand and has been observed in Canterbury. The preferred habitat of this species is native beech forest at altitudes of 2500 ft however it has also been collected in tussock grassland. The larvae of this species are leaf litter feeders and the adults are on the wing in January and February.

== Taxonomy ==
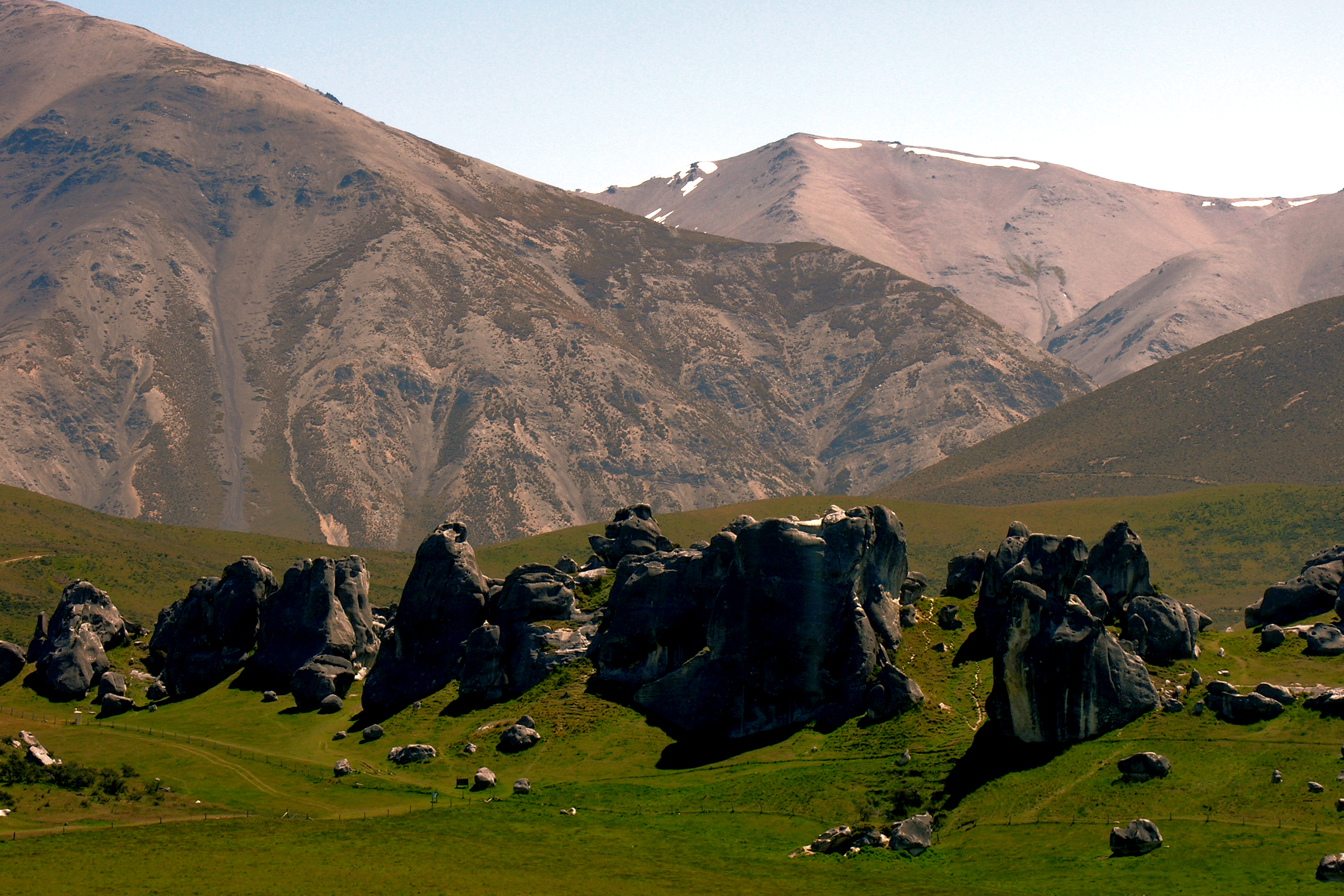
Castle Hill, type locality of T. oporaea.

This species was first described by Edward Meyrick in 1883 and named Oecophora oporaea using specimens collected at Castle Hill in mid Canterbury at an altitude of 25000 ft in January. Meyrick went on to give a more detailed description in 1884. In 1915 Meyrick placed this species within the Borkhausenia genus as a synonym of Borkhausenia apertella. George Hudson discussed this species as a synonym of Borkhausenia apertella in his 1928 publication The butterflies and moths of New Zealand. In 1988 J. S. Dugdale reinstated this species and placed it in the genus Tingena. In doing so Dugdale pointed out that only the male lectotype and two female paralectotypes in Meyrick's series are T. oporaea. The others in Meyrick's series differ in their genitalia as well as their forewing colouration. The male lectotype is held at the Natural History Museum, London.

== Description ==
Meyrick originally described this species as follows:

Fore wings deep yellow, a blackish line on base of costa, sometimes three reddish fuscous discal dots; hind wings grey; thorax yellow.

Meyrick's more detailed observation, given in 1884, is as follows:

Male, female. — 18-20 mm. Head and thorax deep ochreous-yellow. Palpi ochreous-yellow, lower 2/3 of second joint externally suffused with dark fuscous. Antenna grey. Abdomen grey. Anterior legs dark fuscous; middle and posterior legs ochreous-whitish. Forewings moderate, costa moderately arched, apex rounded, hindmargin oblique, slightly rounded; deep yellow, sometimes suffused with reddish-ochreous towards middle of inner margin, anal angle, and apex; a short slender blackish streak along base of costa; sometimes a reddish-fuscous dot in disc before middle, a second beyond middle, and a third on fold directly beneath first, but these are usually quite obsolete, especially the first : cilia yellow, sometimes mixed with reddish-ochreous. Hindwings grey, darker posteriorly; cilia grey.

Meyrick states that this species can be distinguished from its similar appearing close relatives as it is larger, has a deeper yellow appearance to its forewings and has a yellow thorax.

== Distribution ==
This species is endemic to New Zealand and is found in Canterbury.

== Behaviour ==
The adults of this species are on the wing in January and February.

== Habitat and hosts ==
This species has been observed as being common amongst Nothofagus solandri. This species has also been collected in tussock grassland. The larvae of this species are leaf litter feeders.
