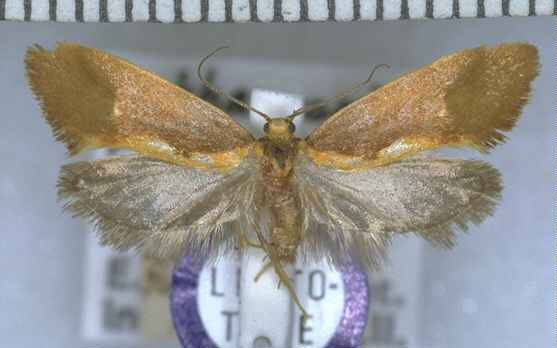
- Male lectotype

Scientific classification
- Kingdom: Animalia
- Phylum: Arthropoda
- Class: Insecta
- Order: Lepidoptera
- Family: Oecophoridae
- Genus: Tingena
- Species: T. phegophylla

Binomial name
- Tingena phegophylla (Meyrick, 1883)

Synonyms
- Oecophora phegophylla Meyrick, 1883; Borkhausenia phegophylla (Meyrick, 1883)

= Tingena phegophylla =

Species of moth, endemic to New Zealand

Tingena phegophylla is a species of moth in the family Oecophoridae. It is endemic to New Zealand and has been observed in the southern parts of the South Island. This species inhabits native beech forest. The adults of this species are on the wing in December.

== Taxonomy ==
This species was first described by Edward Meyrick in 1883 using specimens collected at Lake Wakatipu in December and named Oecophora phegophylla. Meyrick went on to give a more detailed description in 1884. In 1915 Meyrick placed this species within the Borkhausenia genus. In 1926 Alfred Philpott was unable to study the genitalia of the male of this species as no specimens were held in New Zealand collections however Dugdale points out that the genitalia of basella agrees with the genitalia of the lectotype of T. phegophylla. George Hudson discussed and illustrated this species under the name B. phegophylla in his 1928 publication The butterflies and moths of New Zealand. In 1988 Dugdale placed this species in the genus Tingena. The male lectotype is held at the Natural History Museum, London.

== Description ==
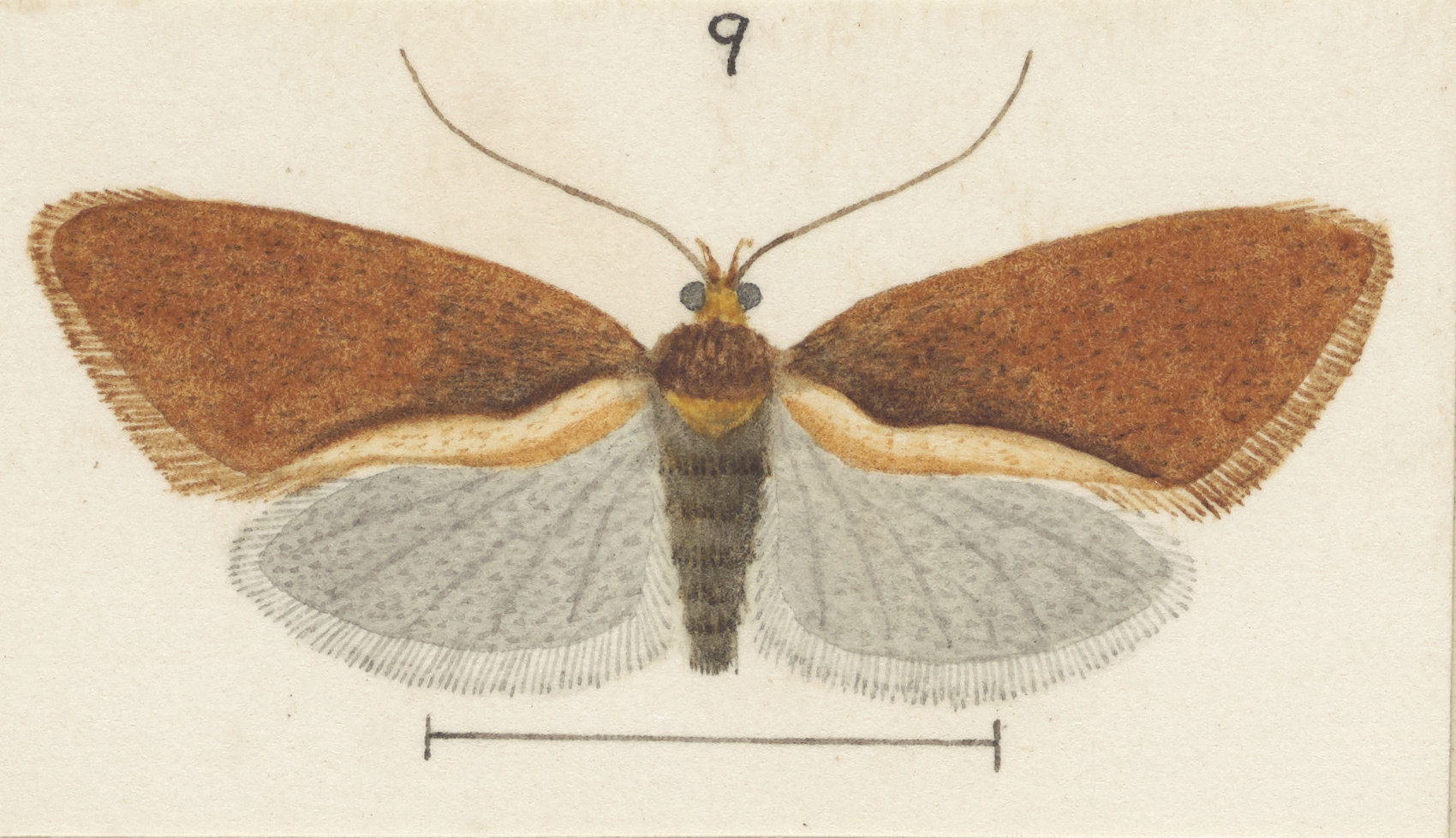
Illustration of T. phegophylla by George Hudson.

Meyrick first described this species as follows:

Fore wings dilated, reddish-ochreous-brown, a discal dot and indented dorsal streak ochreous-whitish, partly suffused with yellow; hind wings dark grey.

Meyrick's more detailed description is as follows:

Male.— 21-22 mm. Head ochreous-yellow. Palpi ochreous-yellow, externally mixed with dark fuscous. Antennae dark fuscous. Thorax ochreous-yellow, suffused with fuscous except on posterior margin. Abdomen grey. Legs dark fuscous, hairs of posterior tibiae and apex of all joints ochreous-yellow, beneath wholly ochreous-yellow. Forewings moderate, posteriorly strongly dilated, costa moderately arched, apex obtuse, hind-margin oblique, hardly rounded; reddish-ochreous-brown, becoming deeper towards inner margin; a minute ochreous-whitish dot in disc beyond middle; an ochreous-whitish streak along inner margin from base to 3/4, towards extremities suffused with bright ochreous-orange, its upper margin rather deeply indented at 1/3, thence somewhat dilated, and again attenuated to apex : cilia reddish-ochreous brown, beneath anal angle ochreous-whitish suffused with orange. Hindwings dark grey; cilia grey, extreme base pale.

The colouring of this species closely resembles a dead native beech leaf.

== Distribution ==
This species is endemic to New Zealand. It has been observed in the southern parts of the South Island including its type locality of Lake Wakatipu, at Leithen Bush, and in the Routeburn Valley.

== Behaviour ==
The adults of the species are on the wing in December.

== Habitat ==
This species has been observed inhabiting native beech forest and have been collected off Nothofagus solandri.
