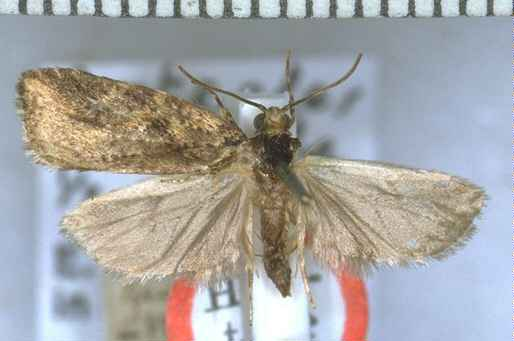
- Holotype

Scientific classification
- Kingdom: Animalia
- Phylum: Arthropoda
- Class: Insecta
- Order: Lepidoptera
- Family: Depressariidae
- Genus: Proteodes
- Species: P. profunda

Binomial name
- Proteodes profunda Meyrick, 1905

= Proteodes profunda =

Species of moth endemic to New Zealand

Proteodes profunda is a species of moth in the family Depressariidae. It is endemic to New Zealand. This species has been collected in its type locality of Mount Holdsworth in the Tararua Range, Raurimu near Tongariru National Park, at Days Bay in Wellington, at Mount Arthur, Otira, Invercargill, and in Southland. P. profunda lives in beech forests at altitudes of around 2000 ft and larvae feed on beech tree leaves. Adults of this species are on the wing from November to February.

== Taxonomy ==
This species was described by Edward Meyrick in 1905 using a male specimen collected by George Hudson at Mount Holdsworth in Wellington at 2000 ft. The holotype specimen is held at the Natural History Museum, London.

== Description ==
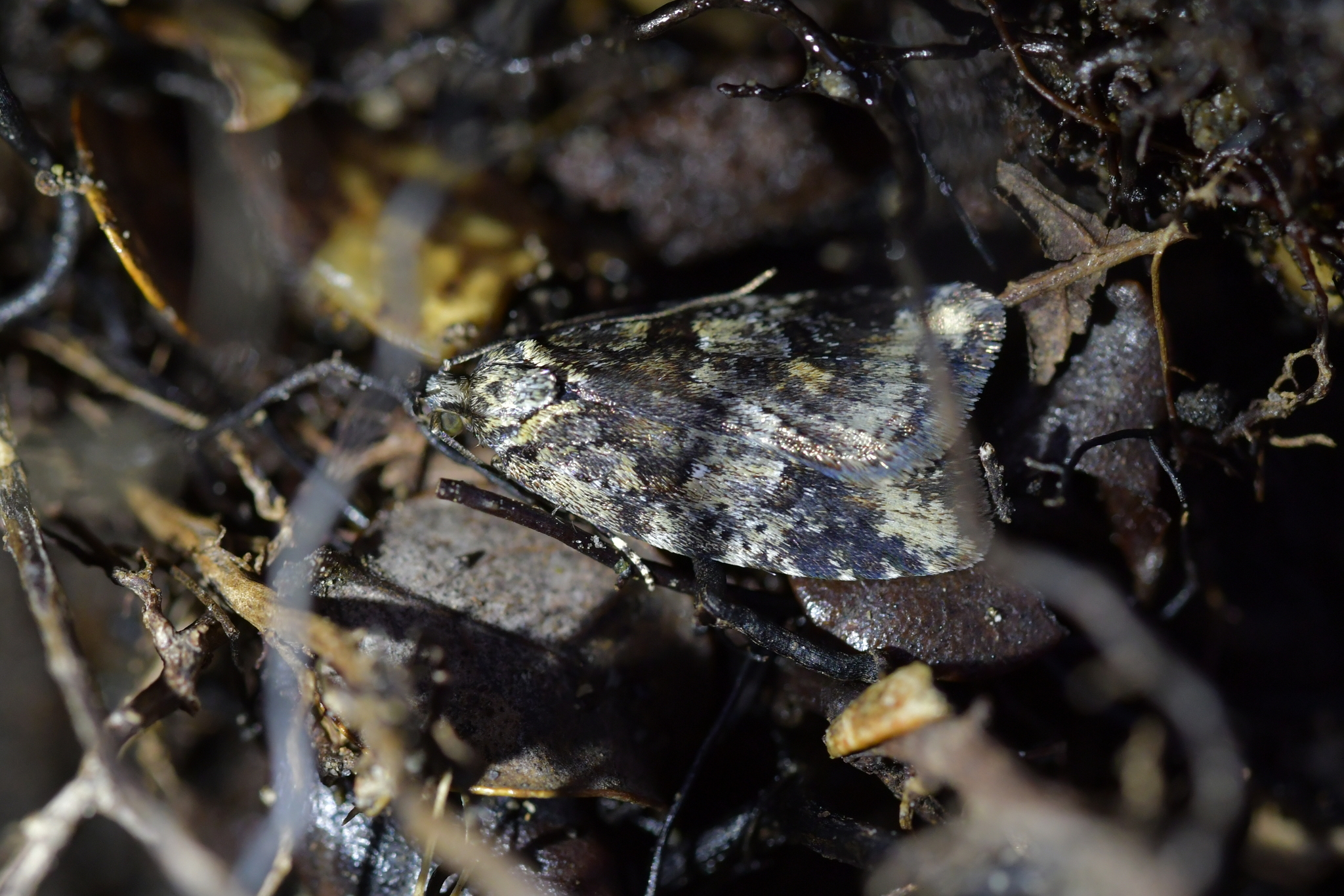
Proteodes profunda observed at Tongariru National Park.

Meyrick described the species as follows:

♂. 20 mm. Head ochreous, mixed on sides with dark fuscous. Palpi dark fuscous, extreme apex of second and terminal joints pale ochreous. Antennae, fuscous. Thorax dark fuscous, somewhat mixed partially with whitish-ochreous. Abdomen dark fuscous mixed with ochreous-whitish; at base a pair of oblique narrow bladder-like membranes above. Fore-wings broad, suboblong, rather dilated posteriorly, costa moderately arched, apex obtuse, termen faintly sinuate, little oblique, rounded beneath; fuscous, with series of cloudy dots of black irroration on veins; markings formed by whitish-ochreous suffusion, irregularly sprinkled with dark ferruginous; about six irregular subconfiuent spots towards base and anterior half of costa; a triangular subterminal patch extending from apex to tornus and leaving a narrow terminal streak of ground colour, its apex extending inwards to lower angle of cell; small discal spots of blackish suffusion before and beyond middle : cilia whitish-fuscous, basal half mixed with dark fuscous and whitish-ochreous, on costa with four pale dots. Hind-wings grey; cilia whitish-grey.

This species is superficially very similar in appearance to species in the Tortricidae family and mimics a dead beech leaf. Hudson regarded it as rare.

== Distribution ==
This species is endemic to New Zealand and has been collected in its type locality of Mount Holdsworth in the Tararua Range, Raurimu near Tongariru National Park, Days Bay in Wellington, Mount Arthur, Otira, Invercargill, and in Southland.

== Habitat and hosts ==
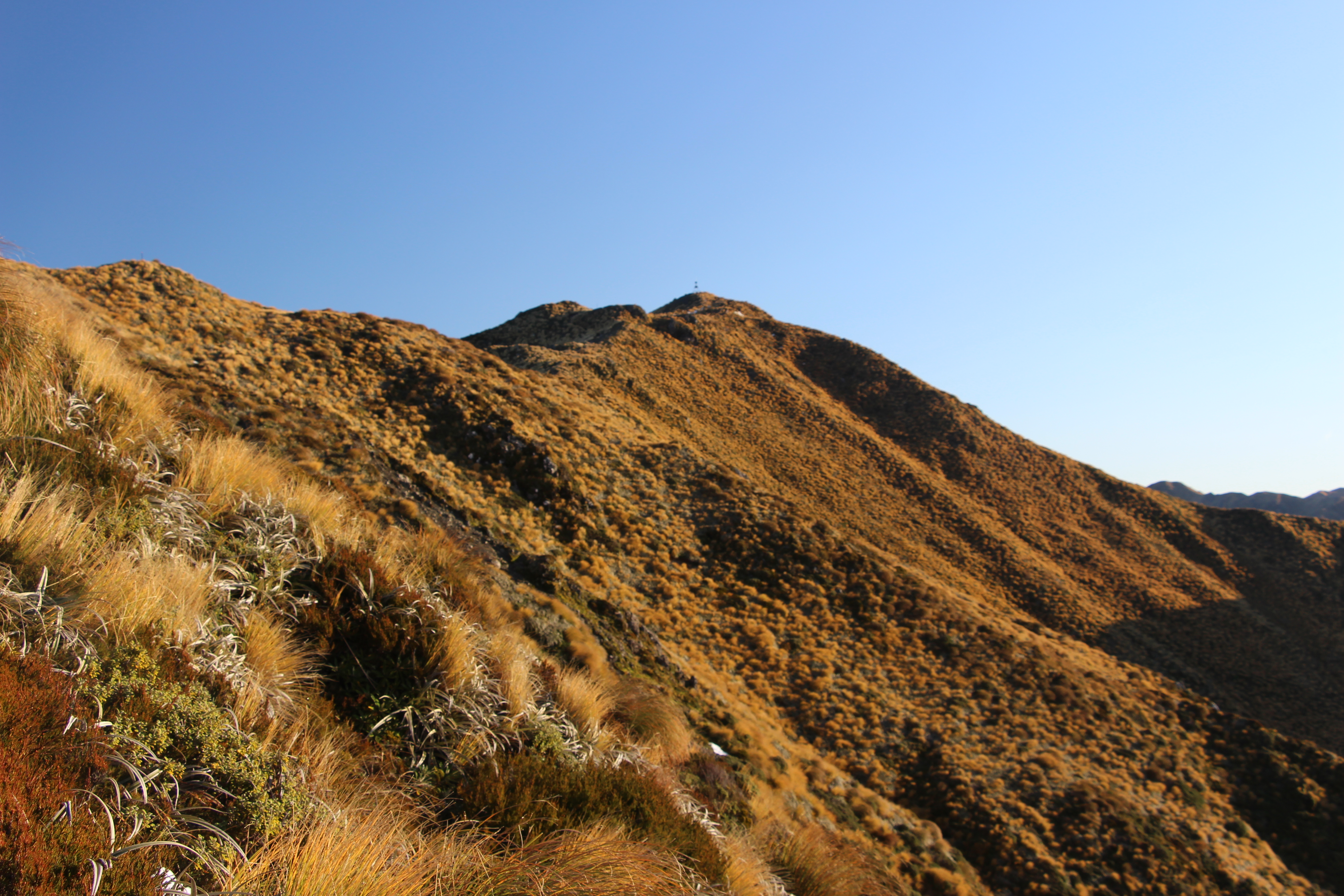
Mount Holdsworth, type locality of P. profunda

P. profunda lives in beech forests at altitudes of around 2000 ft. Larvae of this species feed on beech tree leaves.

== Behaviour ==
Adults of this species are on the wing from November to February.
