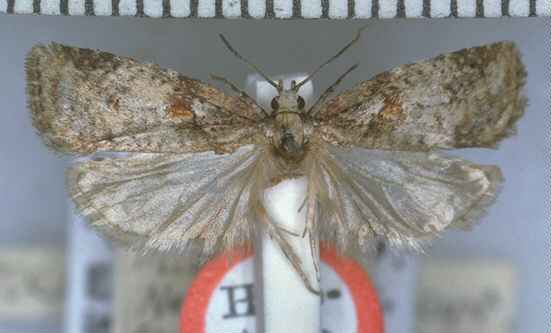
- Male holotype

Scientific classification
- Kingdom: Animalia
- Phylum: Arthropoda
- Class: Insecta
- Order: Lepidoptera
- Family: Depressariidae
- Genus: Proteodes
- Species: P. melographa

Binomial name
- Proteodes melographa Meyrick, 1927

Synonyms
- Proteodes varia Philpott, 1928

= Proteodes melographa =

Species of moth endemic to New Zealand

Proteodes melographa is a species of moth in the family Depressariidae. It is endemic to New Zealand and has been observed at Mount Arthur and in the Nelson District. It inhabits forest in the alpine zone. The larvae of this species feeds on native beech trees.

== Taxonomy ==
This species was first described by Edward Meyrick in 1927 using a specimen collected at Mount Arthur at 4000 ft in January by Selwyn Woodward. In 1936 Meyrick synonymised Proteodes varia with P. melographa. The male holotype specimen is held in the Natural History Museum, London.

== Description ==
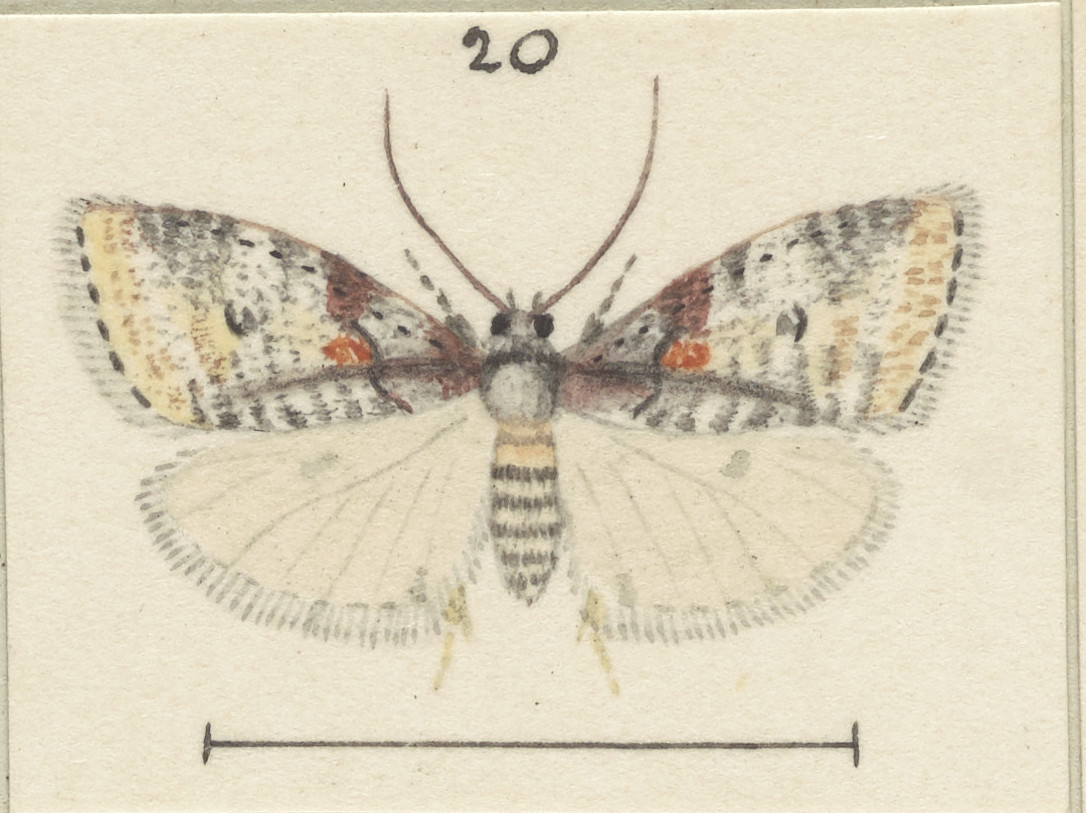
Illustration of P. melographa by George Hudson

Meyrick described this species as follows:

♂ 21 mm. Head white, a dark fuscous bar on face. Palpi white suffusedly mixed dark grey. Thorax white, patagia suffused dark grey except tips. Forewings moderate, posteriorly dilated, termen straight, rather oblique; white, irregularly sprinkled grey, unevenly strewn with blackish or dark brown dots, tending to form longitudinal or transverse series; some ferruginous suffusion towards base of costa; a small dark fuscous spot on costa at ⅓, whence a fine rather curved dark fuscous stria runs to dorsum, adjoining this posteriorly a suffused feruginous spot in disc and some grey marbling towards dorsum; a transverse brown-whitish mark on end of cell edged anteriorly with a few black scales, and posteriorly with dark grey suffusion, beyond this a transverse fascia, of grey marbling obscurely interrupted below middle, becoming darker and broader towards costa, on which it forms three or four small spots; some slight brownish suffusion near termen; a terminal series of blackish marks; cilia grey-whitish, base barred white, a dark grey subbasal and pale grey postmedian line. Hindwings whitish-grey; a light grey spot on end of cell; cilia whitish, basal half faintly barred greyish.

== Distribution ==
This species is endemic to New Zealand and is found in the Nelson/Tasman districts.

== Behaviour ==
This species is on the wing in January.

== Habitat and host species ==
The species can be found in alpine habitats at the limit of forest growth. The larvae of this moth feeds on native beech trees.
