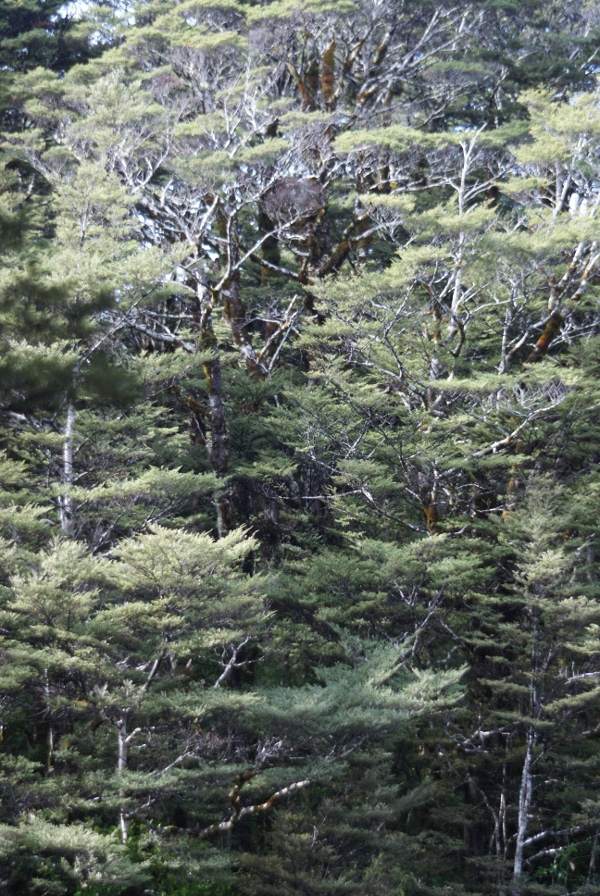
- Mountain beech trees

Conservation status
- Least Concern (IUCN 3.1)

Scientific classification
- Kingdom: Plantae
- Clade: Embryophytes
- Clade: Tracheophytes
- Clade: Spermatophytes
- Clade: Angiosperms
- Clade: Eudicots
- Clade: Rosids
- Order: Fagales
- Family: Nothofagaceae
- Genus: Nothofagus
- Subgenus: Nothofagus subg. Fuscospora
- Species: N. cliffortioides

Binomial name
- Nothofagus cliffortioides (Hook.f.) Oerst.

Synonyms
- Fagus cliffortioides Hook.f. (1844); Fuscospora cliffortioides (Hook.f.) Heenan & Smissen (2013); Nothofagus solandri var. cliffortioides (Hook.f.) Poole (1963)

= Nothofagus cliffortioides =

Species of southern beech tree in New Zealand

Nothofagus cliffortioides, commonly called mountain beech (Māori: tawhai rauriki), is a species of southern beech tree and is endemic to New Zealand. Mountain beech grows in mountainous regions at high elevations. In New Zealand the taxon is called Fuscospora cliffortioides. Nothofagus cliffortioides occupies a wider range of habitat than any other New Zealand tree species and it shows a corresponding range of life form, seeding habits, regenerative patterns, growth habits, growth rates, stand replacement and mortality patterns.

Mountain beech grows to around 20 metres (66 ft) but near the treeline forms a "goblin forest" where the trees are no more than 2 m (6 ft 7 in) tall. It also has leaves that are elongated and have a pointed end.

== Ecology ==
Mountain beech is eaten by the mountain beech flat moth (Proteodes carnifex), and is a host plant for the lichens Yarrumia colensoi and Podostictina degelii, and the fungi Annulohypoxylon bovei and Rossbeevera pachydermis.

== Hybrids ==
- Mountain beech is known to hybridise with black beech (Nothofagus solandri) where the two species co-exist, and in some places the hybrids may form complex introgressive hybrid swarms.
- Mountain beech also hybridises with red beech (Nothofagus fusca) to form the hybrid species Nothofagus × blairii.
