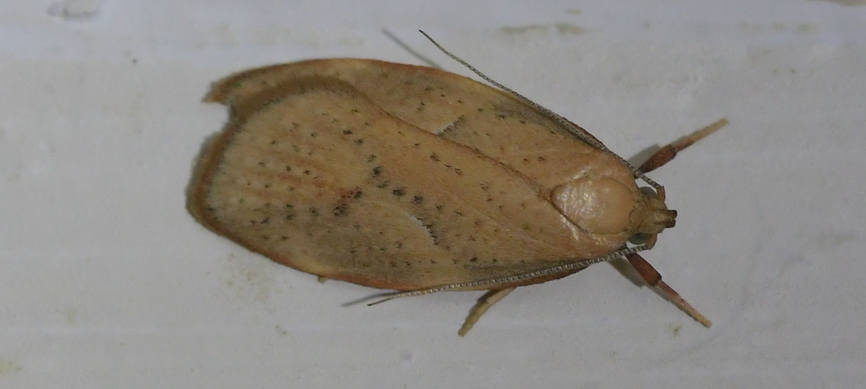
- Proteodes carnifex

Scientific classification
- Kingdom: Animalia
- Phylum: Arthropoda
- Class: Insecta
- Order: Lepidoptera
- Family: Depressariidae
- Genus: Proteodes; Meyrick, 1883

= Proteodes =

Genus of moths

Proteodes is a genus of moths in the family Depressariidae. It was first described by Edward Meyrick in 1883. This genus is endemic to New Zealand.

== Species ==
Species in this genus are:

- Proteodes carnifex (Butler, 1877)
- Proteodes clarkei Philpott, 1926
- Proteodes melographa Meyrick, 1927
- Proteodes profunda Meyrick, 1905
- Proteodes smithi Howes, 1946
