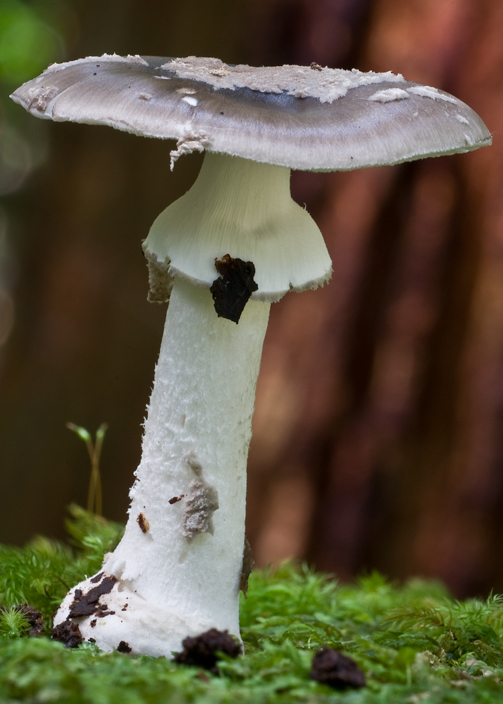

Scientific classification
- Kingdom: Fungi
- Division: Basidiomycota
- Class: Agaricomycetes
- Order: Agaricales
- Family: Amanitaceae
- Genus: Amanita
- Species: A. luteofusca

Binomial name
- Amanita luteofusca Cleland & E.-J. Gilbert 1941

= Amanita luteofusca =

Species of fungus

Amanita luteofusca is a species of Amanita from South Australia.
