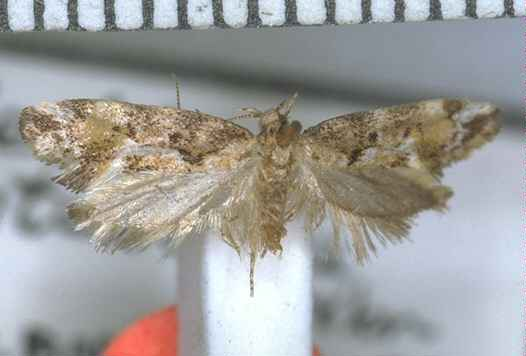
- Male lectotype

Scientific classification
- Kingdom: Animalia
- Phylum: Arthropoda
- Class: Insecta
- Order: Lepidoptera
- Family: Oecophoridae
- Genus: Tingena
- Species: T. contextella

Binomial name
- Tingena contextella (Walker, 1864)

Synonyms
- Gelechia contextella Walker, 1864; Borkhausenia contextella (Walker, 1864)

= Tingena contextella =

Species of moth, endemic to New Zealand

Tingena contextella is a species of moth in the family Oecophoridae. It is endemic to New Zealand and has found in the North and South Islands. The larvae of this species feed on leaf litter.

== Taxonomy ==
This species was first described by Frances Walker in 1864 using specimen collected by T. R. Oxley in Nelson. In 1915 Meyrick placed this species within the Borkhausenia genus and synonymised it with Borkhausenia plagiatella. George Hudson discussed this species as a synonym of B. plagiatella in his 1928 publication The butterflies and moths of New Zealand. In 1988 J. S. Dugdale removed this species from this synonymy and placed this species in the genus Tingena. The male lectotype is held at the Natural History Museum, London.

== Description ==
Walker described this species as follows:

Male. Cinereous, shining and with an aeneous tinge beneath. Palpi much longer than the breadth of the head; second joint black towards the base; third lanceolate, much shorter than the second. Antennae smooth, slender, much shorter than the fore wings. Wings moderately broad, rounded at the tips; fringe moderately long. Fore wings partly tinged with aeneous, irregularly speckled with black scales, which also form an oblique mark hindward before the middle, a dot in the middle of the disk, a smaller mark on the interior border, and two transverse undulating submarginal lines, which are dilated towards the costa; exterior border very oblique. Hind wings shining, with a slight aeneous tinge. Length of the body 3 lines; of the wings 8 lines.

== Distribution ==
This species is endemic to New Zealand and has been observed in not just the type locality of Nelson but also in the Wellington region.

== Behaviour ==
The larvae of this species feed on leaf litter.
