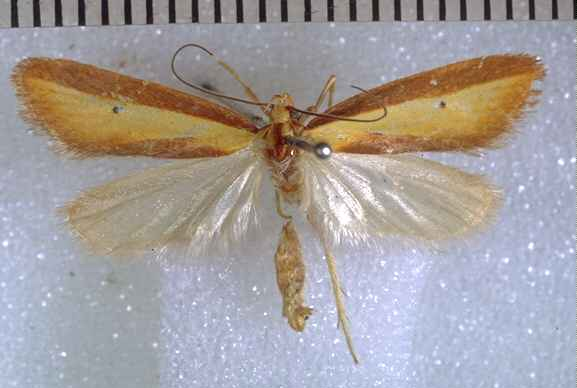
- Male

Scientific classification
- Kingdom: Animalia
- Phylum: Arthropoda
- Class: Insecta
- Order: Lepidoptera
- Family: Depressariidae
- Genus: Proteodes
- Species: P. clarkei

Binomial name
- Proteodes clarkei Philpott, 1926

= Proteodes clarkei =

Species of moth endemic to New Zealand

Proteodes clarkei is a species of moth in the family Depressariidae. It is endemic to New Zealand and has been collected in locations around Manapouri in alpine habitats. Both the male and female adults of the species are brightly coloured but the female is brachypterous, that is it has reduced wing size in comparison to the male. Adults have been recorded as being on the wing in January and February.

== Taxonomy ==
This species was first described by Alfred Philpott in 1926 using specimens collected by Charles Clarke and Stewart Lindsay in January in the Hunter Mountains at an altitude of around 4,000 ft (1,200 m). Philpott named the species after Clarke. The male holotype is held at the Canterbury Museum.

== Description ==
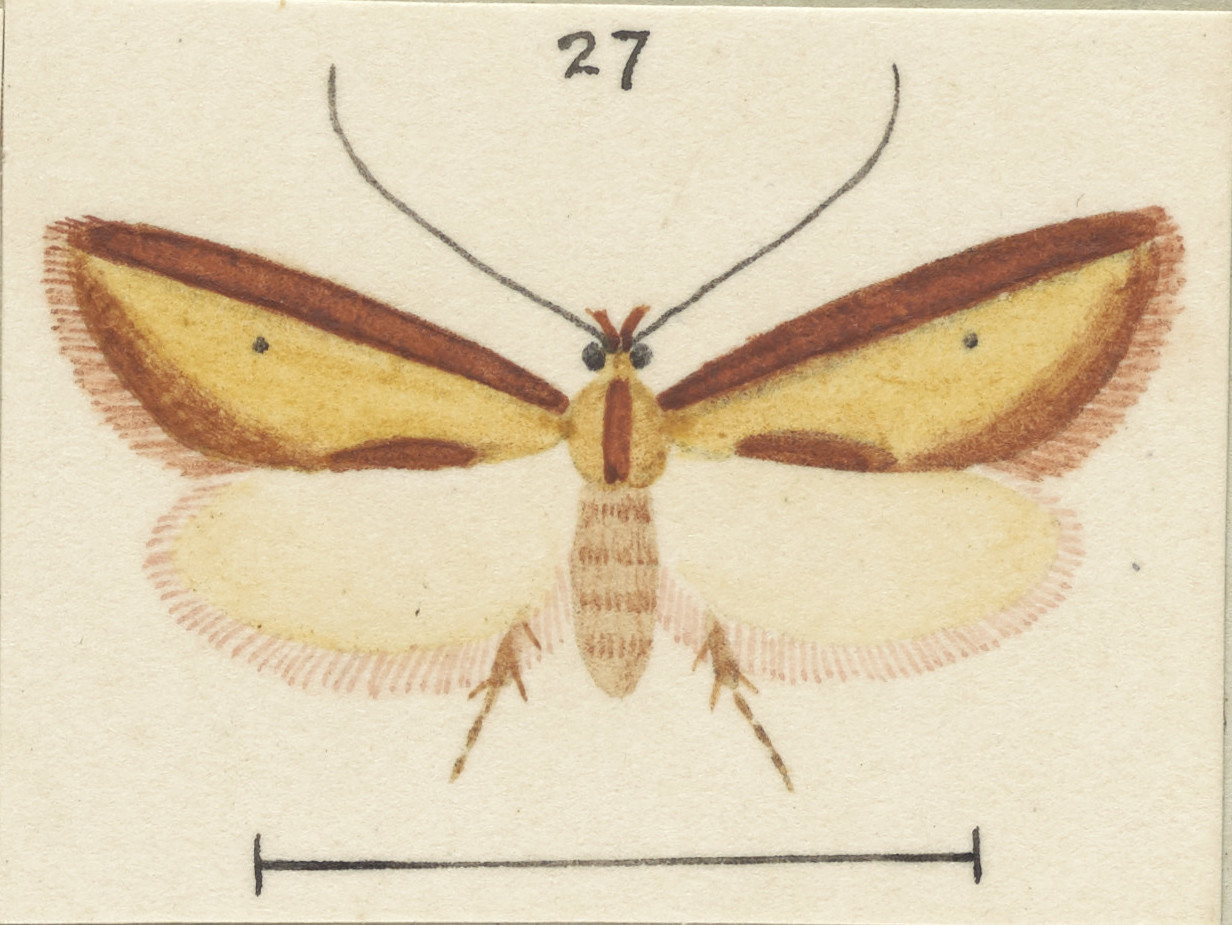
Illustration of male P. clarkei by George Hudson

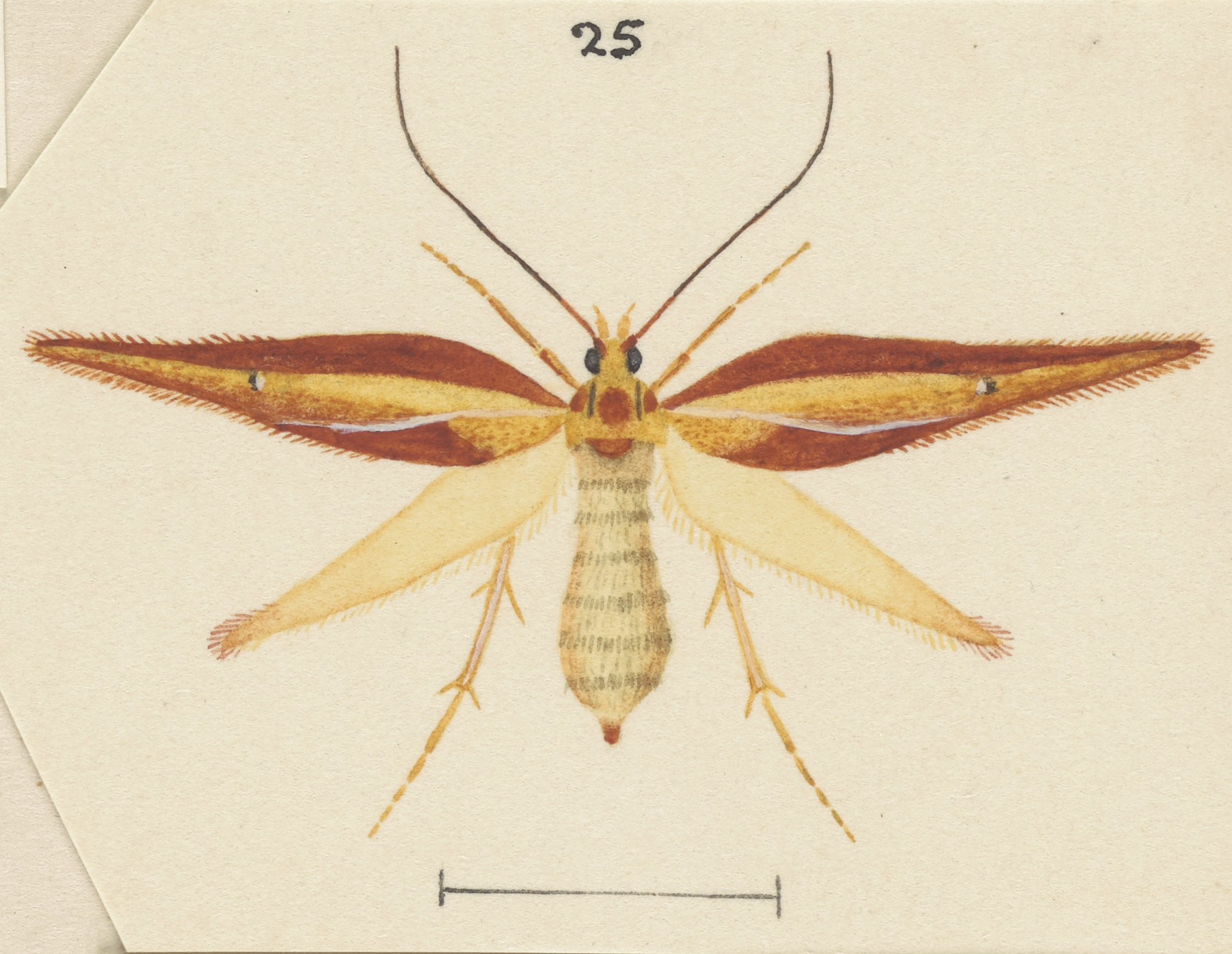
Illustration of female P. clarkei by George Hudson

Philpott described the male of the species as follows:

♂. 24 mm. Head light yellow. Palpi—second segment ferruginous except at apex which is yellow, terminal segment yellow. Antennae fuscous, closely annulated with darker, basal segment ferruginous, ciliations almost 1. Thorax yellow, tegulae and a broad median stripe ferruginous. Abdomen ochreous-white, Legs ochreous-white, anterior pair mixed with ferruginous. Forewings elongate-trianglar [sic], costa moderately arched, apex rounded, termen slightly rounded, oblique; ferruginous; a broad stripe of yellow occupying median portion of wing, sharply separated in a straight line from costal ferruginous area, and suffusedly margined with ferruginous along dorsum and termen; a prominent blackish-ferruginous dot in disc at 2/3, broadly margined anteriorly with metallic white: fringes ferruginous. Hindwings shining white tinged with ochreous: fringes pink.

He went on to describe the female as follows:

The sex is semiapterous. The forewings, which are of about normal length, are broadly lanceolate and the hindwings sabre-shaped. The colouring is as in the male.

The female of the species is brachypterous.

== Distribution ==
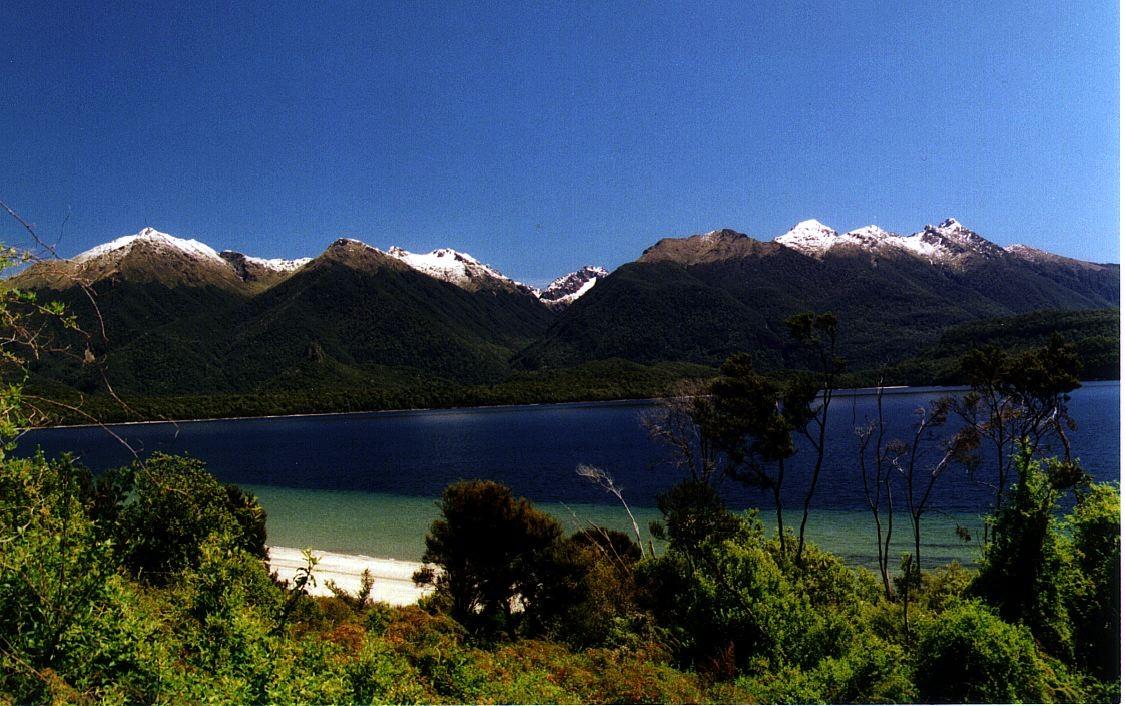
Hunters Mountains, type locality of species

This species is endemic to New Zealand. It has been collected at its type locality of the Hunter Mountains in Fiordland, including Mt Titiroa in early February. The Hunter Mountains are near Manapouri.

== Behaviour ==
Adults of this species is on the wing in January and February.

== Habitat ==
This species can be found in a rare ecosystem - granite sand plains in the alpine zone of the South Island.
