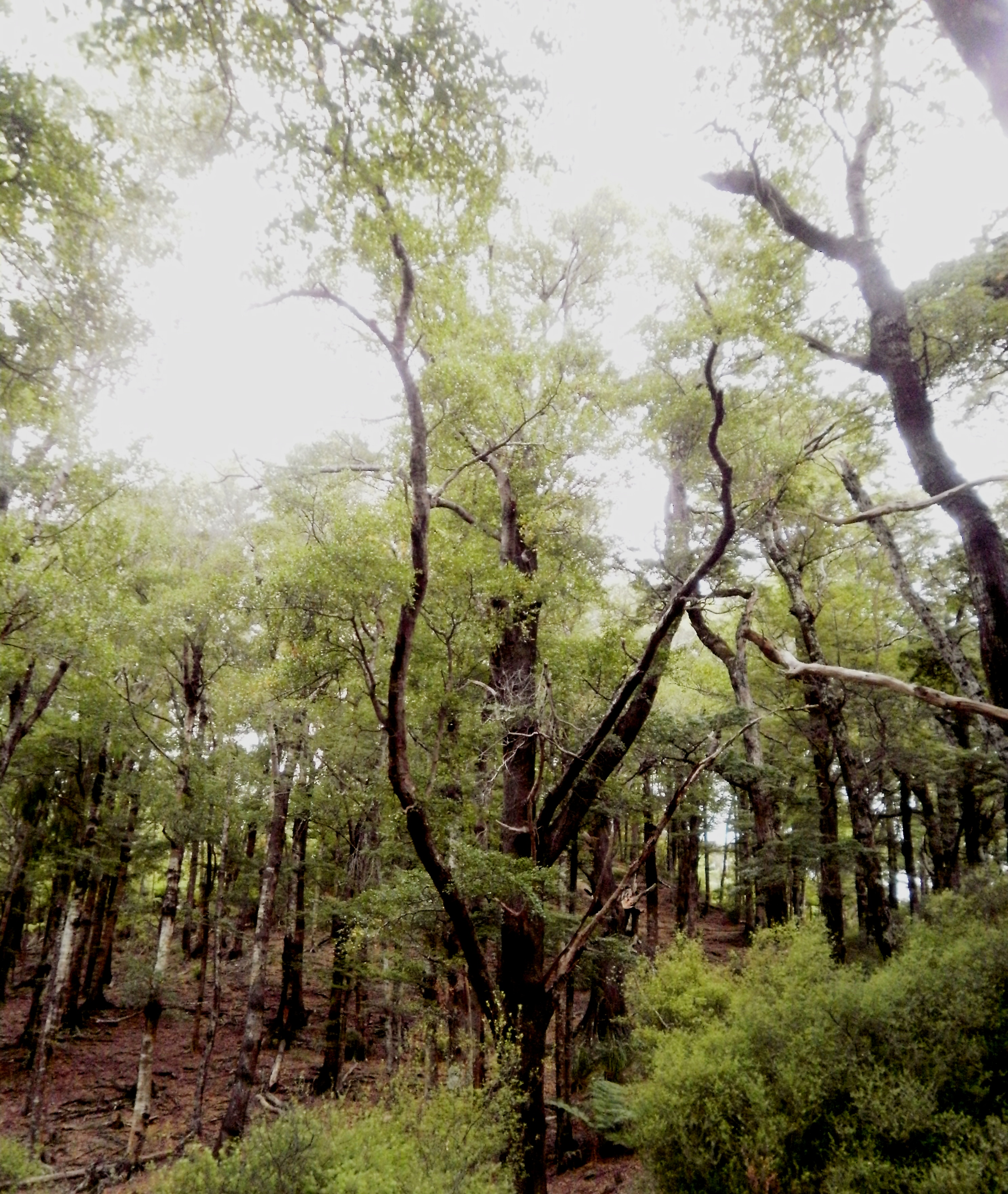

Conservation status
- Least Concern (IUCN 3.1)

Scientific classification
- Kingdom: Plantae
- Clade: Embryophytes
- Clade: Tracheophytes
- Clade: Spermatophytes
- Clade: Angiosperms
- Clade: Eudicots
- Clade: Rosids
- Order: Fagales
- Family: Nothofagaceae
- Genus: Nothofagus
- Subgenus: Nothofagus subg. Fuscospora
- Species: N. truncata

Binomial name
- Nothofagus truncata (Colenso) Cockayne

Synonyms
- Fuscospora truncata (Colenso) Heenan & Smissen; Fagus truncata

= Nothofagus truncata =

Species of tree

Nothofagus truncata, or hard beech (Māori: tawhairaunui), is a species of tree endemic to New Zealand. Its common name derives from the fact that the timber has a high silica content, making it tough and difficult to saw. Hard beech is a tree up to 30m tall occurring in lowland and lower montane forest from latitude 35°S to 42°30'S, that is, from the north of the North Island southwards to Marlborough and south Westland in the South Island. In Taranaki it forms almost pure stands on the rugged sandstone country there and is partially deciduous, dropping many of its leaves at the end of the winter. N. truncata became known as Fuscospora truncata after 2013 in New Zealand.

== Ecology ==
The understorey of forests populated by N. truncata may contain a variety of ferns and other understory vegetation; characteristic understory elements may include crown fern and drooping spleenwort.

== Morphology ==
The coriaceous, hairless broadly ovate leaves range from 2.5 to 4 cm (1.0 to 1.6 in) long, and have from eight to twelve pairs of coarse, blunt teeth. The slate to dark grey bark is thick and furrowed. The tiny red male flowers are bell-shaped and produced in large numbers while the female flowers, which are green tipped with brown, are in groups of three on short stalks growing in the axils of the leaves.

== Uses ==
The bark of Nothofagus truncata has a high tannin content and has traditionally been used for tanning leather. The timber is red when freshly cut but turns pale brown as it dries. It has been used for bridge building and for making poles, fencing posts and railway sleepers. The wood has a fine straight grain and even texture and is used for joinery, flooring, decking and cabinet making.

== Hybrids ==
- Hard beech hybridises with black beech (Nothofagus solandri) to form the hybrid species Nothofagus × apiculata.

== Sources ==
- Dawson, John; Lucas, Rob (2000). Nature Guide to the New Zealand Forest. Godwit. ISBN 1-86962-055-0.
- Flora of New Zealand. 2007. Nothofagus truncata. Accessed 2010-10-04.
- C. Michael Hogan. 2009. Crown Fern: Blechnum discolor, Globaltwitcher.com, ed. N. Stromberg
- New Zealand Plant Conservation Network, URL: Nothofagus truncata. Accessed 2010-10-04.
- Media related to Nothofagus truncata at Wikimedia Commons
- Data related to Nothofagus truncata at Wikispecies
