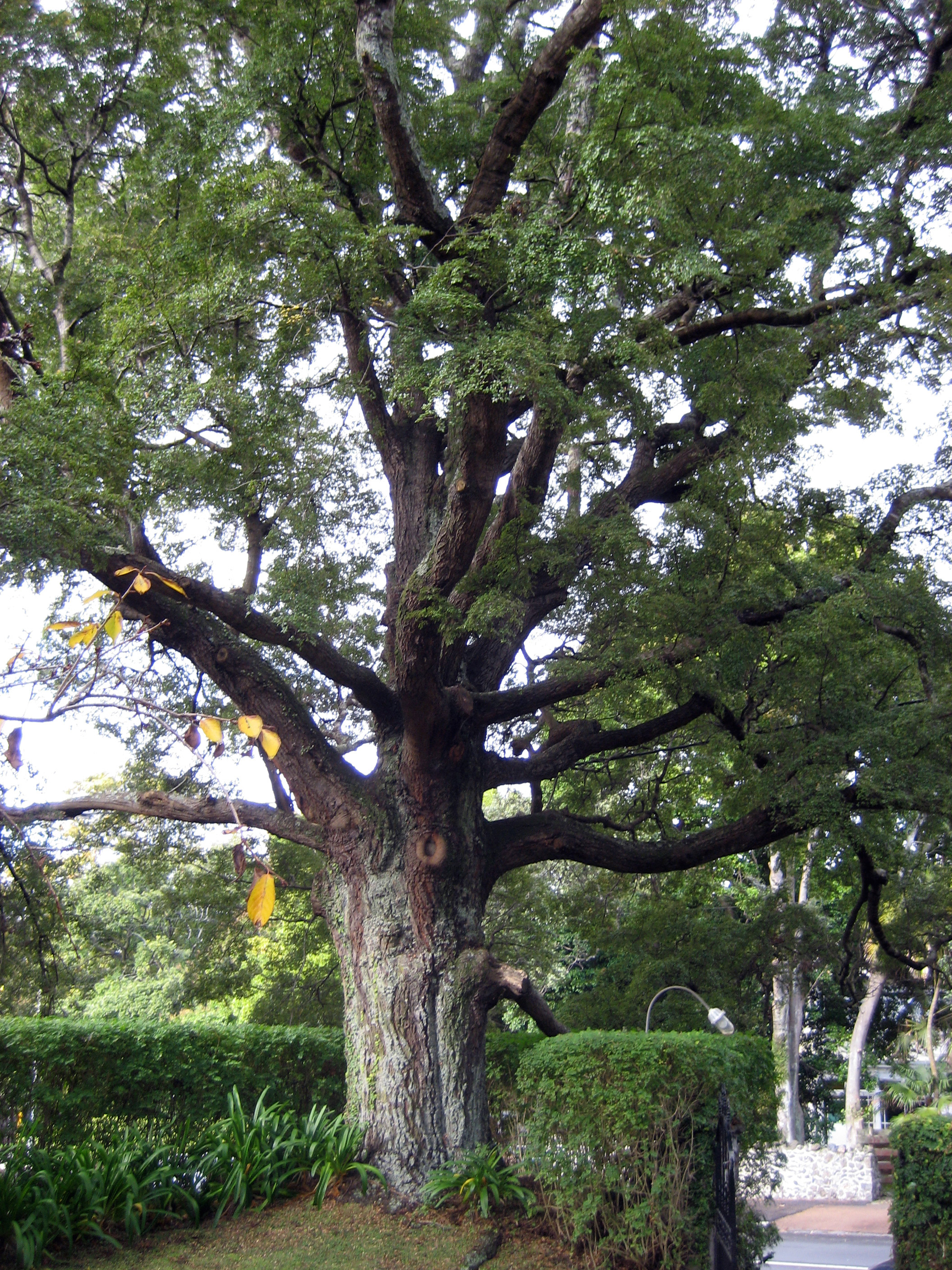

Conservation status
- Least Concern (IUCN 3.1)

Scientific classification
- Kingdom: Plantae
- Clade: Embryophytes
- Clade: Tracheophytes
- Clade: Spermatophytes
- Clade: Angiosperms
- Clade: Eudicots
- Clade: Rosids
- Order: Fagales
- Family: Nothofagaceae
- Genus: Nothofagus
- Subgenus: Nothofagus subg. Fuscospora
- Species: N. solandri

Binomial name
- Nothofagus solandri (Hook.f.) Oerst.

Synonyms
- Fagus solandri Hook.f. (1844); Fuscospora solandri (Hook.f.) Heenan & Smissen (2013); Cliffortioides oblongata Dryand. (1844); Myrtilloides cinerascens Banks & Sol. ex Hook. (1844); Nothofagus × soltruncata Cockayne (1928)

= Nothofagus solandri =

Species of plant

Nothofagus solandri, commonly known as black beech (Māori: tawai rauriki), is species of tree endemic to New Zealand. Black beech occurs on both the North and the South Island at low elevations up to the mountains. It is also known as Nothofagus solandri var. solandri. In New Zealand the taxon is often called Fuscospora solandri.

Black beech is a medium-sized evergreen tree growing to 27 m (89 ft) tall. The leaves are oppositely arranged, ovoid, 10 mm long and 5 mm broad, with smooth margins.

Black beech is known as black beech because it is prone to a sooty mold which covers the trunk and branches. This, in turn, is the result of a scale insect which sucks sap from the tree, and excretes honeydew, a sweet liquid, in small droplets (less than 1 mm diameter) on the end of stalks. This feeds the sooty mold, and also forms a valuable high-energy food source for various birds and insects including the kākā. The infestation is common and does not appear to harm the tree.

The Māori language name tawai rauriki or tawhai rauriki is also used for mountain beech (Nothofagus cliffortioides).

Black beech and mountain beech have both been planted in Great Britain, and mountain beech has shown better cold tolerance than black beech in locations such as Scotland.

== Hybrids ==
- Black beech is known to hybridise freely with mountain beech (Nothofagus cliffortioides) where the two species co-exist. Mountain beech generally grows at higher elevations than black beech. In some places the hybrids may form complex introgressive hybrid swarms.
- Black beech hybridises with hard beech (Nothofagus truncata) to form the hybrid species Nothofagus × apiculata.
- Black beech hybridises with red beech (Nothofagus fusca) to form the hybrid species Nothofagus × dubia.
