= Nothofagus stylosa =

Conservation status
- Critically Endangered (IUCN 3.1)

Scientific classification
- Kingdom: Plantae
- Clade: Embryophytes
- Clade: Tracheophytes
- Clade: Spermatophytes
- Clade: Angiosperms
- Clade: Eudicots
- Clade: Rosids
- Order: Fagales
- Family: Nothofagaceae
- Genus: Nothofagus
- Subgenus: Nothofagus subg. Brassospora
- Species: N. stylosa

Binomial name
- Nothofagus stylosa Steenis (1986)

Synonyms
- Trisyngyne stylosa (Steenis) Heenan & Smissen (2013)

Species of flowering plant

Nothofagus stylosa is a species of plant in the family Nothofagaceae. It is endemic to West Papua (Indonesia). It is a Critically Endangered species threatened by habitat loss.

Nothofagus stylosa is known from a single population on the northern slope of the Central Range of Western New Guinea at approximately 1,200 meters elevation. It has an estimated area of occupancy (AOO) of 4 km^{2}. It grows in lower montane forest among other, more widespread, species of Nothofagus, including Nothofagus carrii and Nothofagus flaviramea.

Nothofagus forests in the area are exploited for timber, and the species is threatened by logging, fire, and conversion of forest to agriculture and other uses. It is assessed as critically endangered.

It was proposed to be renamed Trisyngyne stylosa in 2013.
