= Nothofagus aequilateralis =

Conservation status
- Near Threatened (IUCN 3.1)

Scientific classification
- Kingdom: Plantae
- Clade: Embryophytes
- Clade: Tracheophytes
- Clade: Spermatophytes
- Clade: Angiosperms
- Clade: Eudicots
- Clade: Rosids
- Order: Fagales
- Family: Nothofagaceae
- Genus: Nothofagus
- Subgenus: Nothofagus subg. Brassospora
- Species: N. aequilateralis

Binomial name
- Nothofagus aequilateralis (Baum.-Bod.) Steenis (1954)

Synonyms
- Trisyngyne aequilateralis Baum.-Bod. (1953)

Species of flowering plant

Nothofagus aequilateralis is a species of tree in the family Nothofagaceae. It is endemic to New Caledonia. It grows in the southern end of the island from 160 to 1,150 meters elevation, often on ridge tops.
