= Nothofagus starkenborghiorum =

Conservation status
- Least Concern (IUCN 3.1)

Scientific classification
- Kingdom: Plantae
- Clade: Embryophytes
- Clade: Tracheophytes
- Clade: Spermatophytes
- Clade: Angiosperms
- Clade: Eudicots
- Clade: Rosids
- Order: Fagales
- Family: Nothofagaceae
- Genus: Nothofagus
- Subgenus: Nothofagus subg. Brassospora
- Species: N. starkenborghiorum

Binomial name
- Nothofagus starkenborghiorum Steenis (1952)

Synonyms
- Trisyngyne starkenborghiorum (Steenis) Heenan & Smissen (2013)

Species of flowering plant

Nothofagus starkenborghiorum is a species of tree in the family Nothofagaceae. It is native to New Guinea and New Britain. It grows in montane rain forests, and occasionally in lowland rain forests.

== Description ==
Nothofagus starkenborghiorum is a monoecious tree, which grows to over 30 meters tall, with a trunk that can exceed 1 meter in diameter. Young leaves are bright reddish-brown. It fruits and flowers in October and November.

== Range and habitat ==
Nothofagus starkenborghiorum has a wide distribution across the highlands of New Guinea, extending from the Vogelkop Peninsula in the west across the Central Range to the Papuan Peninsula in the southeast. It is also found in the montane forests of New Britain's highlands. It generally grows in lower montane forest above 1000 meters elevation, but is sometimes found at lower elevations – as low as 610 meters on New Britain, and 700–800 m at Lake Kutubu in Southern Highlands Province of Papua New Guinea.

In lower montane forests it often grows on ridges and on limestone soils. It is typically the dominant canopy tree, or forms monodominant stands in mixed montane forests, and less often grows in mixed species forests. Nothofagus resinosa has a similar distribution to N. starkenborghiorum, and the two species are often found in association. Nothofagus forest is generally found above a lower montane belt of oak relatives Castanopsis and Lithocarpus (family Fagaceae). The transition between the fagaceous forests and Nothofagus forests is often abrupt, and less often the forest types intergrade or intersperse. N. starkenborghiorum can form large monotypic stands, including a 60,000 hectare stand on the limestone Nakanai Plateau of New Britain.

On New Guinea Nothofagus forest usually has an understory of smaller trees, shrubs, lianas, and herbaceous plants. On New Britain N. starkenborghiorum stands often have a sparse understory composed mostly of ferns.

Nothofagus forest usually extends up to 3000 meters, where it transitions to upper montane forest typically dominated by conifers. N. starkenborghiorum grows with N. brassii in montane forest around Lake Habbema in the Jayawijaya Range of Western New Guinea from about 2000 to 3000 meters elevation, and in mossy forest from approximately 3,000 to 3,500 meters elevation. It is less common than N. brassii in mossy forest.

== Uses ==
The tree is used for timber. It has rose-colored outer wood and brown inner wood. It is known by the Indonesian vernacular name sagé merah, with sagé as the local name for the tree and merah meaning red. It is used by local people for houses and fences, and logged commercially. Since the 2000s it has been the target of massive illegal logging in parts of its range.

The Dani people of the Baliem Valley in western New Guinea use the leaves and bark of N. starkenborghiorum and N. brassii (both known locally as sagé) to treat many chronic illnesses with symptoms resembling cancer and degenerative diseases.

Nothofagus starkenborghiorum may contain Nothofagin, a chemical constituent also found in N. fusca from New Zealand. Nothofagin is a dihydrochalcone, a phenolic antioxidant and C-linked phloretin glucoside, which may account for its efficacy in traditional medicine.
