= Nothofagus discoidea =

Conservation status
- Endangered (IUCN 3.1)

Scientific classification
- Kingdom: Plantae
- Clade: Embryophytes
- Clade: Tracheophytes
- Clade: Spermatophytes
- Clade: Angiosperms
- Clade: Eudicots
- Clade: Rosids
- Order: Fagales
- Family: Nothofagaceae
- Genus: Nothofagus
- Subgenus: Nothofagus subg. Brassospora
- Species: N. discoidea

Binomial name
- Nothofagus discoidea (Baum.-Bod.) Steenis (1954)

Synonyms
- Trisyngyne discoidea Baum.-Bod. (1953)

Species of flowering plant

Nothofagus discoidea is a species of plant in the family Nothofagaceae. It is endemic to New Caledonia.
