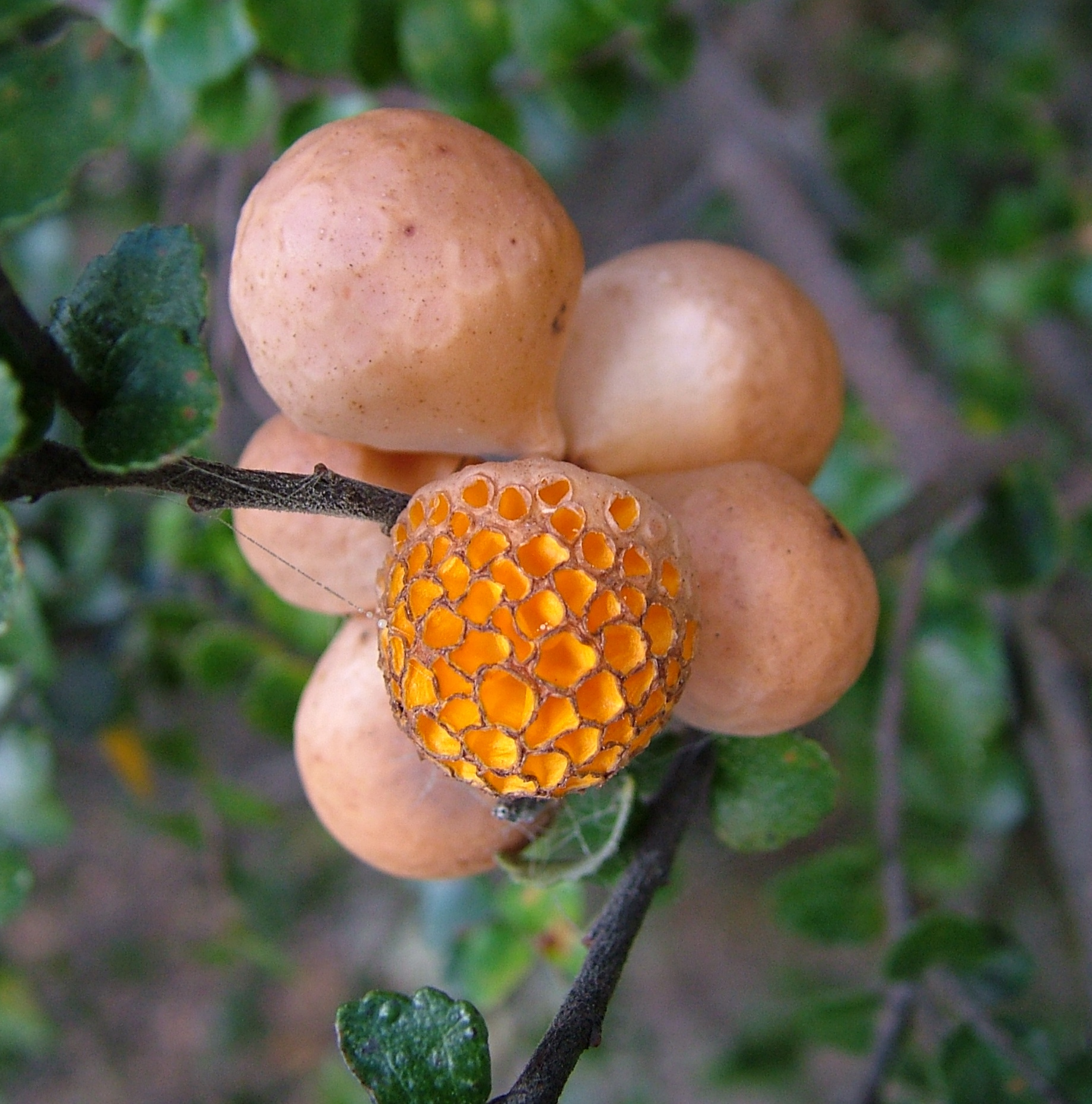
- at Cradle Mtn NP

Scientific classification
- Domain: Eukaryota
- Kingdom: Fungi
- Division: Ascomycota
- Class: Leotiomycetes
- Order: Cyttariales
- Family: Cyttariaceae
- Genus: Cyttaria
- Species: C. gunnii

Binomial name
- Cyttaria gunnii Berk. (1845)

= Cyttaria gunnii =

Species of fungus

Cyttaria gunnii, commonly known as the myrtle orange or beech orange, is an orange-white coloured and edible ascomycete fungus native to Australia. It is a specific parasite of myrtle beech (Nothofagus cunninghamii) trees.

== History ==
English botanist Miles Joseph Berkeley described the beech orange in 1848. In 1886, a New Zealand fungus similar to the beech orange was described as Cyttaria purdiei; later, however, the two species were assumed to be the same. A molecular study has now found the Australian and New Zealand fungi known as C. gunnii to be two distinct species. New Zealand populations are restricted to Nothofagus menziesii while the Australian ones are only found on Nothofagus cunninghamii and are hence found in southern Victoria and Tasmania.

The 1889 book 'The Useful Native Plants of Australia records that "This edible fungus is found on the branches of Fagus Cunnittghamii or native Beech. Tasmania."

The evolution of the genus parallels that of the host genus Nothofagus; hence C. septentrionalis, the closest relative, parasitises Antarctic beech (Nothofagus moorei), the closest relative of myrtle beech. Ancestors of the two species are thought to have diverged from the South American and New Zealand Cyttaria species between 28 and 44 million years ago.

== Appearance and uses ==
The fungi form globose woody galls on their host trees, though they do not appear to spread through them. They are perennial and produce crops of fruit bodies annually. Said to resemble bunches of grapes, the fruit bodies appear in clusters in late spring and summer (November to January). Globular or pear-shaped, these can reach 2.5 cm (1 in) in diameter. They are covered by a membrane that bursts, uncovering a network of concavities. The spore print is black and the spores measure 12 by 7–12 μm. Aboriginal Australians have used the fruit bodies as food. The fruits have a consistency akin to jelly and are reportedly pleasant-tasting.
