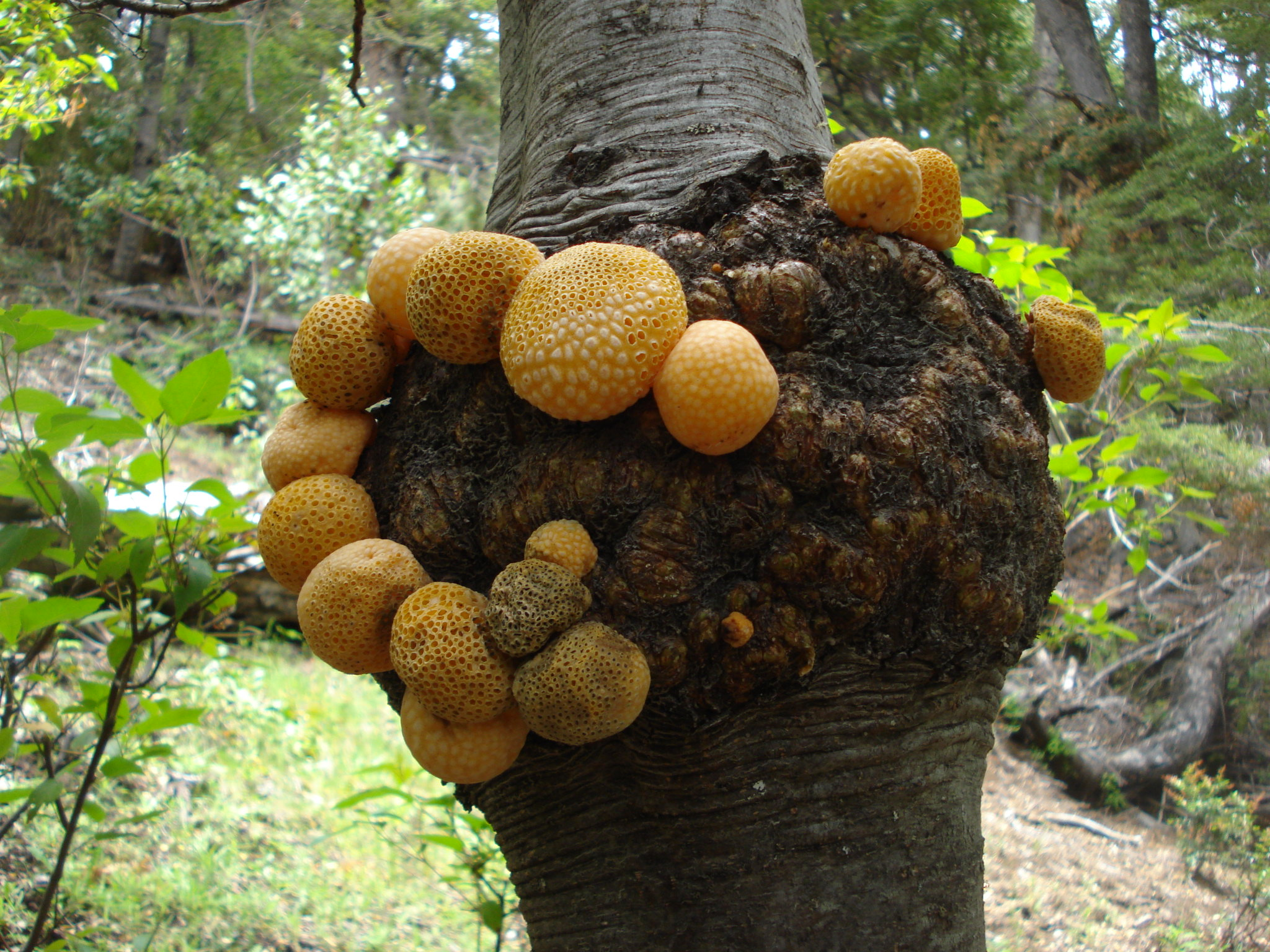
- Cyttaria hariotii fruiting bodies

Scientific classification
- Domain: Eukaryota
- Kingdom: Fungi
- Division: Ascomycota
- Class: Leotiomycetes
- Order: Cyttariales
- Family: Cyttariaceae
- Genus: Cyttaria
- Species: C. hariotii

Binomial name
- Cyttaria hariotii E.Fisch. (1888)

= Cyttaria hariotii =

Species of fungus

Cyttaria hariotii is an edible mushroom commonly called llao llao, llaullao and pan de indio. The fungus, found in Patagonia, southern Chile and Argentina, is parasitic on Nothofagus (southern beech) trees. The fungus affects its hosts internally in its sap ducts; the tree defends itself by generating galls to bypass the sap blockages. The fungus expands out of the gall to other parts of the tree. That grows in the branches of the trees as if it was a fruit. This one is a great edible mushroom of sweet flavor with which desserts, sweets and even icecreams are made.
