= Nothofagus rubra =

Conservation status
- Least Concern (IUCN 3.1)

Scientific classification
- Kingdom: Plantae
- Clade: Embryophytes
- Clade: Tracheophytes
- Clade: Spermatophytes
- Clade: Angiosperms
- Clade: Eudicots
- Clade: Rosids
- Order: Fagales
- Family: Nothofagaceae
- Genus: Nothofagus
- Subgenus: Nothofagus subg. Brassospora
- Species: N. rubra

Binomial name
- Nothofagus rubra Steenis (1952)

Synonyms
- Synonymy: Nothofagus bernhardii Steenis (1952); Nothofagus decipiens Steenis (1952); Nothofagus dura Steenis (1952); Nothofagus eymae Steenis (1952); Trisyngyne bernhardii (Steenis) Heenan & Smissen (2013); Trisyngyne decipiens (Steenis) Heenan & Smissen (2013); Trisyngyne dura (Steenis) Heenan & Smissen (2013); Trisyngyne eymae (Steenis) Heenan & Smissen (2013); Trisyngyne rubra (Steenis) Heenan & Smissen (2013)

Species of flowering plant

Nothofagus rubra is a species of tree in the family Nothofagaceae. It is endemic to New Guinea. It grows in montane rain forests.
