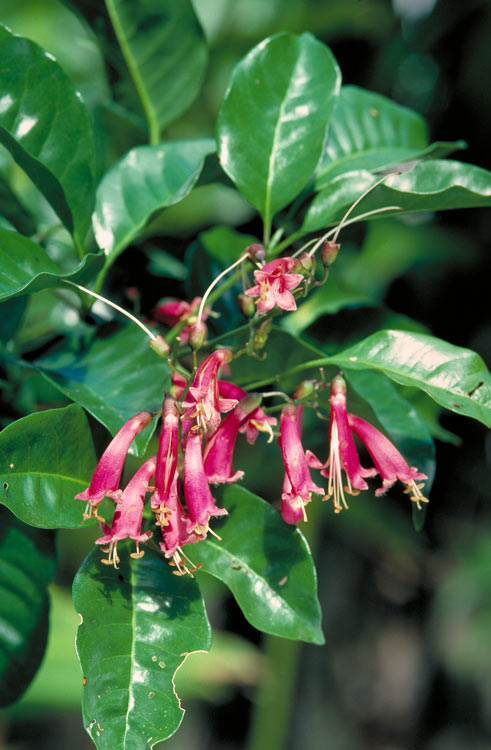
- Flowers

Conservation status
- Least Concern (NCA)

Scientific classification
- Kingdom: Plantae
- Clade: Tracheophytes
- Clade: Angiosperms
- Clade: Eudicots
- Clade: Asterids
- Order: Lamiales
- Family: Bignoniaceae
- Genus: Neosepicaea
- Species: N. jucunda

Binomial name
- Neosepicaea jucunda (F.Muell.) Steenis
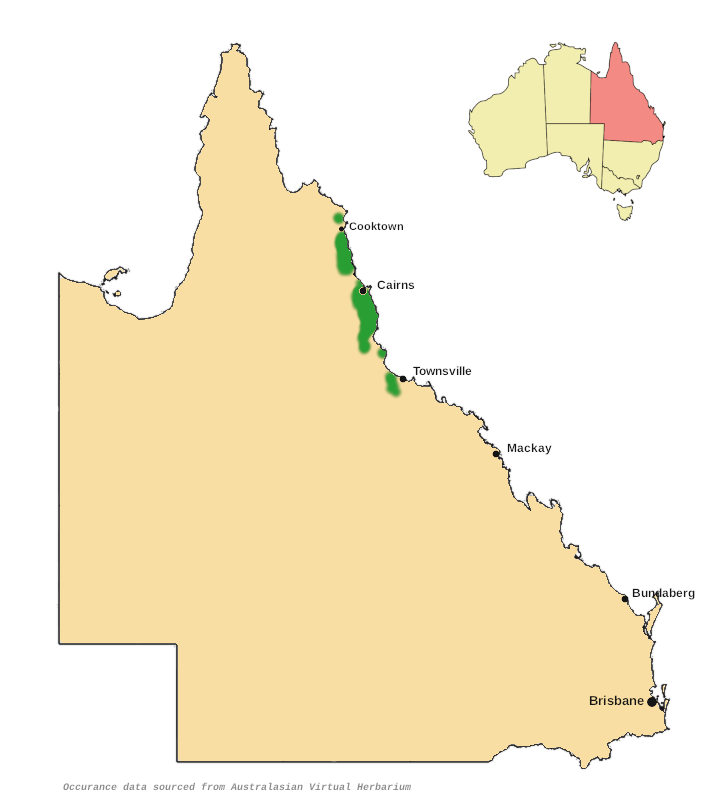

Synonyms
- Haussmannia jucunda F.Muell.; Haussmannianthes jucunda (F.Muell.) Steenis; Nyctocalos jucundum (F.Muell.) Seem.; Campsis haussmannii F.Muell.

= Neosepicaea jucunda =

Species of flowering plant

Neosepicaea jucunda, commonly known as jungle vine, is a species of plant in the jacaranda family Bignoniaceae. It is a twining vine that is native to the Wet Tropics bioregion of Queensland, Australia, and was first described in 1864.

== Description ==
=== Stem and foliage ===
It is a twining vine with a stem diameter up to 7 cm (2.8 in). It has trifoliate leaves (i.e. compound leaves that are divided into three leaflets) that are opposite and decussate. The leaf stalk, or petiole (botany), may be as long as 10 cm (3.9 in). The leaflet blades can be up to 17 cm (6.7 in) long and 6.5 cm (2.6 in) wide.

=== Flowers & fruit ===
The inflorescence is a panicle produced from any part of the stem or branches, carrying a number of pinkish-purple tubular flowers. The flowers are about 15 mm (0.6 in) wide when fully open, and about 30 mm (1.2 in) long with a number of short lobes at the apex. The fruit is a capsule (fruit) about 11 cm (4.3 in) long and 2 to 3 cm (0.79 to 1.18 in) around. It splits along a longitudinal seam on maturity, releasing numerous winged seeds.

== Distribution and habitat ==
This plant grows in rainforest of northeast Queensland, from a little north of Cooktown to about Townsville. The altitudinal range is from sea level to about 1,100 m (3,600 ft).

== Taxonomy ==
It was first described in 1864 (as Haussmannia jucunda) by Ferdinand von Mueller, based on material collected from the Seaview Range, near Ingham. It was transferred to Neosepicaea in 1957 by Dutch botanist Cornelis Gijsbert Gerrit Jan van Steenis.
