= Nothofagus baumanniae =

Conservation status
- Endangered (IUCN 3.1)

Scientific classification
- Kingdom: Plantae
- Clade: Embryophytes
- Clade: Tracheophytes
- Clade: Spermatophytes
- Clade: Angiosperms
- Clade: Eudicots
- Clade: Rosids
- Order: Fagales
- Family: Nothofagaceae
- Genus: Nothofagus
- Subgenus: Nothofagus subg. Brassospora
- Species: N. baumanniae

Binomial name
- Nothofagus baumanniae Baum.-Bod.

Synonyms
- Trisyngine baumanniae

Species of flowering plant

Nothofagus baumanniae is a species of tree in the family Nothofagaceae. It is endemic to New Caledonia, where it grows in forests at high elevations. The species is threatened by fires, nickel mining and climate change.
