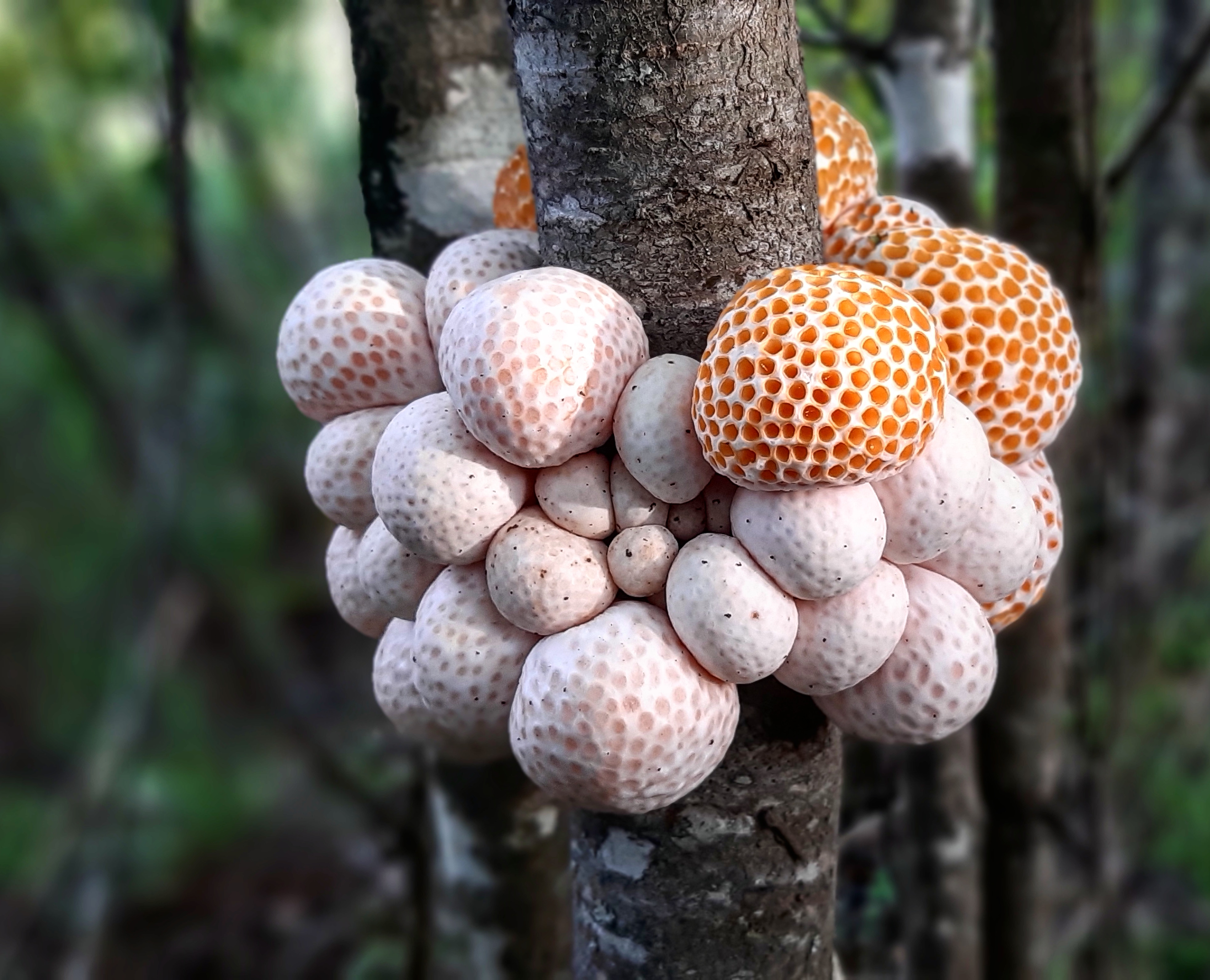
- Cyttaria espinosae from Chile growing in a tree branch

Scientific classification
- Kingdom: Fungi
- Division: Ascomycota
- Class: Leotiomycetes
- Order: Cyttariales
- Family: Cyttariaceae
- Genus: Cyttaria
- Species: C. espinosae

Binomial name
- Cyttaria espinosae Lloyd

= Cyttaria espinosae =

Species of fungus

Cyttaria espinosae, also known by its local name digüeñe, dihueñe, lihueñe, quireñe, pinatra, or quideñe, is an orange-white coloured and edible species of ascomycete fungus.

== Description ==
The fruiting bodies are whitish orange to orange while juvenile and orange-ochre when mature.

== Distribution and habitat ==
The species is distributed between Valparaíso Region and Los Lagos Region in Chile. It grows on Nothofagus trees.

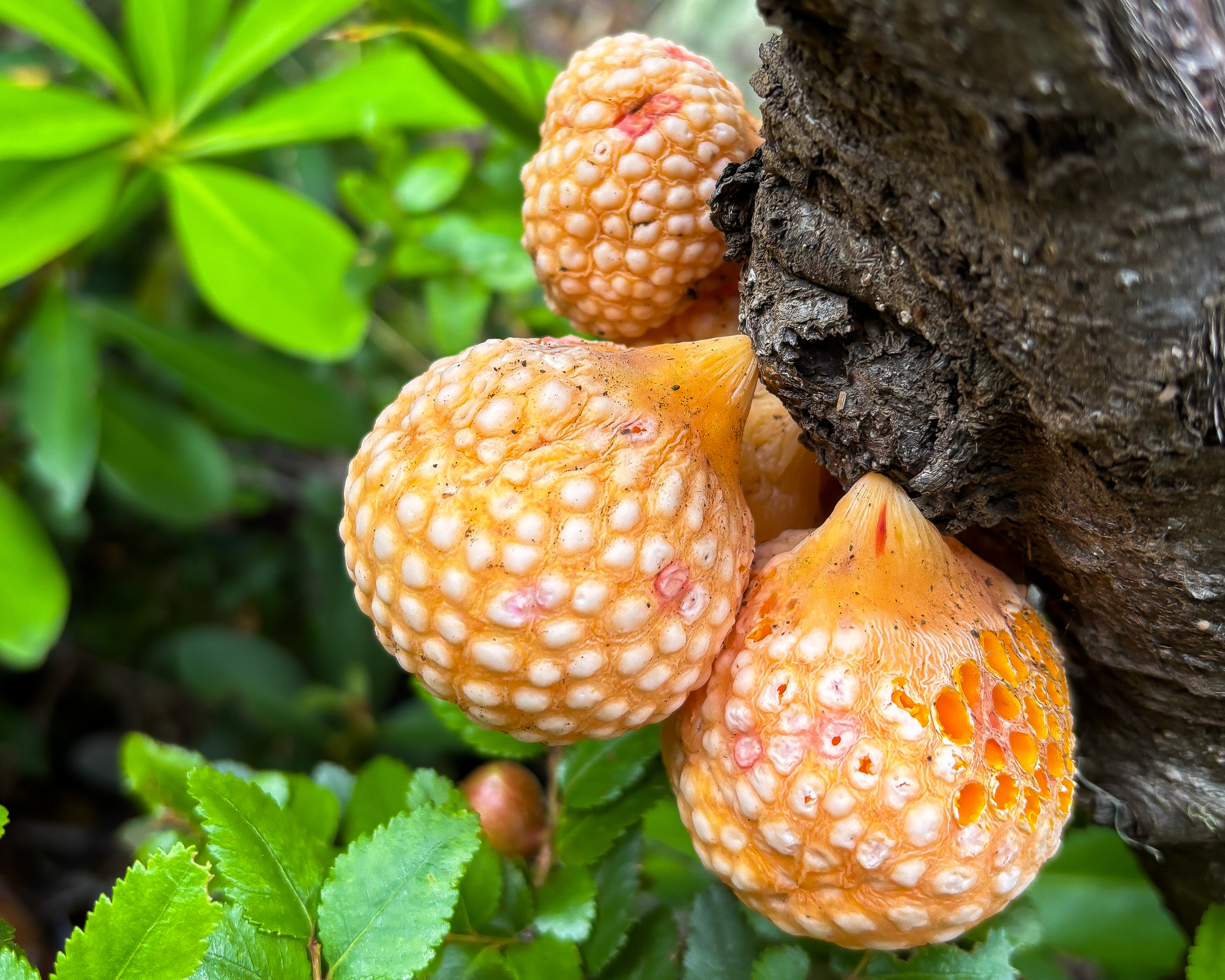
A group of Cytteria Espinosae attached to a tree trunk.

== Culinary use ==
C. espinosae's flavor is described as between sweet and bland. It is the most consumed of the Chilean Cyttaria. In Patagonian cuisine, the digüeñe is usually consumed fresh in salads or fried with scrambled eggs for empanada stuffing. They are traditionally consumed by the Mapuche people.
