= Neosepicaea aurantiaca =

Scientific classification
- Kingdom: Plantae
- Clade: Embryophytes
- Clade: Tracheophytes
- Clade: Spermatophytes
- Clade: Angiosperms
- Clade: Eudicots
- Clade: Asterids
- Order: Lamiales
- Family: Bignoniaceae
- Genus: Neosepicaea
- Species: N. aurantiaca

Binomial name
- Neosepicaea aurantiaca (Diels) Steenis

Synonyms
- Tecomanthe aurantiaca Diels

Species of flowering plant

Neosepicaea aurantiaca is a species of plant in the family Bignoniaceae. It is a vine native to the Sepik district of Papua New Guinea, first described (as Tecomanthe aurantiaca) by Ludwig Diels in 1922.
