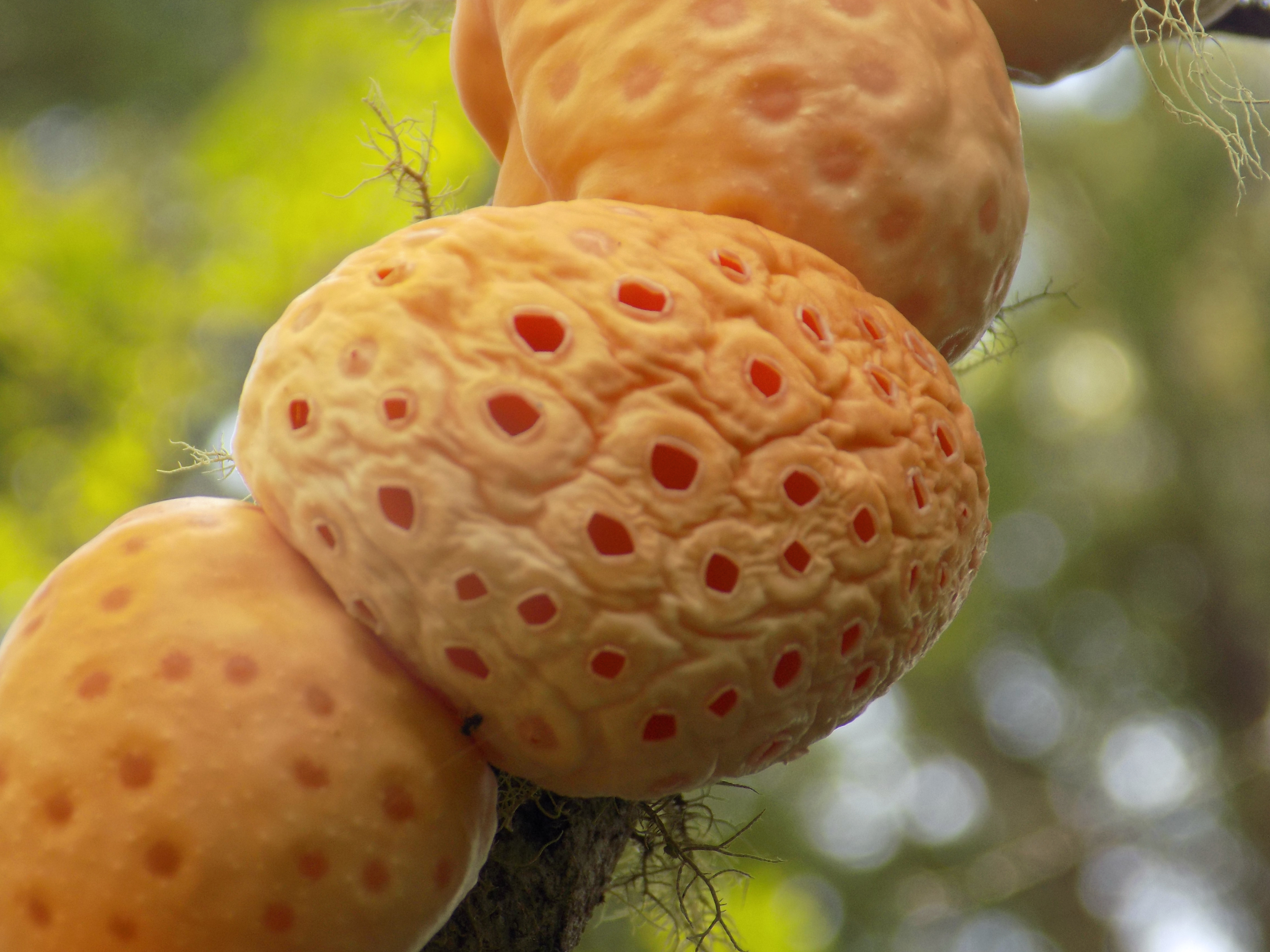

Scientific classification
- Kingdom: Fungi
- Division: Ascomycota
- Class: Leotiomycetes
- Order: Cyttariales
- Family: Cyttariaceae
- Genus: Cyttaria
- Species: C. berteroi

Binomial name
- Cyttaria berteroi Berk.

Synonyms
- Cyttaria reichei Henn. 1900; Cyttaria berterii Mont. 1850

= Cyttaria berteroi =

Species of fungus

Cyttaria berteroi is a species of mushroom described by Miles Joseph Berkeley in 1842. Cyttaria berteroi belongs to the genus Cyttaria and the family Cyttariaceae. No subspecies are listed in the Catalogue of Life.
