= Nothofagus codonandra =

Conservation status
- Near Threatened (IUCN 3.1)

Scientific classification
- Kingdom: Plantae
- Clade: Embryophytes
- Clade: Tracheophytes
- Clade: Spermatophytes
- Clade: Angiosperms
- Clade: Eudicots
- Clade: Rosids
- Order: Fagales
- Family: Nothofagaceae
- Genus: Nothofagus
- Subgenus: Nothofagus subg. Brassospora
- Species: N. codonandra

Binomial name
- Nothofagus codonandra (Baill.) Steenis (1954)

Synonyms
- Trisyngyne codonandra Baill. (1874)

Species of flowering plant

Nothofagus codonandra is a species of tree in the family Nothofagaceae. It is endemic to New Caledonia. It grows in the southern and central portions of the island above 150 meters elevation.
