= Nothofagus brassii =

Conservation status
- Least Concern (IUCN 3.1)

Scientific classification
- Kingdom: Plantae
- Clade: Embryophytes
- Clade: Tracheophytes
- Clade: Spermatophytes
- Clade: Angiosperms
- Clade: Eudicots
- Clade: Rosids
- Order: Fagales
- Family: Nothofagaceae
- Genus: Nothofagus
- Subgenus: Nothofagus subg. Brassospora
- Species: N. brassii

Binomial name
- Nothofagus brassii Steenis

Synonyms
- Nothofagus recurva Steenis (1952); Nothofagus recurva var. microphylla Steenis (1953); Trisyngyne brassii (Steenis) Heenan & Smissen (2013); Trisyngyne recurva (Steenis) Heenan & Smissen (2013)

Species of flowering plant

Nothofagus brassii is a species of tree in the family Nothofagaceae. It is endemic to New Guinea. It is commonly known in Indonesia as Sagé, sagé hitam (Dani, Wamena, Highland Papua), sahé (Yali, Highland Papua), and Digi (Mee, Central Papua).

== Description ==
Nothofagus brassii is a monoecious tree, which grows up to 40 meters tall, with a trunk that can exceed 1 meter in diameter. Young leaves are bright reddish-brown. It fruits and flowers in October and November.

== Range and habitat ==
Nothofagus brassii is found in the highlands of New Guinea. It grows in montane forest, seldom below 1000 meters elevation. Nothofagus forest is generally found above a lower montane belt of oak relatives Castanopsis and Lithocarpus (family Fagaceae). The transition between the fagaceous forests and Nothofagus forests is often abrupt, and less often the forest types intergrade or intersperse.

Nothofagus forest usually extends up to 3000 meters, where it transitions to upper montane forest typically dominated by conifers. N. brassii is more often found in upper montane forest than other Nothofagus species. It grows with N. starkenborghiorum in montane forest around Lake Habbema in the Jayawijaya Range of Western New Guinea from about 2000 to 3000 meters elevation, and in upper montane mossy forest from approximately 3,000 to 3,500 meters elevation. It is more common in mossy forest than N. starkenborghiorum.

== Uses ==
The tree is used for timber. It has dark brown to blackish brown outer wood and brown inner wood. It is known by the Indonesian vernacular name sagé hitam, with sagé as the common name of the tree and hitam meaning black. It is used by local people for houses and fences, and logged commercially. Since the 2000s it has been the target of massive illegal logging in parts of its range, including in Lorentz National Park.

The Dani people of the Baliem Valley in western New Guinea use the leaves and bark of N. brassii and N. starkenborghiorum (both commonly known as sagé) to treat many chronic illnesses with symptoms resembling cancer and degenerative diseases.

Nothofagus brassii may contain Nothofagin, a chemical constituent also found in N. fusca from New Zealand. Nothofagin is a dihydrochalcone, a phenolic antioxidant and C-linked phloretin glucoside, which may account for its efficacy in traditional medicine.
