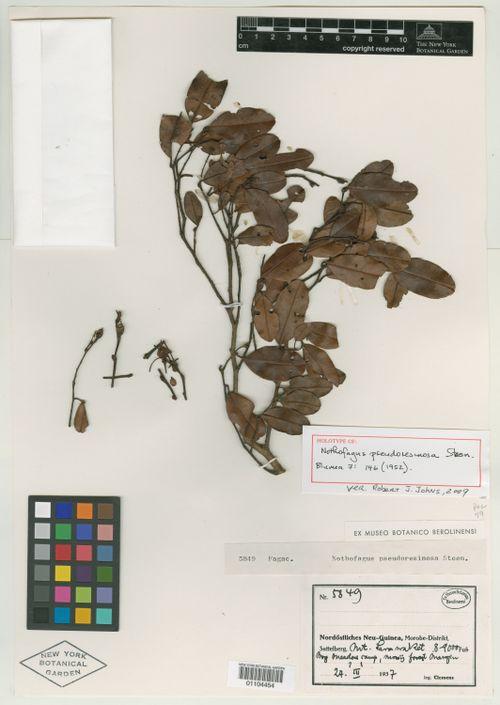

Conservation status
- Near Threatened (IUCN 3.1)

Scientific classification
- Kingdom: Plantae
- Clade: Tracheophytes
- Clade: Angiosperms
- Clade: Eudicots
- Clade: Rosids
- Order: Fagales
- Family: Nothofagaceae
- Genus: Nothofagus
- Subgenus: Nothofagus subg. Brassospora
- Species: N. pseudoresinosa

Binomial name
- Nothofagus pseudoresinosa Steenis (1952)

Synonyms
- Nothofagus pseudoresinosa var. microphylla Steenis; Trisyngyne pseudoresinosa (Steenis) Heenan & Smissen (2013)

= Nothofagus pseudoresinosa =

Species of flowering plant

Nothofagus pseudoresinosa is a species of tree in the family Nothofagaceae. It is endemic to Papua New Guinea. It grows in montane rain forests from 2,500 to 2,750 meters elevation in central and southeastern Papua New Guinea.
