= Nothofagus crenata =

Conservation status
- Vulnerable (IUCN 3.1)

Scientific classification
- Kingdom: Plantae
- Clade: Embryophytes
- Clade: Tracheophytes
- Clade: Spermatophytes
- Clade: Angiosperms
- Clade: Eudicots
- Clade: Rosids
- Order: Fagales
- Family: Nothofagaceae
- Genus: Nothofagus
- Subgenus: Nothofagus subg. Brassospora
- Species: N. crenata

Binomial name
- Nothofagus crenata Steenis

Synonyms
- Trisyngyne crenata (Steenis) Heenan & Smissen (2013)

Species of flowering plant

Nothofagus crenata is a species of tree in the family Nothofagaceae. It is endemic to New Guinea. It grows in lowland rain forest below 900 meters elevation.

There are two accepted varieties:

- Nothofagus crenata var. crenata
- Nothofagus crenata var. sapeii Steenis
