= Nothofagus grandis =

Conservation status
- Least Concern (IUCN 3.1)

Scientific classification
- Kingdom: Plantae
- Clade: Embryophytes
- Clade: Tracheophytes
- Clade: Spermatophytes
- Clade: Angiosperms
- Clade: Eudicots
- Clade: Rosids
- Order: Fagales
- Family: Nothofagaceae
- Genus: Nothofagus
- Subgenus: Nothofagus subg. Brassospora
- Species: N. grandis

Binomial name
- Nothofagus grandis Steenis (1952)

Synonyms
- Trisyngyne grandis (Steenis) Heenan & Smissen (2013)

Species of flowering plant

Nothofagus grandis is a species of tree in the family Nothofagaceae. It is endemic to New Guinea. It grows in lower montane rain forests from 900 to 1,500 meters elevation.
