= Neosepicaea leptophylla =

Scientific classification
- Kingdom: Plantae
- Clade: Tracheophytes
- Clade: Angiosperms
- Clade: Eudicots
- Clade: Asterids
- Order: Lamiales
- Family: Bignoniaceae
- Genus: Neosepicaea
- Species: N. leptophylla

Binomial name
- Neosepicaea leptophylla (Blume) Steenis

Synonyms
- Gelseminum leptophyllum (Blume) Kuntze; Pandorea leptophylla (Blume) Boerl.; Tecoma leptophylla Blume; Neosepicaea superba Steenis

Species of flowering plant

Neosepicaea leptophylla is a species of plant in the family Bignoniaceae. It is a vine native to New Guinea, growing to about 20 m (66 ft) long and a stem diameter of 3 cm (1.2 in).
