= Nothofagus womersleyi =

Conservation status
- Critically Endangered (IUCN 3.1)

Scientific classification
- Kingdom: Plantae
- Clade: Embryophytes
- Clade: Tracheophytes
- Clade: Spermatophytes
- Clade: Angiosperms
- Clade: Eudicots
- Clade: Rosids
- Order: Fagales
- Family: Nothofagaceae
- Genus: Nothofagus
- Subgenus: Nothofagus subg. Brassospora
- Species: N. womersleyi

Binomial name
- Nothofagus womersleyi Steenis (1972)

Synonyms
- Trisyngyne womersleyi (Steenis) Heenan & Smissen (2013)

Species of flowering plant

Nothofagus womersleyi is a species of plant in the family Nothofagaceae. It is endemic to Kebar Valley on the Vogelkop Peninsula in West Papua (Indonesia). It is a Critically Endangered species threatened by habitat loss.

It was proposed to be renamed Trisyngyne womersleyi in 2013.
