= Nothofagus carrii =

Conservation status
- Least Concern (IUCN 3.1)

Scientific classification
- Kingdom: Plantae
- Clade: Embryophytes
- Clade: Tracheophytes
- Clade: Spermatophytes
- Clade: Angiosperms
- Clade: Eudicots
- Clade: Rosids
- Order: Fagales
- Family: Nothofagaceae
- Genus: Nothofagus
- Subgenus: Nothofagus subg. Brassospora
- Species: N. carrii

Binomial name
- Nothofagus carrii Steenis (1952)

Synonyms
- Trisyngyne carrii (Steenis) Heenan & Smissen (2013)

Species of flowering plant

Nothofagus carrii is a species of tree in the family Nothofagaceae. It is endemic to New Guinea.

It is a canopy tree, reaching 20 to 45 meters in height with a trunk diameter of 25 to 130 cm. The base is often buttressed. Trees growing on exposed ridges are typically much smaller in size.

It ranges from the Arfak Mountains of western New Guinea's Vogelkop Peninsula along the Central Range to the Huon Peninsula and Papuan Peninsula of Papua New Guinea, and on the D'Entrecasteaux Islands. Nothofagus carrii grows in lowland and montane forests from below 900 meters elevation up to 2,200 meters elevation.
