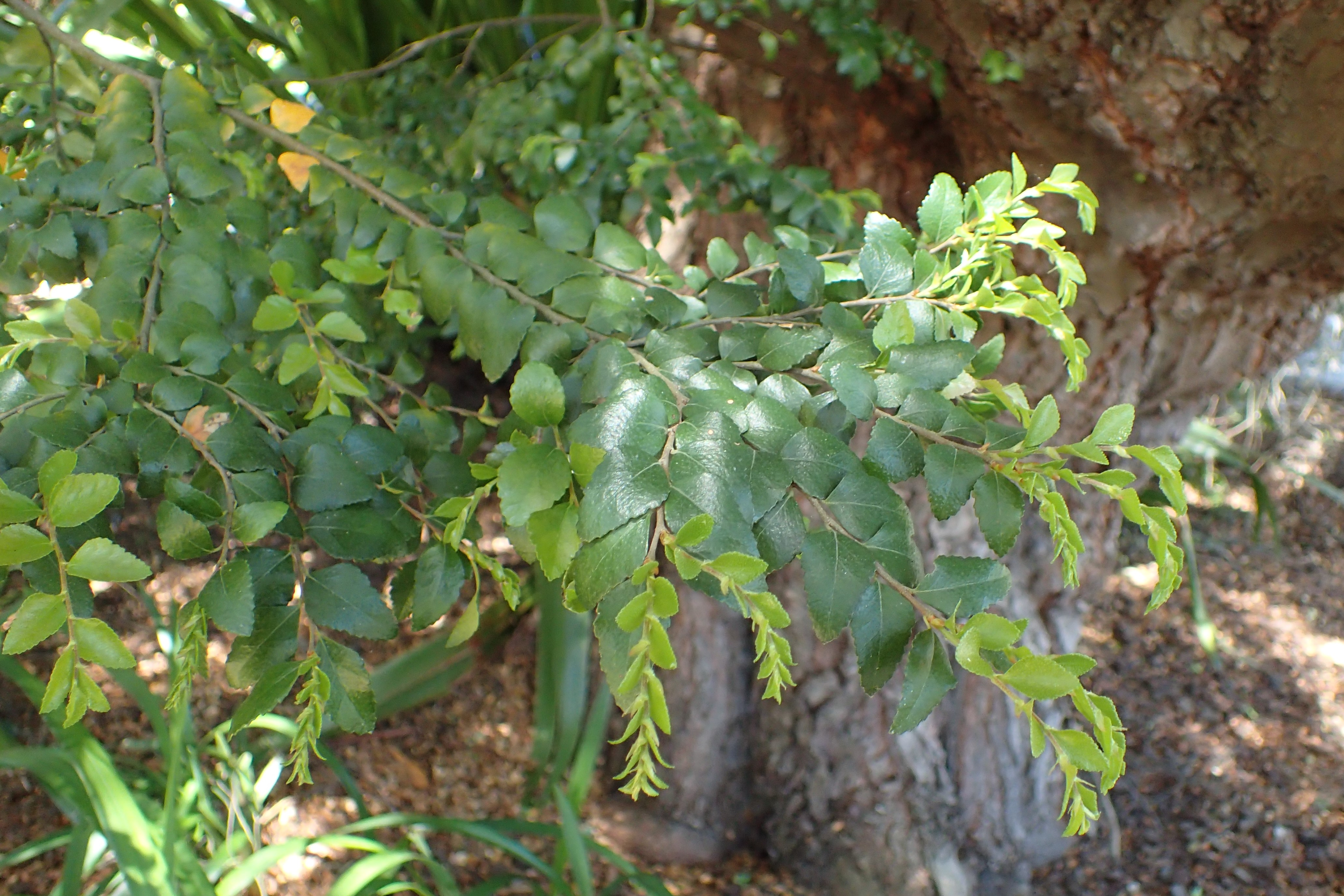
- Adult Foliage

Conservation status
- Vulnerable (IUCN 3.1)

Scientific classification
- Kingdom: Plantae
- Clade: Embryophytes
- Clade: Tracheophytes
- Clade: Spermatophytes
- Clade: Angiosperms
- Clade: Eudicots
- Clade: Rosids
- Order: Fagales
- Family: Nothofagaceae
- Genus: Nothofagus
- Subgenus: Nothofagus subg. Lophozonia
- Species: N. cunninghamii

Binomial name
- Nothofagus cunninghamii (Hook.f.)Oerst.

Synonyms
- Lophozonia cunninghamii Fagus cunninghamii

= Nothofagus cunninghamii =

Species of tree

Nothofagus cunninghamii, commonly known as myrtle beech or Tasmanian myrtle, is the dominant species of cool temperate rainforests in Tasmania and Southern Victoria. It has low fire resistance and grows best in partial shade conditions.

It has rough bark covered in mosses and epiphytic growth. Its leaves are triangular-shaped, small, and dark green with differentiated margins. It has white unisexual flowers.

== Description and habit ==
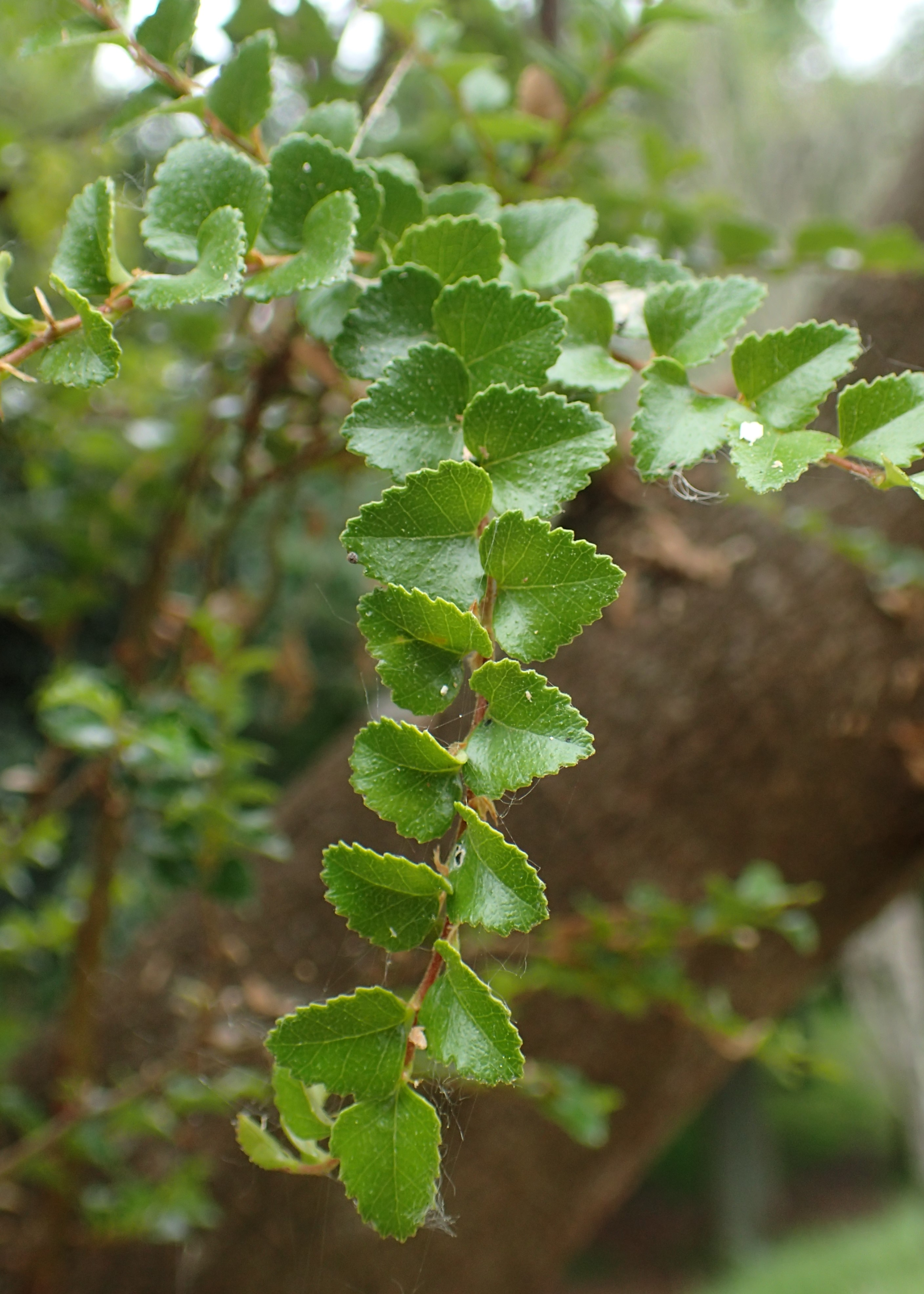
Triangular leaves with clear teeth of N. cunninghamii leaves

N. cunninghamii range from trees of up to 50 meters in protected rainforest valleys to low-growing alpine shrubs less than 1 m tall in exposed conditions. Maximum height is about 55 m.

The leaves are simple and alternate, growing 0.5–1.5 cm long, and in Victoria up to 2 cm (0.8 in) long. The leaves are dark green, with new growth brilliant red, pink or orange in spring. They are triangular with irregular minute teeth with craspedodromous veins with all secondary veins terminate at leaf margins and spread from a central primary midrib vein. The tertiary veins are poorly defined.

The plants have separate unisexual male and female flowers on the same tree. Male flowers have hanging stamens and grow solitarily while female flowers lack stamens and cluster by leaves near the tips of branches. They flower in November and December. The fruit is small (about 6 mm) and woody. They contain three small-winged nuts with fertile seeds from December to February. Seeds germinate in 6–8 weeks.

N. cunninghamii is a fairly robust species, requiring around 900 mm of rain spread throughout the year. It is also frost tolerant to –7 °C.

It can grow in full shade, albeit slowly, through to full sun, given enough water, but grows best in partial sun conditions. It grows best in moist and well-draining soil.

== Distribution and habitat ==
N. cunninghamii is the dominant species in cool temperate rainforest across Tasmania and southern Victoria.

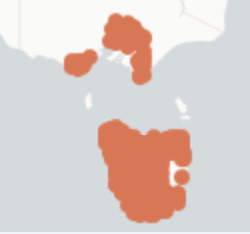
Range according to Atlas of Living Australia

It is most common in Tasmania, where it occurs in most regions except the drier Midlands and east coast. The largest remaining tract of N. cunninghamii-dominated rainforest is takayna/Tarkine in the Northwest of Tasmania. It is the largest remaining tract of cool temperate rainforest in Australia. In Victoria, N. cunninghamii grows best in the deep red mountain soils or in highly organic soils in the Central Highlands, Strzelecki Ranges, Otway Ranges, and Wilsons Promontory.

== Taxonomy and naming ==
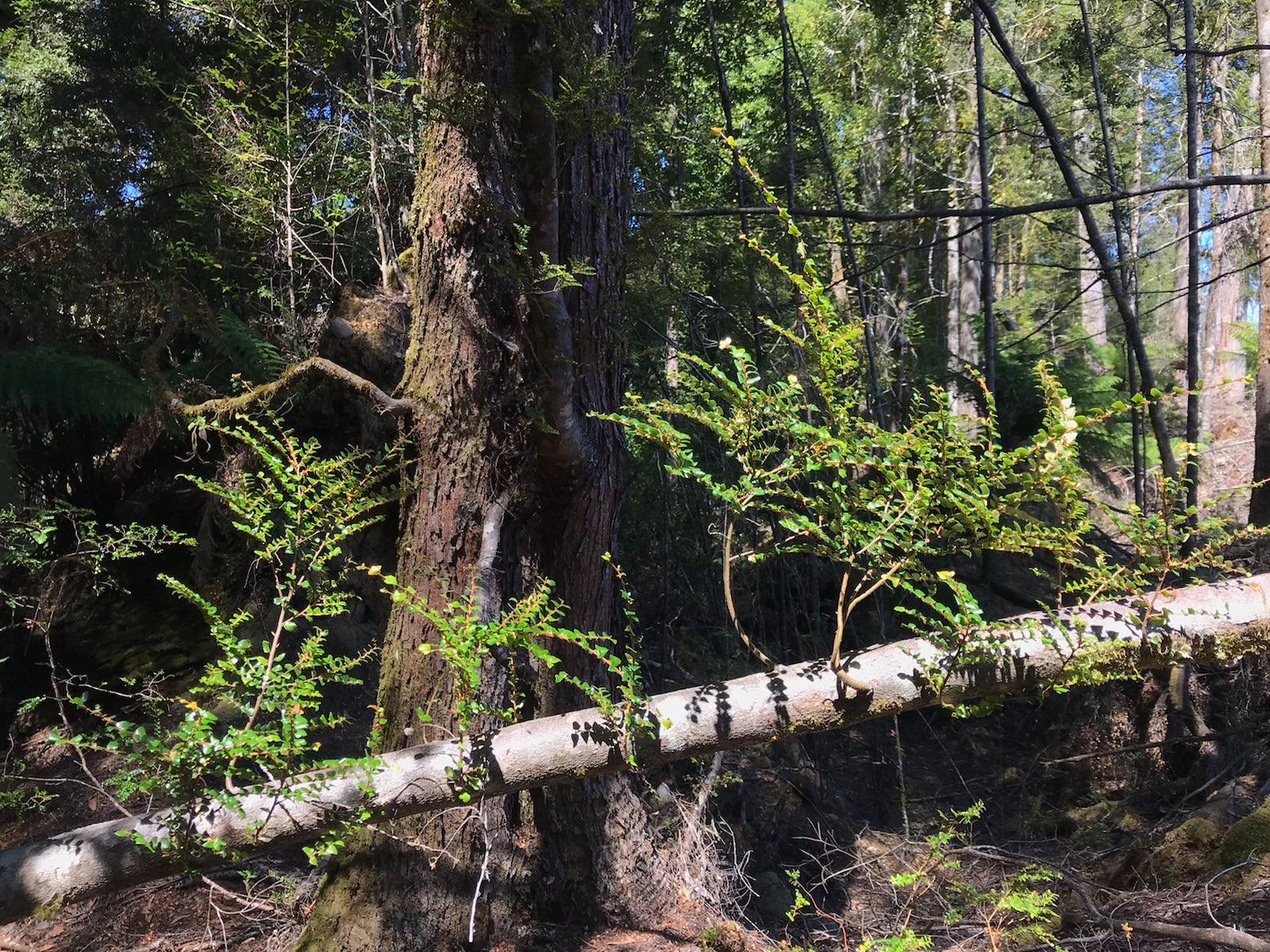
Young N. cunninghamii in takayna/Tarkine

The beech or Fagaceae family includes nine genera: Fagus, Nothofagus, Lithocarpus, Castanopsis, Colombobalanus, Castanea, Chrysolepis, Quercus, and Trigonobalanus.

Nothofagus means "false beech" although there is some suggestion that this is due to a misspelling of the intent NOTOfagus, meaning "southern beech." There is a suggestion that the genus was changed due to a spelling error. There are about 40 species of Nothofagus, with only three occurring in Australia: N cunninghamii, gunnii, and moorei. Nothofagus gunnii is a deciduous beech endemic to Tasmania that grows in low-fire, alpine regions. Nothofagus moorei, or Antarctic beech, is another cool temperate rainforest evergreen found in patches in New South Wales and Southern Queensland.

Nothofagus cunninghamii is named for the 19th century botanist and 'explorer', Allan Cunningham, who is best known for his plant collection career throughout Australia.

In 2013, N. cunninghamii was proposed to be renamed Lophozonia cunninghamii. This is due to the other species in the family Nothofagaceae with significant differences in morphology and genetics throughout South America, New Zealand, Australia, and other relict Gondwanan rainforests. There has been controversy over the change in name from Nothofagus to Lophozonia with the argument that the phylogenetic history suits retaining the genus Nothofagus.

== Ecology ==
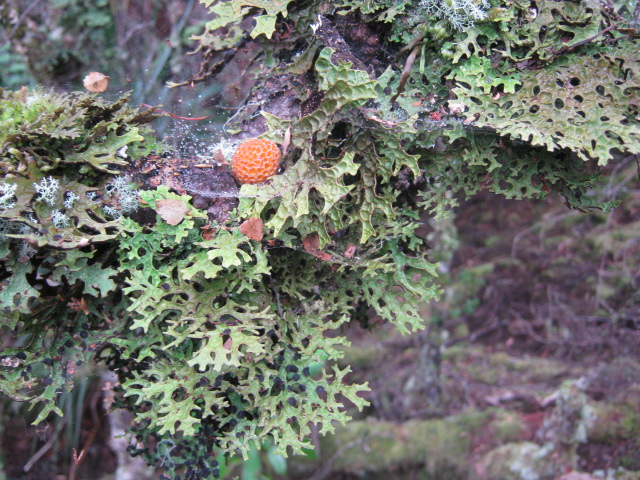
Cyttaria gunii on Nothofagus cunninghamii

Occasionally one may see round, orange-like fruiting bodies of a fungus protruding from the trunk; this is Cyttaria gunnii. Cyttaria are obligate biotrophic associates of myrtle beech and have co-evolved with Nothofagus.

It grows in temperate rainforest with other rainforest species including southern sassafras (Atherosperma moschatum), leatherwood (Eucryphia lucida), horizontal(Anodopetalum biglandulosum) and celery-top pine (Phyllocladus aspleniifolius). They also form important habitat for birds who use the tree for nesting and safety.

N. cunninghamii grow throughout a variety of ecosystems but establish best in partial sun in wet sclerophyll understory. In mixed forests, the tree species will be made up of primarily N. cunninghamii and sassafras with a tall eucalyptus overstory. Once these remaining eucalypts die, the myrtle beech will become the dominant species forming a pure rainforest. This process takes several hundred years. This ecosystem is retained by rare fires in wet conditions that prevent eucalypt seeds from germinating. In the event of a big fire, the pure rainforest will be replaced by eucalypts and the process of reestablishing a rainforest will restart. Myrtle beech rarely survives intense fire, and must re-establish from neighbouring areas. They can, however, survive light fires by regenerating from seed or vegetatively from basal epicormic shoots.

Both N. cunninghamii and the closely related N. moorei are excellent hosts for epiphytes.

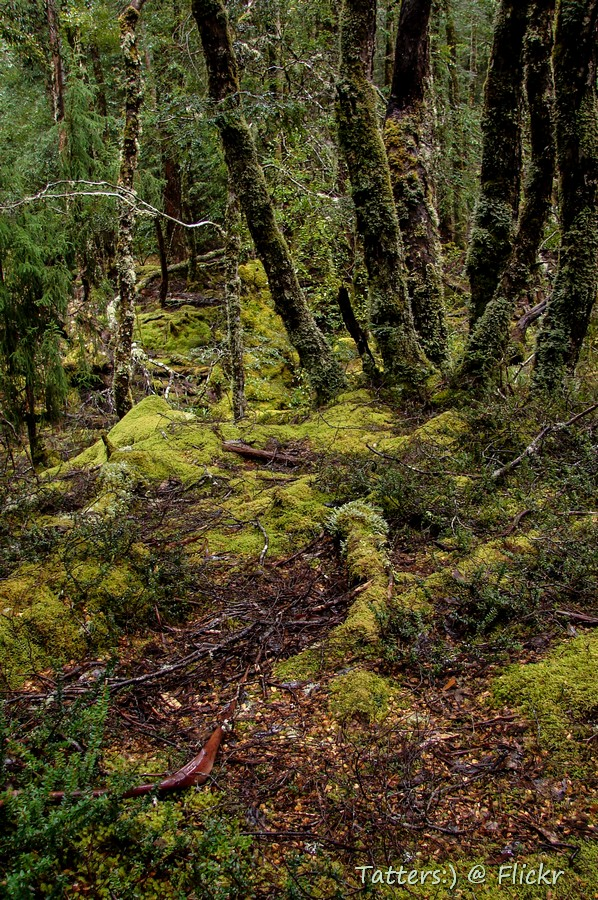
Cool temperate rainforest ecosystem

== Evolution ==
Nothofagus is an ancient relict that was present in Gondwanan rainforests and today grows across the Southern Hemisphere.

N. cunninghamii is most closely related to N. moorei, the other species of evergreen Nothofagus endemic to Australia. The two likely evolved from a Paleogene ancestor. Due to cooling since the Paleogene, leaves may have been pressured to evolve to smaller sizes in colder environments. This may explain the evolution toward smaller leaves than their ancestor as well as the northern boundary for N. cunnninghamii where it is replaced by the larger-leafed N. moorei in warmer Northern environments.

== Threats ==
Myrtle wilt, a parasitic fungus, (Chalara australis) attacks myrtle beech when the air or water-borne spores settle on open wounds. Myrtle wilt only infects N. cunninghamii and is a deadly pathogen that infects roots and trunks. It causes tree crown wilting and foliage to turn brown and yellow. C. australis can spread to neighbouring trees through roots, creating large patches of dead trees. Due to higher rates of root graphing, the fungus is more prolific in pure rainforest than mixed forest. Dead stands of this dominant species can completely change the ecosystem in cool temperate rainforests. Infection of myrtle wilt can also increase the impact of other threats such as the ambrosia beetle (Platypus subgranosus). Ambrosia beetles bore holes into myrtles producing a dust called frass. Frass can contribute to the spread of the C. australis and increase available wounds susceptible to the fungus.

Myrtle wilt is a natural disease of N. cunninghamii; research points to a low rate of mortality due to the fungus in undisturbed forest (0.61%) but drastic increase in mortality in areas with human disturbance. In recent years, myrtle wilt has become a serious problem due to poor logging practices. Rates of myrtle wilt are increased along roads, walking tracks, and logging areas likely due to decreased protection against elements, increasing the potential for injury and infection.

Temperate myrtle beech rainforests are not protected in many areas of Tasmania and are threatened by mining and logging. Due to a lack of protection, these rainforest species continue to be threatened by extractive activities.

Due to their low fire resistance, myrtle beech are also threatened by wildfires of increasing intensity and frequency due to climate change. Climate change also increases the threat of myrtle wilt as the fungus is more fit in warmer environments.

== Uses and cultivation ==
It is an excellent cabinetry timber which is hard with strong, tough, close grain. It is a soft pink to reddish brown, often figured and can be polished to a fine sheen. It is used for flooring, joinery, cogs of wheels, and furniture, and is good for steam bending, turnery and carving. It is harvested from old growth forest but the vast majority of the timber is left on the ground as it grows with the heavily harvested mountain ash. Dry density is 700 kg/m3.

It is easily grown from fresh seed, germinating in a few weeks.

Cuttings can be struck, although they tend to perform less well than seed grown plants. Cultivated specimens survive temperatures of 45 °C (113 °F) down to −7 °C (19 °F); though it is known that trees growing in the mountains can withstand lower temperatures at least to −15 °C (5 °F), and no source provenance selection has been made for cultivation from there. Trees cultivated in western Scotland are stout and hardy. Examples of the species can be viewed at The Tasmanian Arboretum.
