= Zelopsis nothofagi =

Scientific classification
- Kingdom: Animalia
- Phylum: Arthropoda
- Class: Insecta
- Order: Hemiptera
- Suborder: Auchenorrhyncha
- Family: Cicadellidae
- Subfamily: Eurymelinae
- Tribe: Macropsini
- Genus: Zelopsis
- Species: Z. nothofagi

Binomial name
- Zelopsis nothofagi Evans, 1966

Species of true bug

Zelopsis nothofagi is a species of leafhopper than is endemic to New Zealand.

== Taxonomy ==
Zelopsis nothofagi was described in 1966.

== Description ==
Depending on sex, Zelopsis nothofagi is between 3–4 mm in length.

== Distribution and habitat ==
Zelopsis nothofagi is widespread on the North Island and South Island of New Zealand. The leafhopper is known to occur in predominantly from lowland to subalpine zones in Nothofagus forest habitat.
