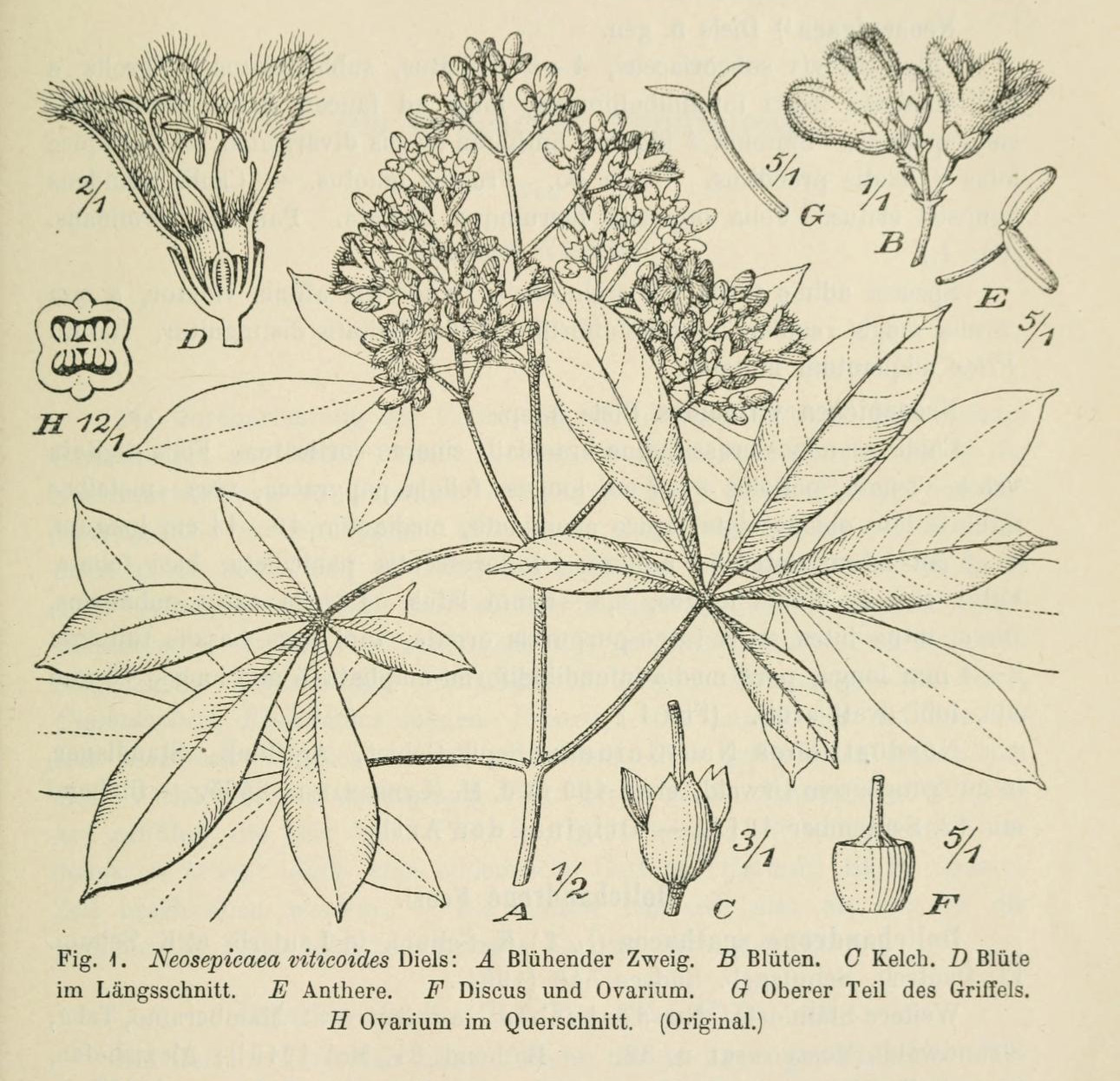
- Botanical sketch

Conservation status
- Near Threatened (NCA)

Scientific classification
- Kingdom: Plantae
- Clade: Tracheophytes
- Clade: Angiosperms
- Clade: Eudicots
- Clade: Asterids
- Order: Lamiales
- Family: Bignoniaceae
- Genus: Neosepicaea
- Species: N. viticoides

Binomial name
- Neosepicaea viticoides Diels

= Neosepicaea viticoides =

Species of flowering plant

Neosepicaea viticoides, commonly known as Cape York jungle vine, is a species of plant in the family Bignoniaceae. It is native to New Guinea and a small part of Cape York Peninsula, Queensland, Australia.

It is a vine with a stem diameter up to 8 cm (3.1 in) thick. The leaves are palmately compound, with three or five leaflets. It occurs in Cape York Peninsula in the vicinity of Lockhart River and in New Guinea.

It was first described by German botanist Ludwig Diels in 1922. In Queensland it has been assigned the conservation status of near threatened.
