= Neosepicaea =

Scientific classification
- Kingdom: Plantae
- Clade: Tracheophytes
- Clade: Angiosperms
- Clade: Eudicots
- Clade: Asterids
- Order: Lamiales
- Family: Bignoniaceae
- Genus: Neosepicaea; Diels

Genus of flowering plants

Neosepicaea is a genus of flowering plants belonging to the family Bignoniaceae.

Its native range is New Guinea to Queensland.

== Species ==
Species:

- Neosepicaea aurantiaca (Diels) Steenis
- Neosepicaea jucunda (F.Muell.) Steenis
- Neosepicaea leptophylla (Blume) Steenis
- Neosepicaea viticoides Diels
