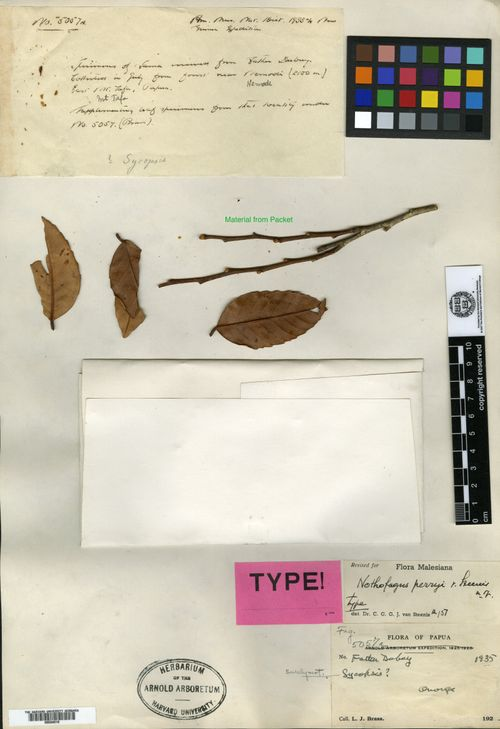

Conservation status
- Least Concern (IUCN 3.1)

Scientific classification
- Kingdom: Plantae
- Clade: Embryophytes
- Clade: Tracheophytes
- Clade: Spermatophytes
- Clade: Angiosperms
- Clade: Eudicots
- Clade: Rosids
- Order: Fagales
- Family: Nothofagaceae
- Genus: Nothofagus
- Subgenus: Nothofagus subg. Brassospora
- Species: N. perryi

Binomial name
- Nothofagus perryi Steenis (1952)

Synonyms
- Trisyngyne perryi (Steenis) Heenan & Smissen (2013)

= Nothofagus perryi =

Species of flowering plant

Nothofagus perryi is a species of tree in the family Nothofagaceae. It is endemic to Papua New Guinea. It grows in montane rain forests from 1,500 to 2,500 metres (4,900 to 8,200 ft) elevation in central and southeastern Papua New Guinea. This plant was first described in 1952 by Cornelis Gijsbert Gerrit Jan van Steenis.
