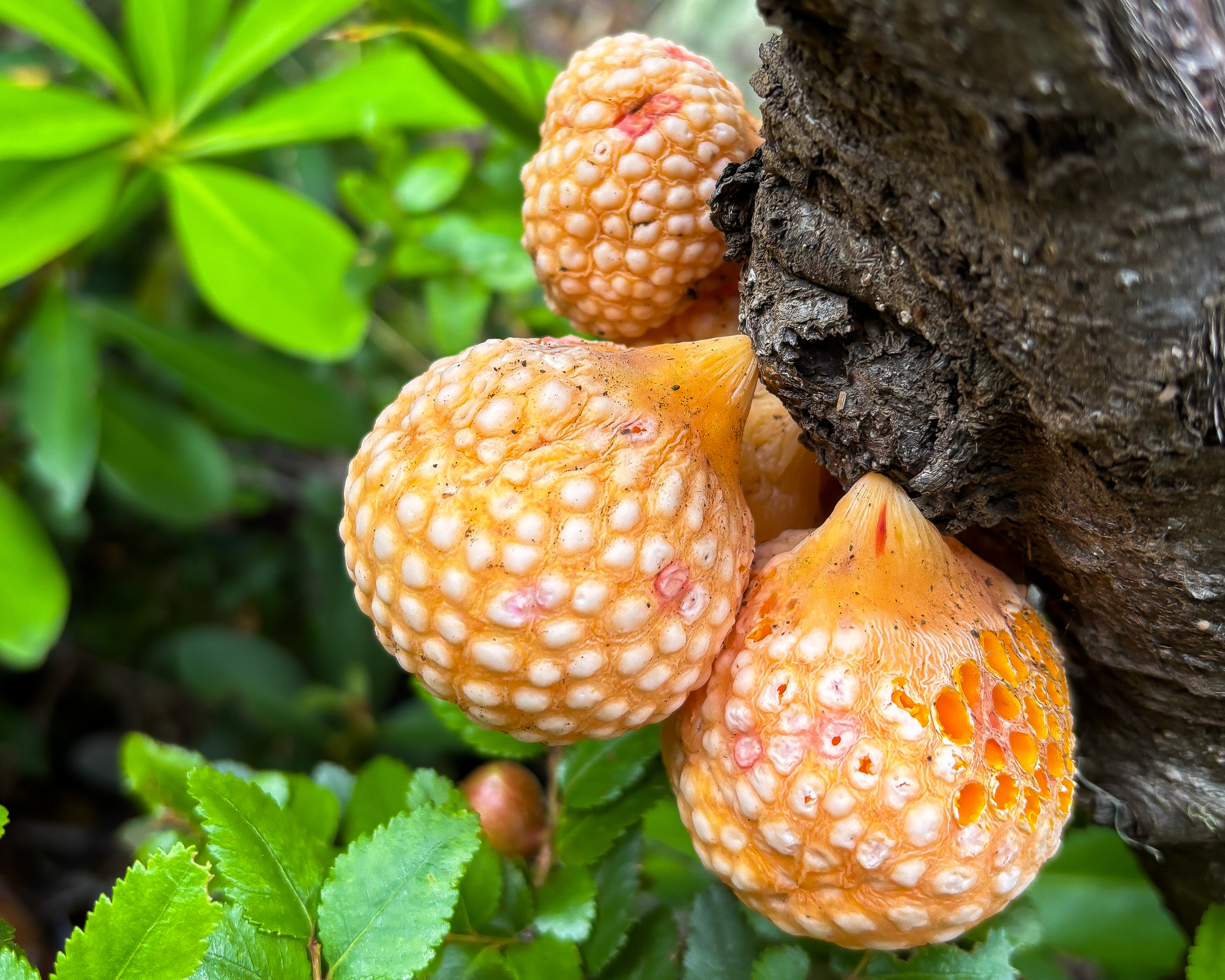
- Cyttaria espinosae from Chile growing in a tree trunk

Scientific classification
- Kingdom: Fungi
- Division: Ascomycota
- Class: Leotiomycetes
- Order: Cyttariales
- Family: Cyttariaceae
- Genus: Cyttaria; Berk. (1842)

Type species
- Cyttaria darwinii Berk. (1842)

Species
- C. berteroi C. darwinii C. espinosae C. gunnii C. hariotii C. nigra C. johowii C. septentrionalis C. exigua C. Hookeri

= Cyttaria =

Genus of fungi

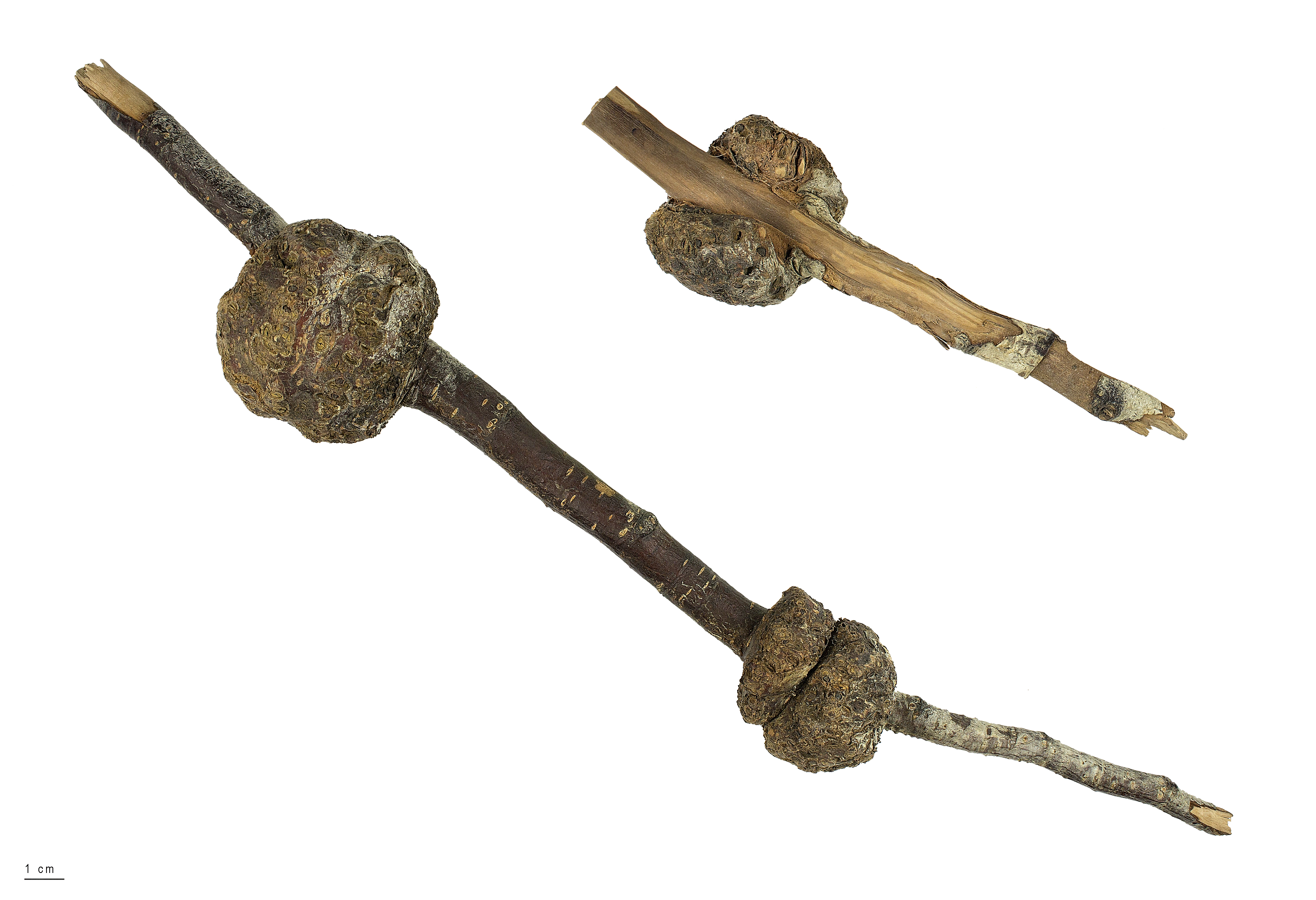
Cyttaria sp. - MHNT

Cyttaria (From Greek Kyttaros, meaning "cell of a honeycomb") is a genus of ascomycete fungi. About 10 species belong to Cyttaria, found in South America, Australia and New Zealand, which are obligatory parasites of southern beech trees from the genus Nothofagus. The "llao llao" fungus Cyttaria hariotii, one of the most common fungi in Andean-Patagonian forests, has been shown to harbor the yeast Saccharomyces eubayanus, which may be source of the lager yeast S. pastorianus cold-tolerance.

== Description ==
=== Morphology ===
Cyttaria was originally described by mycologist Miles Joseph Berkeley in 1842. The ascomata of Cyttaria species are porous with an orange color. Each ascomata consists of multiple apothecia immersed in a gelatinous stroma. Asci are 8 spored, inoperculate and amyloid.

=== Distribution ===
Cyttaria is found exclusively on the southern hemisphere, being commonly found in southern Chile, Argentina, New Zealand and Australia. Its distruibution mirrors the one of Nothofagus.

=== Ethnomycology ===
Certain species of Cyttaria were traditionally consumed by some indigenous groups in southern Chile and Argentina, and continue to be a part in local cuisine.
