= Nothofagus resinosa =

Conservation status
- Least Concern (IUCN 3.1)

Scientific classification
- Kingdom: Plantae
- Clade: Embryophytes
- Clade: Tracheophytes
- Clade: Spermatophytes
- Clade: Angiosperms
- Clade: Eudicots
- Clade: Rosids
- Order: Fagales
- Family: Nothofagaceae
- Genus: Nothofagus
- Subgenus: Nothofagus subg. Brassospora
- Species: N. resinosa

Binomial name
- Nothofagus resinosa Steenis (1952)

Synonyms
- Trisyngyne resinosa (Steenis) Heenan & Smissen (2013)

Species of flowering plant

Nothofagus resinosa is a species of tree in the family Nothofagaceae. It is endemic to New Guinea. It grows in montane rain forests at around 1,560 meters elevation.
