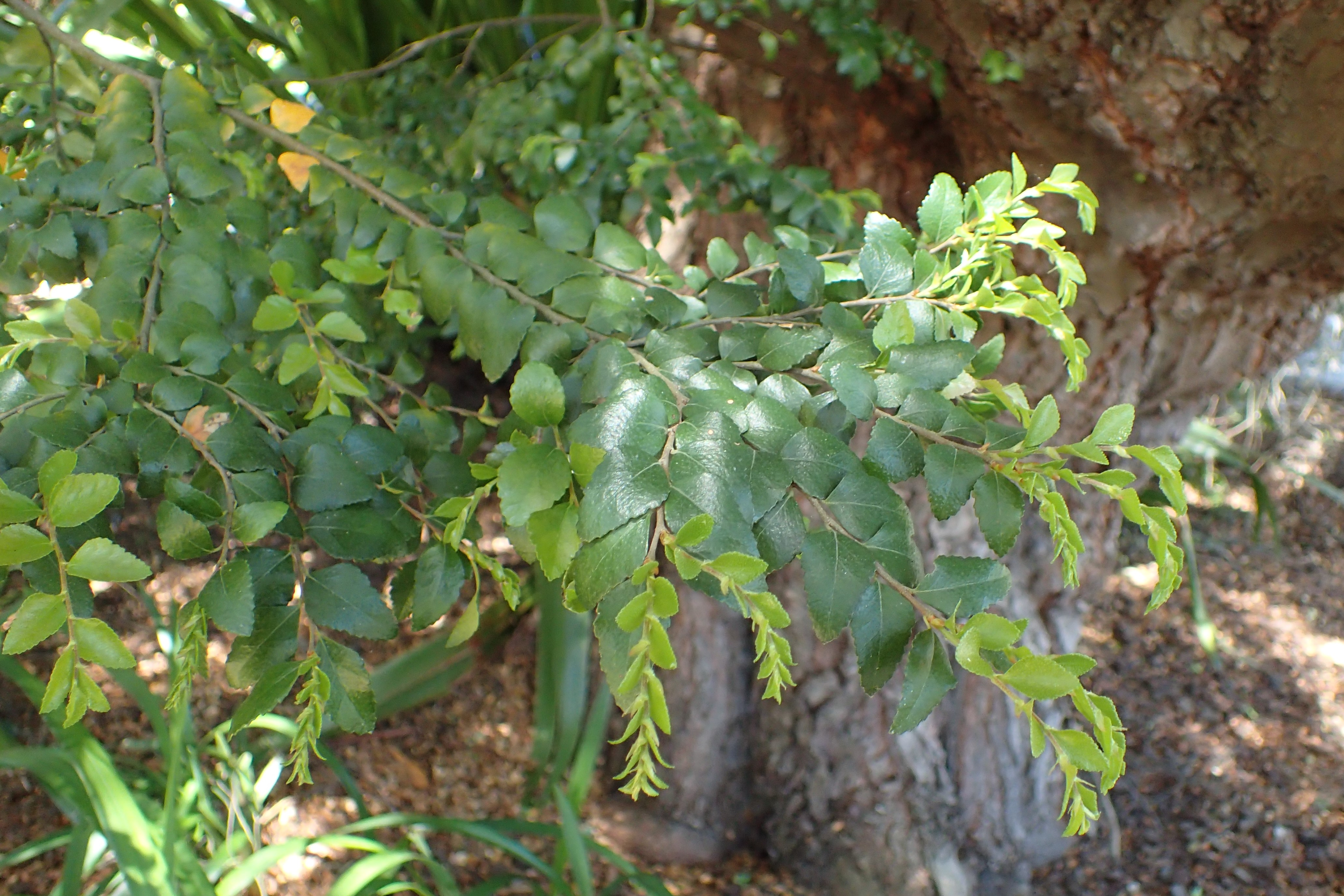
- Nothofagus cunninghamii, Eastern Australia.

Scientific classification
- Kingdom: Plantae
- Clade: Tracheophytes
- Clade: Angiosperms
- Clade: Eudicots
- Clade: Rosids
- Order: Fagales
- Family: Nothofagaceae; Kuprian.
- Genus: Nothofagus; Blume
- The range of Nothofagus.

Synonyms
- Calucechinus Hombr. & Jacquinot ex Decne. in J.S.C.Dumont d'Urville; Calusparassus Hombr. & Jacquinot ex Decne. in J.S.C.Dumont d'Urville; Cliffortioides Dryand. ex Hook.; Fagaster Spach; Fuscospora (R.S.Hill & J.Read) Heenan & Smissen; Lophozonia Turcz.; Myrtilloides Banks & Sol. ex Hook.; Trisyngyne Baill.

= Nothofagus =

Nothofagus Temporal range: Late Cretaceous to recent 83.6–0 Ma

Genus of plants

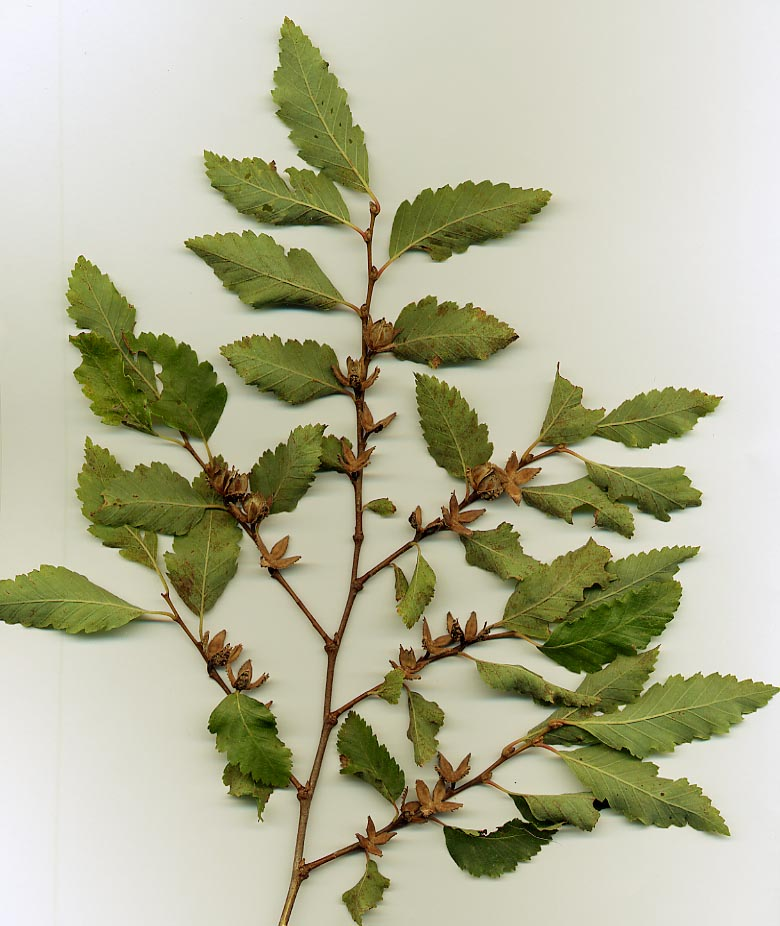
Shoots, leaves, and cupules of N. obliqua

Nothofagus, also known as the southern beeches, is a genus of 43 species of trees and shrubs native to the Southern Hemisphere, found across southern South America (Chile, Argentina) and eastern and southeast Australia, New Zealand, New Guinea, and New Caledonia. The species are ecological dominants in many temperate forests in these regions. Some species are reportedly naturalised in Germany and Great Britain. The genus has a rich fossil record of leaves, cupules, and pollen, with fossils extending into the late Cretaceous period and occurring in Australia, New Zealand, Antarctica, and South America.

== Description ==
The leaves are toothed or entire, evergreen or deciduous. The fruit is a small, flattened or triangular nut, borne in cupules containing one to seven nuts.

Many individual trees are extremely old, and at one time, some populations were thought to be unable to reproduce in present-day conditions where they were growing, except by suckering (clonal reproduction), being remnant forest from a cooler time. Sexual reproduction has since been shown to be possible.

== Taxonomy ==
The genus Nothofagus was first formally described in 1850 by Carl Ludwig Blume who published the description in his book Museum botanicum Lugduno-Batavum, sive, Stirpium exoticarum novarum vel minus cognitarum ex vivis aut siccis brevis expositio et descriptio. Nothofagus means "false beech", which Blume chose to indicate that Nothofagus species were different from beeches in the Northern Hemisphere.

In the past, they were included in the family Fagaceae, but genetic tests revealed them to be genetically distinct, and they are now included in their own family, Nothofagaceae. This taxonomy was introduced in 1962 by Russian botanist and palynologist Ludmila Andreyevna Kuprianova, who used pollen traits to erect Nothofagaceae. A study in 1999 found that the pollen exine ultrastructure of Nothofagus differs from that of Fagaceae genera by its thickness, type of aperture, and ornamentation, reinforcing the placement of Nothofagus in its own family.

=== Species list ===
The following is a list of the 38 species and 4 hybrids accepted by Plants of the World Online as of March 2026:

- Nothofagus aequilateralis (Baum.-Bod.) Steenis (New Caledonia)
- Nothofagus alessandrii Espinosa (Central Chile)
- Nothofagus alpina (Poepp. & Endl.) Oerst. (Argentina South, Chile Central, Chile South)
- Nothofagus antarctica (G.Forst.) Oerst. (Argentina South, Chile Central, Chile South)
- Nothofagus balansae (Baill.) Steenis (New Caledonia)
- Nothofagus baumanniae (Baum.-Bod.) Steenis (New Caledonia)
- Nothofagus betuloides (Mirb.) Oerst. (Argentina South, Chile South)
- Nothofagus brassii Steenis (New Guinea)
- Nothofagus carrii Steenis (New Guinea)
- Nothofagus cliffortioides (Hook.f.) Oerst. (New Zealand North, New Zealand South)
- Nothofagus codonandra (Hook.f.) Oerst. (New Caledonia)
- Nothofagus crenata Steenis (New Guinea)
- Nothofagus cunninghamii (Hook.f.) Oerst. (Tasmania, Victoria)
- Nothofagus discoidea (Baum.-Bod.) Steenis (New Caledonia)
- Nothofagus dombeyi (Mirb.) Oerst. (Argentina South, Chile Central, Chile South)
- Nothofagus flaviramea Steenis (New Guinea)
- Nothofagus fusca (Hook.f.) Oerst. (New Zealand North, New Zealand South)
- Nothofagus glauca (Phil.) Krasser (Chile Central)
- Nothofagus grandis Steenis (New Guinea)
- Nothofagus gunnii (Hook.f.) Oerst. (Tasmania)
- Nothofagus macrocarpa (A.DC.) F.M.Vázquez & R.A.Rodr. (Chile Central)
- Nothofagus menziesii (Hook.f.) Oerst. (New Zealand North, New Zealand South)
- Nothofagus moorei (F.Muell.) Krasser (New South Wales, Queensland)
- Nothofagus nitida (Phil.) Krasser (Chile South)
- Nothofagus nuda Steenis (New Guinea)
- Nothofagus obliqua (Mirb.) Oerst. (Argentina South, Chile Central, Chile South)
- Nothofagus perryi Steenis (New Guinea)
- Nothofagus pseudoresinosa Steenis (New Guinea)
- Nothofagus pullei Steenis (New Guinea)
- Nothofagus pumilio (Poepp. & Endl.) Krasser (Argentina South, Chile Central, Chile South)
- Nothofagus resinosa Steenis (New Guinea)
- Nothofagus rubra Steenis (New Guinea)
- Nothofagus rutila Ravenna (Chile Central)
- Nothofagus solandri (Hook.f.) Oerst. (New Zealand North, New Zealand South)
- Nothofagus starkenborghiorum Steenis (Bismarck Archipelago, New Guinea)
- Nothofagus stylosa Steenis (New Guinea)
- Nothofagus truncata (Colenso) Cockayne (New Zealand North, New Zealand South)
- Nothofagus womersleyi Steenis (New Guinea)
- Nothofagus × apiculata (Colenso) Cockayne (New Zealand North, New Zealand South)
- Nothofagus × blairii Kirk (New Zealand North, New Zealand South)
- Nothofagus × leoni Espinosa (Chile Central)
- Nothofagus × solfusca Allan (New Zealand North)

=== Subgenera ===
Four subgenera are recognized, based on morphology and DNA analysis:

- Subgenus Fuscospora, six species (N. alessandri, N. cliffortioides, N. fusca, N. gunnii, N. solandri, and N. truncata) in New Zealand, Tasmania, and southern South America.
- Subgenus Lophozonia, seven species (N. alpina, N. cunninghamii, N. glauca, N. macrocarpa, N. menziesii, N. moorei, and N. obliqua) in New Zealand, Australia, and southern South America.
- Subgenus Nothofagus, five species (N. antarctica, N. betuloides, N. dombeyi, N. nitida, and N. pumilio) in southern South America.
- Subgenus Brassospora (or Trisyngyne), 20 accepted species (N. aequilateralis, N. balansae, N. baumanniae, N. brassii, N. carrii, N. codonandra, N. crenata, N. discoidea, N. flaviramea, N. grandis, N. nuda, N. perryi, N. pseudoresinosa, N. pullei, N. recurva, N. resinosa, N. rubra, N. starkenborghiorum, N. stylosa, and N. womersleyi) in New Guinea and New Caledonia.

Further reinforcing the four-clade model is their reproductive isolation from each other—naturally occurring and cultivated Nothofagus have been recorded only between species of the same subgenus. Fuscopora, Lophozonia, and the Nothofagus subgenus often grow side-by-side, with plenty of opportunities to hybridize. Endemic to Papua New Guinea and New Caledonia, Brossospora does not occur in areas with other subgenera.

In 2013, Peter Brian Heenan and Rob D. Smissen proposed splitting the genus into four, turning the four recognized subgenera into the new genera Fuscospora, Lophozonia and Trisyngyne, with the five South American species of subgenus Nothofagus remaining in genus Nothofagus. The two authors posited that the four clades have evolutionary equivalence with other Fagales genera, and that the morphological and molecular differences are pronounced enough to raise the subgenera a rank. The proposed new genera are not accepted at the World Checklist of Selected Plant Families.

=== Extinct species ===
The following additional species are listed as extinct:

- †Nothofagus australis (Argentina, Early Oligocene-Early Miocene)
- †Nothofagus balfourensis (Tasmania, Late Oligocene-Early Miocene)
- †Nothofagus beardmorensis (Antarctica, Late Pliocene)
- †Nothofagus bulbosa (Tasmania, Early Oligocene)
- †Nothofagus cethanica (Tasmania, Early Oligocene)
- †Nothofagus cooksoniae (Tasmania, Early Oligocene)
- †Nothofagus crenulata (Argentina, Mid Oligocene-Early Miocene)
- †Nothofagus cretacea (Antarctica, Late Cretaceous)
- †Nothofagus densinervosa (Argentina, Mid Oligocene-Early Miocene)
- †Nothofagus elongata (Argentina, Early Oligocene-Early Miocene)
- †Nothofagus glandularis (Tasmania, Mid Oligocene-Early Miocene)
- †Nothofagus glaucifolia (Antarctica, Late Cretaceous)
- †Nothofagus lanceolata (Argentina, Late Oligocene-Early Miocene)
- †Nothofagus lobata (Tasmania, Early Oligocene)
- †Nothofagus magelhaenica (Argentina, Early Oligocene-Early Miocene)
- †Nothofagus magellanica (Argentina, Late Oligocene-Mid Miocene)
- †Nothofagus maideni (Tasmania, Early Oligocene-Mid Miocene)
- †Nothofagus microphylla (Tasmania, Late Oligocene-Mid Miocene)
- †Nothofagus mucronata (Tasmania, Early Oligocene)
- †Nothofagus muelleri (New South Wales, Late Eocene)
- †Nothofagus novae-zealandiae (New Zealand, Mid-Late Miocene)
- †Nothofagus pachyphylla (Tasmania, Early Pleistocene)
- †Nothofagus palustris (New Zealand, Late Oligocene-Early Miocene)
- †Nothofagus peduncularis (Tasmania, Early Oligocene)
- †Nothofagus robusta (Tasmania, Early Oligocene)
- †Nothofagus serrata (Tasmania, Early Oligocene)
- †Nothofagus serrulata (Argentina, Mid Oligocene-Early Miocene)
- †Nothofagus simplicidens (Argentina, Mid Oligocene-Early Miocene)
- †Nothofagus smithtonensis (Tasmania, Early Oligocene)
- †Nothofagus tasmanica (Tasmania, Eocene-Early Oligocene)
- †Nothofagus ulmifolia (Antarctica, Late Cretaceous)
- †Nothofagus variabilis (Argentina, Oligocene)
- †Nothofagus zastawniakiae (Antarctica, Late Cretaceous)

=== Evolutionary history ===
Nothofagus first appeared in Antarctica during the early Campanian stage (83.6 to 72.1 million years ago) of the Late Cretaceous. During the Campanian Nothofagus diversified and became dominant within Antarctic ecosystems, with the appearance of all four modern subgenera by the end of the stage. Nothofagus shows a progressive decline in the Antarctic pollen record through the Maastrichtian, before substantially recovering after the Cretaceous-Paleogene boundary. Nothofagus persisted in Antarctica deep into the Cenozoic, despite the increasingly inhospitable conditions, with the final records from the late Neogene, around 15-5 million years old, which were small tundra-adapted prostrate shrubs, similar to Salix arctica (Arctic willow).

Nothofagus had already spread into Australia and New Zealand by the mid Campanian, and first appeared in southern South America during the late Campanian. During the Paleocene and Eocene their distribution in South America was mostly restricted to southern Patagonia, before reaching a peak abundance during the Miocene. Their distribution contracted westwards during the late Miocene due to the aridification of Patagonia.

Although the genus now mostly occurs in cool, isolated, high-altitude environments at temperate and tropical latitudes, the fossil record shows that it survived in climates that appear to be much warmer than those that Nothofagus now occupies.

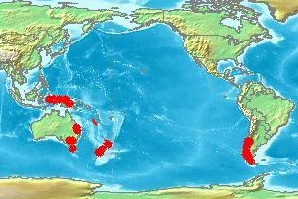
The Nothofagus plant genus illustrates the distribution on fragments of the old supercontinent Gondwana: Australia, New Guinea, New Zealand, New Caledonia, Argentina, and Chile.

== Distribution ==
The pattern of distribution around the southern Pacific Rim suggests the dissemination of the genus dates to the time when Antarctica, Australia, and South America were connected in a common land-mass or supercontinent referred to as Gondwana. More recent studies suggest that the Antarctic land bridge likely played a major role in the dispersal of the genus between these continents. However, genetic evidence using molecular dating methods has been used to argue that the species in New Zealand and New Caledonia evolved from species that arrived in these landmasses by dispersal across oceans. Uncertainty exists in molecular dates and controversy rages as to whether the distribution of Nothofagus derives from the break-up of Gondwana (i.e. vicariance), or if long-distance dispersal has occurred across oceans. In South America, the northern limit of the genus can be construed as La Campana National Park and the Vizcachas Mountains in the central part of Chile.

== Ecology ==
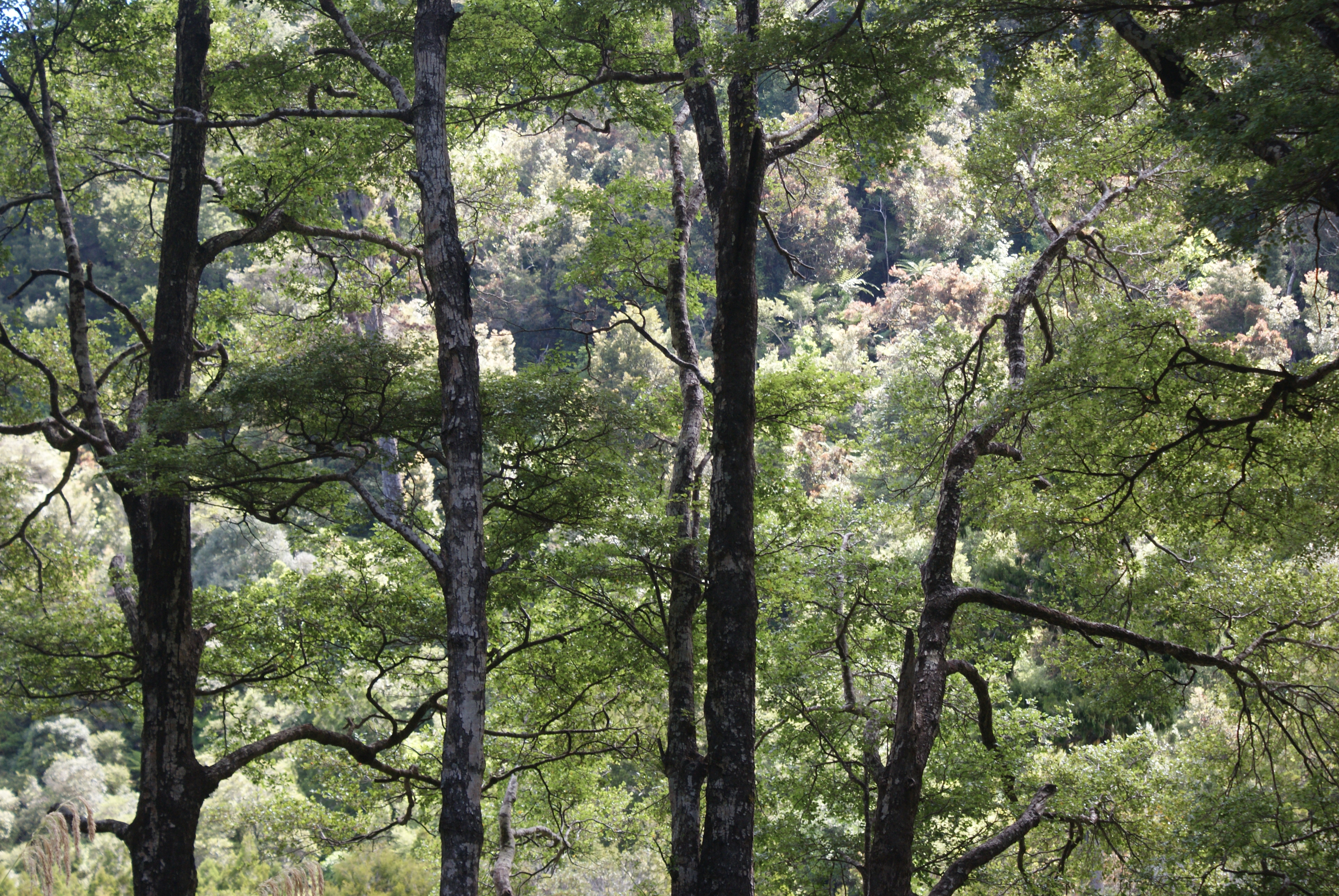
Southern beech trees in New Zealand

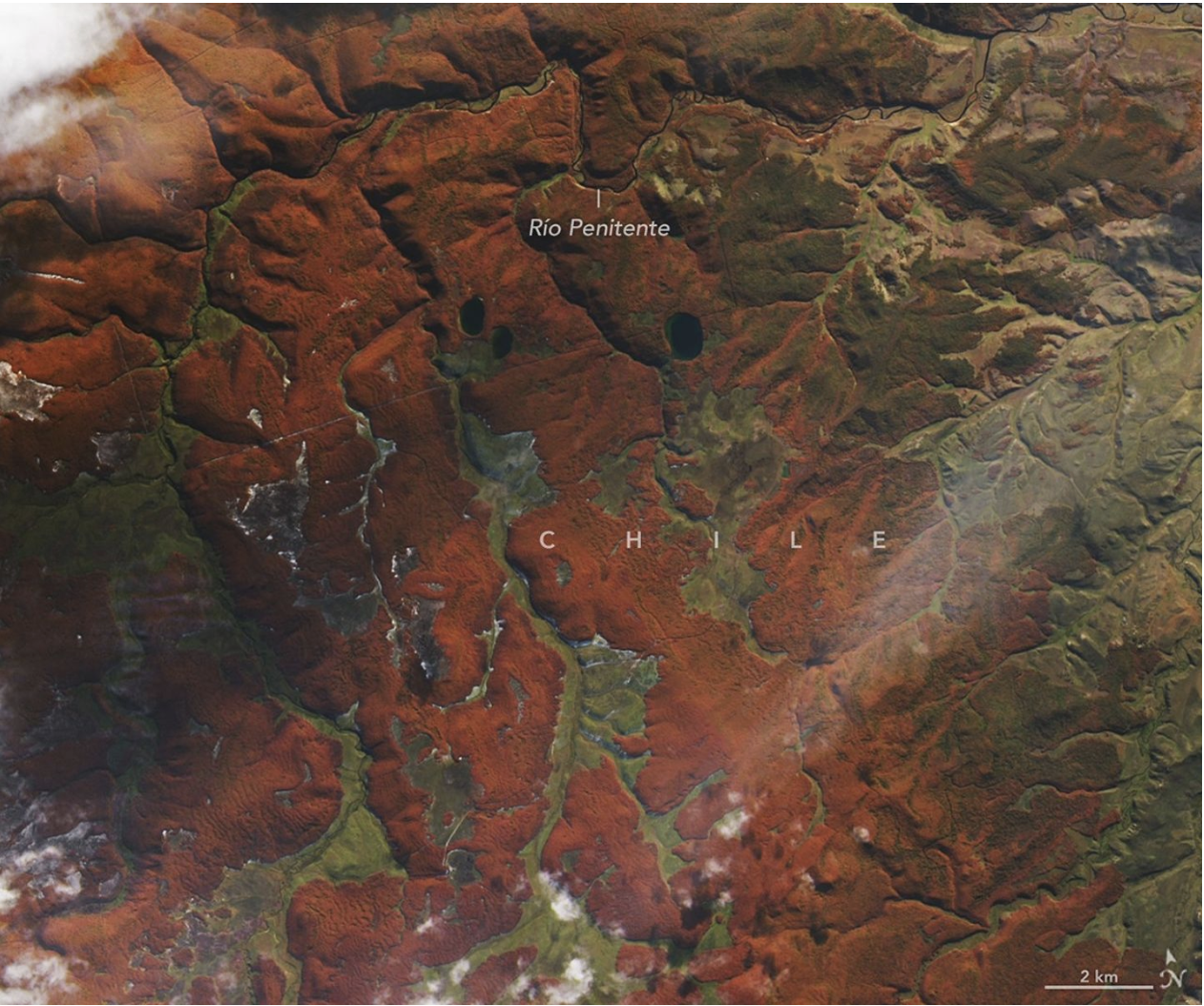
Beech forests in southern Chile are tinged orange in this image acquired by the OLI (Operational Land Imager) on Landsat 9 on April 12, 2026.

Nothofagus species are used as food plants by the larvae of hepialid moths of the genus Aenetus, including A. eximia and A. virescens. Zelopsis nothofagi is a leaf hopper, endemic to New Zealand, which is found on Nothofagus.

Cyttaria is genus of ascomycete fungi found on or associated with Nothofagus in Australia and South America. Misodendrum are specialist parasitic plants found on various species of Nothofagus in South America. Additionally, the beetle, Brachysternus prasinus, has been known to live in Nothofagus in Chile and in parts of Argentina. The geographic range of B. prasinus is highly dependent on the availability and distribution of Nothofagus on which B. prasinus is believed to feed. B. prasinus have been observed in the Nothofagus forests near the cities of Coquimbo and Llanquihue in Chile as well as the areas of Neuquén and Chubut in Western Argentina.

The species of subgenus Brassospora are evergreen, and distributed in the tropics of New Guinea, New Britain, and New Caledonia. In New Guinea and New Britain Nothofagus is characteristic of lower montane rain forests between 1,000 and 2,500 metres (3,300 and 8,200 ft) elevation, occurring infrequently at elevations as low as 600 m (2,000 ft), and in upper montane forests between 2,500 and 3,150 m (8,200 and 10,330 ft) elevation. Nothofagus is most commonly found above the Castanopsis-Lithocarpus zone in the lower montane forests, and below the conifer-dominated upper montane forests. Nothofagus grows in mixed stands with trees of other species or in pure stands, particularly on ridge crests and upper slopes. The Central Range has the greatest diversity of species, with fewer species distributed among the mountains of western and northern New Guinea, New Britain, and Goodenough and Normanby islands.

The New Caledonian species are endemic to the main island (Grand Terre), most commonly on soils derived from ultramafic rocks between 150 and 1,350 m (490 and 4,430 ft) elevation. They occur in isolated stands, forming a low or stunted and irregular and fairly open canopy. The conifers Agathis and Araucaria are sometimes present as emergents, rising 10 to 20 m (33 to 66 ft) above the Nothofagus canopy.

=== Beech mast ===
Every four to six years or so, Nothofagus produces a heavier crop of seeds and is known as the beech mast. In New Zealand, the beech mast causes an increase in the population of introduced mammals such as mice, rats, and stoats. When the rodent population collapses, the stoats begin to prey on native bird species, many of which are threatened with extinction.

=== Southernmost tree on earth ===
The southernmost tree in the world is reportedly an N. betuloides, living in a stand on the windswept island of Isla Hornos, at the southern edge of the Tierra del Fuego archipelago. It is believed to be 41.
