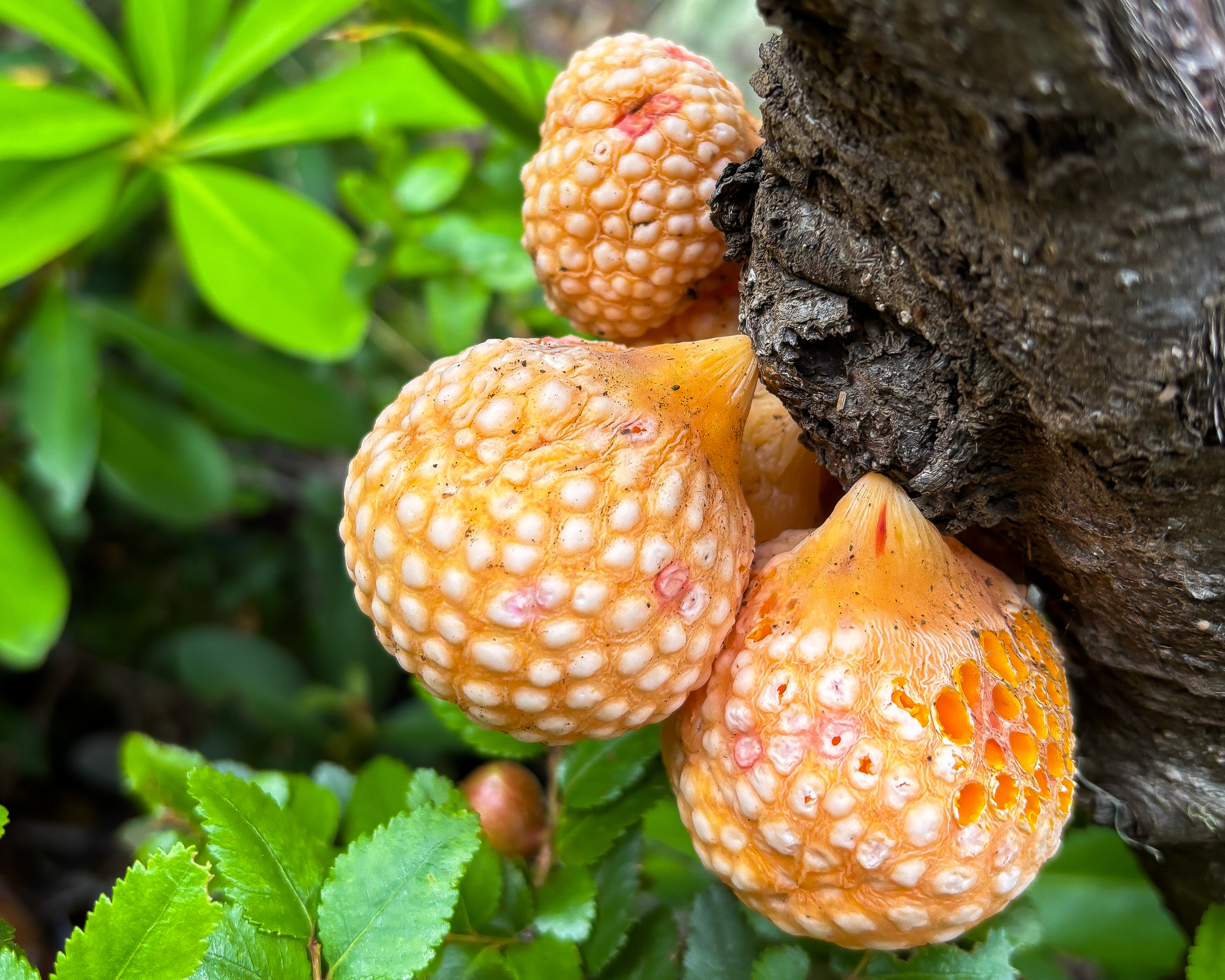
- Cyttaria espinosae

Scientific classification
- Kingdom: Fungi
- Division: Ascomycota
- Class: Leotiomycetes
- Order: Cyttariales
- Family: Cyttariaceae; Speg.

Genera
- Cyttaria; Cyttariella

= Cyttariaceae =

Cyttariacae is a family of ascomycete fungi. At least 14 species belong to the family Cyttariaceae.
