= Marcel Gustav Baumann-Bodenheim =

Swiss botanist

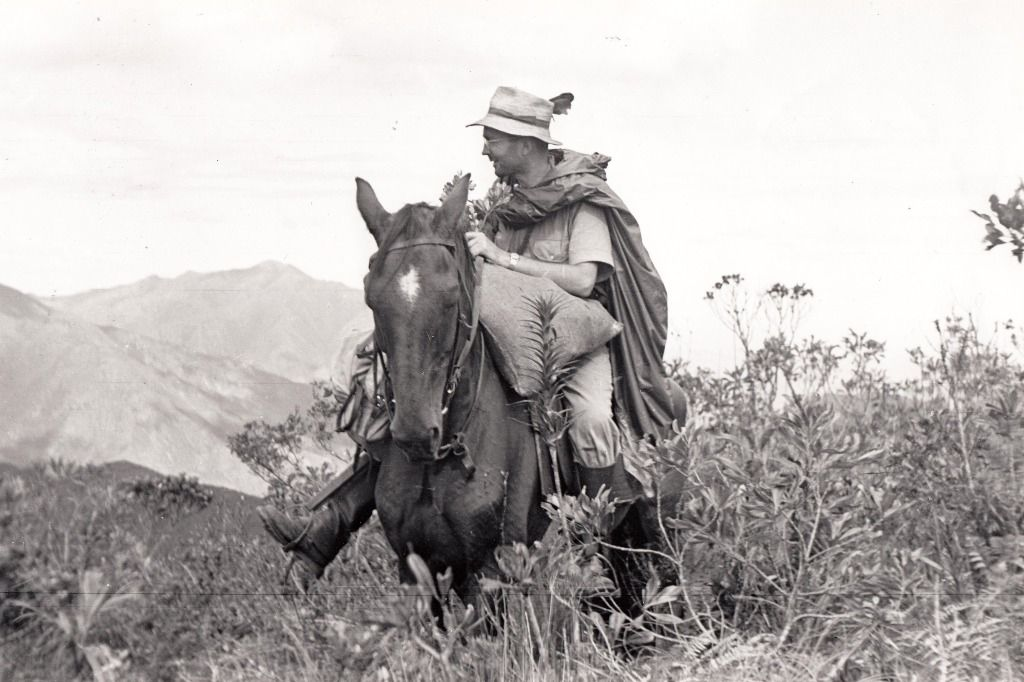
- Born: January 26, 1920
- Died: February 18, 1996 (aged 76)
- Citizenship: Switzerland
- Known for: Botanist in New Caledonia

Marcel Gustav Baumann-Bodenheim (January 26, 1920 – February 18, 1996) was a Swiss botanist. His botanical author abbreviation is "Baum.-Bod."

Baumann-Bodenheim was born January 26, 1920 in Baden in Germany the moved to Wettingen in Switzerland as a child and where he started studied to become a teacher. He then attended the University of Zurich from 1940 until 1945 where he studied biology and obtained his doctorate in botany.

He started his career in 1946 when he obtained a post as an exchange assistant at the National Herbarium of the Netherlands where he also met his wife to be.

He travelled with his family to New Caledonia an archipelago in the Pacific Ocean from 1950 until 1952 for a research expedition. He collected 80,000 specimens with around 15,500 herbarium specimens. The collection took many more years to process than to collect with many new genera and species being described. By 1988 he had complete the management of the collection and started working on producing the planted 24 volumes of Systematik der Flora von Neu-Caledonien. His collection was large enough that it has been distributed to the herbariums of over 15 university's world wide. He discovered five species of Nothofagus which filled in a gap in the know distribution between New Zealand and New Guinea. He later took up teaching biology at a secondary school in Zurich but continued to work on the flora of New Caledonia in his personal time.

He succumbed to Parkinson's disease and was forced to retire early and was bedbound for the last eight years of his life until his death February 18, 1996. He died at his home in Herrliberg. By his death he had completed 9 of his 24 planned volumes of Systematik der Flora von Neu-Caledonien.

== Plants ==
- Agathidaceae Baum.-Bod. ex A.V.Bobrov & Melikyan, Komarovia 4: 61 (2006).
- Bikkiopsis comptonii (S.Moore) Baum.-Bod., et Syst. Fl. Neu-Caledonien 5: 97 (May 1989), with basionym ref. (1989).
- Bikkiopsis comptonii (S.Moore) Baum.-Bod., Syst. Fl. Neu-Caledonien 4: 102 (1988 publ. Jan. 1989), without basionym ref.; (1989).
- Canacomyricaceae Baum.-Bod. ex Doweld, Byull. Moskovsk. Obshch. Isp. Prir., Otd. Biol. 105(5): 59 (2000) (2000).
- Cyclophyllum guillauminianum Baum.-Bod. ex Mouly & Jeanson, Acta Bot. Gallica Bot. Lett. 162(3): 176 (2015).
- Daenikeranthus Baum.-Bod., Syst. Fl. Neu-Caledonien 5: 76 (1989), nom. nov., without replaced synonym ref. (1989).
- Daenikeranthus alticola (Däniker) Baum.-Bod., Syst. Fl. Neu-Caledonien 5: 76 (1989), generic name not validly publ. (1989).
- Doga pancheri (Baill.) Baum.-Bod., Syst. Fl. Neu-Caledonien 5: 77 (1989).
- Durandea neocaledonica (Vieill.) Baum.-Bod., et Syst. Fl. Neu-Caledonien 5: 76, 98 (May 1989), with basionym ref. (1989).
- Durandea neocaledonica (Vieill.) Baum.-Bod., Syst. Fl. Neu-Caledonien 4: 103 (1988 publ. Jan. 1989), without basionym ref.; (1989).
- Eremopanax daenikeri Baum.-Bod., Ber. Schweiz. Bot. Ges. lxiv. 132 (1954).
- Eremopanax glaberrimus Baum.-Bod., Ber. Schweiz. Bot. Ges. lxiv. 131 (1954).
- Eremopanax hederoides Baum.-Bod., Ber. Schweiz. Bot. Ges. lxiv. 131 (1954).
- Exocarpos montanus (Stauffer) Baum.-Bod., Syst. Fl. Neu-Caledonien 5: 76 (1989): (1989).
- trib. Nothofageae Baum.-Bod., Syst. Fl. Neu-Caledonien 1: 104 (1992). (1992).
- Furcatella Baum.-Bod., et Syst. Fl. Neu-Caledonien 5: 98 (May 1989), without replaced synonym ref. (1989).
- Furcatella Baum.-Bod., Syst. Fl. Neu-Caledonien 4: 103 (1988 publ. Jan. 1989), nom. nov., without replaced synonym ref.; (1989).
- Furcatella rupicola (Baill.) Baum.-Bod., et Syst. Fl. Neu-Caledonien 5: 98 (May 1989), with basionym ref., generic name not validly publ.: (1989).
- Furcatella rupicola (Baill.) Baum.-Bod., Syst. Fl. Neu-Caledonien 4: 103 (1988 publ. Jan. 1989), without basionym ref.; (1989).
- Huperzia balansae (Herter) Baum.-Bod., Syst. Fl. Neu-Caledonien, see J. Holub in Folia Geobot. Phytotax. 7: 167 (1989).
- Melaleuca quinquenerva var. rubriflora (Vieill. ex Brongn. & Gris) Baum.-Bod., et Syst. Fl. Neu-Caledonien 5: 97 (May 1989), with basionym ref., basionym as 'M. leucadendron auct. non L. var. rubriflora': (1989).
- Melaleuca quinquenerva var. rubriflora (Vieill. ex Brongn. & Gris) Baum.-Bod., Syst. Fl. Neu-Caledonien 4: 102 (1988 publ. Jan. 1989), without basionym ref.; (1989).
- Metadacrydium Baum.-Bod. ex Melikyan & A.V.Bobrov, Bot. Zhurn. (Moscow & Leningrad) 85(7): 63 (2000).
- Metadacrydium Baum.-Bod., Syst. Fl. Neu-Caledonien 5: 76 (1989), nom. nov., without replaced synonym ref. (1989).
- Metadacrydium araucarioides Baum.-Bod. ex Melikyan & A.V.Bobrov, Bot. Zhurn. (Moscow & Leningrad) 85(7): 63 (2000).
- Metadacrydium araucarioides (Brongn. & Gris) Baum.-Bod., Syst. Fl. Neu-Caledonien 5: 76 (1989), generic name not validly publ.: (1989).
- Metadacrydium balansae Baum.-Bod. ex Melikyan & A.V.Bobrov, Bot. Zhurn. (Moscow & Leningrad) 85(7): 63 (2000).
- Metadacrydium balansae (Brongn. & Gris) Baum.-Bod., Syst. Fl. Neu-Caledonien 5: 76 (1989), generic name not validly publ.: (1989).
- Microsideros Baum.-Bod., Syst. Fl. Neu-Caledonien 5: 77 (1989), nom. inval.
- Microsideros tetrasticha (Guill.) Baum.-Bod., Syst. Fl. Neu-Caledonien 5: 77 (1989), without basionym page: (1989).
- Montrouziera sphaeroidea var. rhodoneura (Schltr.) Baum.-Bod., et Syst. Fl. Neu-Caledonien 5: 97 (May 1989), with basionym ref. (1989).
- Montrouziera sphaeroidea var. rhodoneura (Schltr.) Baum.-Bod., Syst. Fl. Neu-Caledonien 4: 102 (1988 publ. Jan. 1989), without basionym ref.; (1989).
- Nothofagus subsect. Molischia (Krasser) Baum.-Bod., Syst. Fl. Neu-Caledonien 1: 94 (1992), basionym ref. not clearly indicated: (1992).
- Nothofagus subgen. Pumilio (Steenis) Baum.-Bod., Syst. Fl. Neu-Caledonien 1: 93 (1992): (1992).
- Nothofagus subsect. Saccofagus Baum.-Bod., Syst. Fl. Neu-Caledonien 1: 93 (1992). (1992).
- Nothofagus eymae (Steenis) Baum.-Bod., Syst. Fl. Neu-Caledonien 1: 112 (1992), as 'eumea', without basionym ref. (1992).
- Oreothamnus Baum.-Bod., Syst. Fl. Neu-Caledonien 5: 76 (1989), without latin descr. or type. (1989).
- Oreothamnus amabilis (Brongn. & Gris) Baum.-Bod., Syst. Fl. Neu-Caledonien 5: 76 (1989), generic name not validly publ. (1989).
- Oreothamnus cosmelioides (Panch. ex Oliver) Baum.-Bod., Syst. Fl. Neu-Caledonien 5: 76 (1989), generic name not validly publ. (1989).
- Oreothamnus ramosus (Panch. ex Brongn. & Gris) Baum.-Bod., et Syst. Fl. Neu-Caledonien 5: 76, 97 (May 1989), with basionym ref., generic name not validly publ. (1989).
- Oreothamnus ramosus (Panch. ex Brongn. & Gris) Baum.-Bod., Syst. Fl. Neu-Caledonien 4: 102 (1988 publ. Jan. 1989), without basionym ref.; (1989).
- Pleiosyngyne Baum.-Bod., Syst. Fl. Neu-Caledonien 1: 86 (1992), without latin descr. or type. (1992).
- Pleiosyngyne alessandri (Espinosa) Baum.-Bod., Syst. Fl. Neu-Caledonien 1: 86 (1992), without basionym ref. (1992).
- Podocarpus caespitosus (Brongn. & Gris) Baum.-Bod., Syst. Fl. Neu-Caledonien 5: 76 (1989): (1989).
- Quadrangula Baum.-Bod., et Syst. Fl. Neu-Caledonien 5: 97 (May 1989), without replaced synonym ref. (1989).
- Quadrangula Baum.-Bod., Syst. Fl. Neu-Caledonien 4: 102 (1988 publ. Jan. 1989), nom. nov., without replaced synonym ref.; (1989).
- Quadrangula chamaecyparis (J.Poiss.) Baum.-Bod., et Syst. Fl. Neu-Caledonien 5: 97 (May 1989), without basionym page: (1989).
- Quadrangula chamaecyparis (J.Poiss.) Baum.-Bod., Syst. Fl. Neu-Caledonien 4: 102 (1988 publ. Jan. 1989), without basionym ref.; (1989).
- Quadrangula deplancheana (Miq.) Baum.-Bod., et Syst. Fl. Neu-Caledonien 5: 97 (May 1989), without basionym page: (1989).
- Quadrangula deplancheana (Miq.) Baum.-Bod., Syst. Fl. Neu-Caledonien 4: 102 (1988 publ. Jan. 1989), without basionym ref.; (1989).
- Sarcodrimys (Baill.) Baum.-Bod., et Syst. Fl. Neu-Caledonien 5: 97 (May 1989), without basionym ref. (1989).
- Sarcodrimys (Baill.) Baum.-Bod., Syst. Fl. Neu-Caledonien 4: 102 (1988 publ. Jan. 1989), without basionym ref.; (1989).
- Sarcodrimys crassifolium (Baill.) Baum.-Bod., et Syst. Fl. Neu-Caledonien 5: 97 (May 1989), with basionym ref., generic name invalid: (1989).
- Sarcodrimys crassifolium (Baill.) Baum.-Bod., Syst. Fl. Neu-Caledonien 4: 102 (1988 publ. Jan. 1989), without basionym ref.; (1989).
- Schefflera revolutissima Baum.-Bod., Syst. Fl. Neu-Caledonien 5: 77, 67 (1989), without latin descr. or type (1989).
- Scleroglossum koealagoguambaense Baum.-Bod., Syst. Fl. Neu-Caledonien 7: 167 (1989).
- Stravadium neocaledonicum (Vieill.) Baum.-Bod., Syst. Fl. Neu-Caledonien 5: 76 (1989): (1989).
- Thiollierea campanulata (Brongn.) Baum.-Bod., Syst. Fl. Neu-Caledonien 5: 77 (1989): (1989).
- Thiollierea fritillarioides (Schltr.) Baum.-Bod., et Syst. Fl. Neu-Caledonien 5: 98 (May 1989), with basionym ref. (1989).
- Thiollierea fritillarioides (Schltr.) Baum.-Bod., Syst. Fl. Neu-Caledonien 4: 103 (1988 publ. Jan. 1989), without basionym ref.; (1989).
- Thiollierea macrophylla (Brongn.) Baum.-Bod., et Syst. Fl. Neu-Caledonien 5: 98 (May 1989), with basionym ref. (1989).
- Thiollierea macrophylla (Brongn.) Baum.-Bod., Syst. Fl. Neu-Caledonien 4: 102 (1988 publ. Jan. 1989), without basionym ref.; (1989).
- Trisyngyne ser. Balansae Baum.-Bod., Syst. Fl. Neu-Caledonien 1: 110 (1992), without latin descr. or type. (1992
- Trisyngyne ser. Baumanniae Baum.-Bod., Syst. Fl. Neu-Caledonien 1: 110 (1992), without latin descr. or type. (1992).
- Trisyngyne subsect. Carri Baum.-Bod., Syst. Fl. Neu-Caledonien 1: 112 (1992). (1992).
- Trisyngyne subgen. Papuofagus Baum.-Bod., Syst. Fl. Neu-Caledonien 1: 111 (1992), without type. (1992).
- Trisyngyne subsect. Papuofagus Baum.-Bod., Syst. Fl. Neu-Caledonien 1: 112 (1992). (1992).
- Trisyngyne sect. Papuofagus Baum.-Bod., Syst. Fl. Neu-Caledonien 1: 113 (1992). (1992).
- Trisyngyne sect. Trisyngynopsis Baum.-Bod., Syst. Fl. Neu-Caledonien 1: 113 (1992). (1992).
- Trisyngyne aequilateralis Baum.-Bod., Bull. Mus. Natl. Hist. Nat. sér. 2, 25: 421 (1953).
- Trisyngyne balansae Baill. & Baum.-Bod., Bull. Mus. Natl. Hist. Nat. sér. 2, 25: 420, descr. ampl. (1953).
- Trisyngyne baumanniae Baum.-Bod., Bull. Mus. Natl. Hist. Nat. sér. 2, 25: 420 (1953).
- Trisyngyne brassii (Steenis) Baum.-Bod., Syst. Fl. Neu-Caledonien 1: 113 (1992), as 'brassi', without basionym page: (1992).
- Trisyngyne carrii (Steenis) Baum.-Bod., Syst. Fl. Neu-Caledonien 1: 112 (1992), as 'carri', basionym ref. not clearly indicated: (1992).
- Trisyngyne codonandra Baill. & Baum.-Bod., Bull. Mus. Natl. Hist. Nat. sér. 2, 25: 420, descr. ampl. (1953).
- Trisyngyne cornuta (Steenis) Baum.-Bod., Syst. Fl. Neu-Caledonien 1: 112 (1992), without basionym page: (1992).
- Trisyngyne crenata (Steenis) Baum.-Bod., Syst. Fl. Neu-Caledonien 1: 113 (1992), without basionym page: (1992).
- Trisyngyne decipiens (Steenis) Baum.-Bod., Syst. Fl. Neu-Caledonien 1: 112 (1992), without basionym ref. (1992).
- Trisyngyne discoidea Baum.-Bod., Bull. Mus. Natl. Hist. Nat. sér. 2, 25: 420 (1953).
- Trisyngyne dura (Steenis) Baum.-Bod., Syst. Fl. Neu-Caledonien 1: 112 (1992), without basionym ref. (1992).
- Trisyngyne flaviramea (Steenis) Baum.-Bod., Syst. Fl. Neu-Caledonien 1: 112 (1992), as 'flavoramea', without basionym page: (1992).
- Trisyngyne grandis (Steenis) Baum.-Bod., Syst. Fl. Neu-Caledonien 1: 113 (1992), without basionym page: (1992).
- Trisyngyne microphylla (Steenis) Baum.-Bod., Syst. Fl. Neu-Caledonien 1: 113 (1992), without basionym ref. (1992).
- Trisyngyne nuda (Steenis) Baum.-Bod., Syst. Fl. Neu-Caledonien 1: 113 (1992), without full basionym ref. (1992).
- Trisyngyne perryi (Steenis) Baum.-Bod., Syst. Fl. Neu-Caledonien 1: 113 (1992), without basionym page: (1992).
- Trisyngyne pseudoresinosa (Steenis) Baum.-Bod., Syst. Fl. Neu-Caledonien 1: 112 (1992), basionym ref. not clearly indicated: (1992).
- Trisyngyne pullei (Steenis) Baum.-Bod., Syst. Fl. Neu-Caledonien 1: 112 (1992), basionym ref. not clearly indicated: (1992).
- Trisyngyne recurva (Steenis) Baum.-Bod., Syst. Fl. Neu-Caledonien 1: 113 (1992), without basionym page: (1992).
- Trisyngyne resinosa (Steenis) Baum.-Bod., Syst. Fl. Neu-Caledonien 1: 112 (1992), without basionym page: (1992).
- Trisyngyne rubra (Steenis) Baum.-Bod., Syst. Fl. Neu-Caledonien 1: 112 (1992), without basionym page: (1992).
- Trisyngyne starkenborghiorum (Steenis) Baum.-Bod., Syst. Fl. Neu-Caledonien 1: 113 (1992), nom. inval.
- Trisyngyne womersleyi (Steenis) Baum.-Bod., Syst. Fl. Neu-Caledonien 1: 112 (1992), without full basionym ref. (1992).
