= Cornelis Gijsbert Gerrit Jan van Steenis =

Dutch botanist (1901–1986)

- Born: 31 October 1901
- Died: 14 May 1986 (aged 84)
- Education: Utrecht University
- Scientific career
- Fields: Botany
- Workplaces: Bogor Botanical Gardens, Flora Malesiana Foundation, Royal Tropical Institute Amsterdam, National Herbarium of the Netherlands
- Author abbrev. (botany): Steenis

Cornelis Gijsbert Gerrit Jan van Steenis (31 October 1901 – 14 May 1986) was a Dutch botanist. Van Steenis wrote many publications on the flora of the Maritime Southeast Asia region, among others about taxonomy and plant geography. Besides his expeditions in the Malay region, he also traveled in Australia and New Zealand.

== Biography ==
Van Steenis attended high school in Utrecht from 1915 to 1920. He obtained his masters and PhD at the University of Utrecht in 1925 and 1927, respectively. From 1927 to 1946, Van Steenis was botanist at the herbarium of 's Lands Plantentuin at Buitenzorg (now Bogor).

From 1935 to 1942, he was co-editor of De Tropische Natuur, the magazine of the Dutch East Indian Natural History Society. From 1946 to 1949 he was active in the Netherlands. In 1948 and 1950, he took up Heinrich Zollinger's 1857 recognition of Malesia as a floristic region in the Paleotropical kingdom, and expanded it. Van Steenis suggested and then organized Flora Malesiana, a description of the flora of Malesia.

From 1950 until his death in 1986, he was director of the Flora Malesiana Foundation. In 1951, he was appointed professor of tropical botany and plant geography on behalf of the Royal Tropical Institute in Amsterdam. From 1953 he was a professor in these subjects at the University of Leiden. From 1962 to 1972 he was professor and director of the National Herbarium of the Netherlands as a successor of Herman Johannes Lam. Van Steenis was succeeded in this position by Kees Kalkman.

On 5 June 1950 he was elected a corresponding member of the Royal Netherlands Academy of Arts and Sciences, but cancelled his membership on 1 December of that year. He was also a corresponding member of the Botanical Society of America. Elected a Foreign Member of the Linnean Society in 1960.

The Van Steenis Building of the University of Leiden, the Rubiaceae genus Steenisia, and the street Cornelis van Steenishof in Oegstgeest are named after him.
