= Flaming drink =

Mixed alcoholic drink set ablaze for show

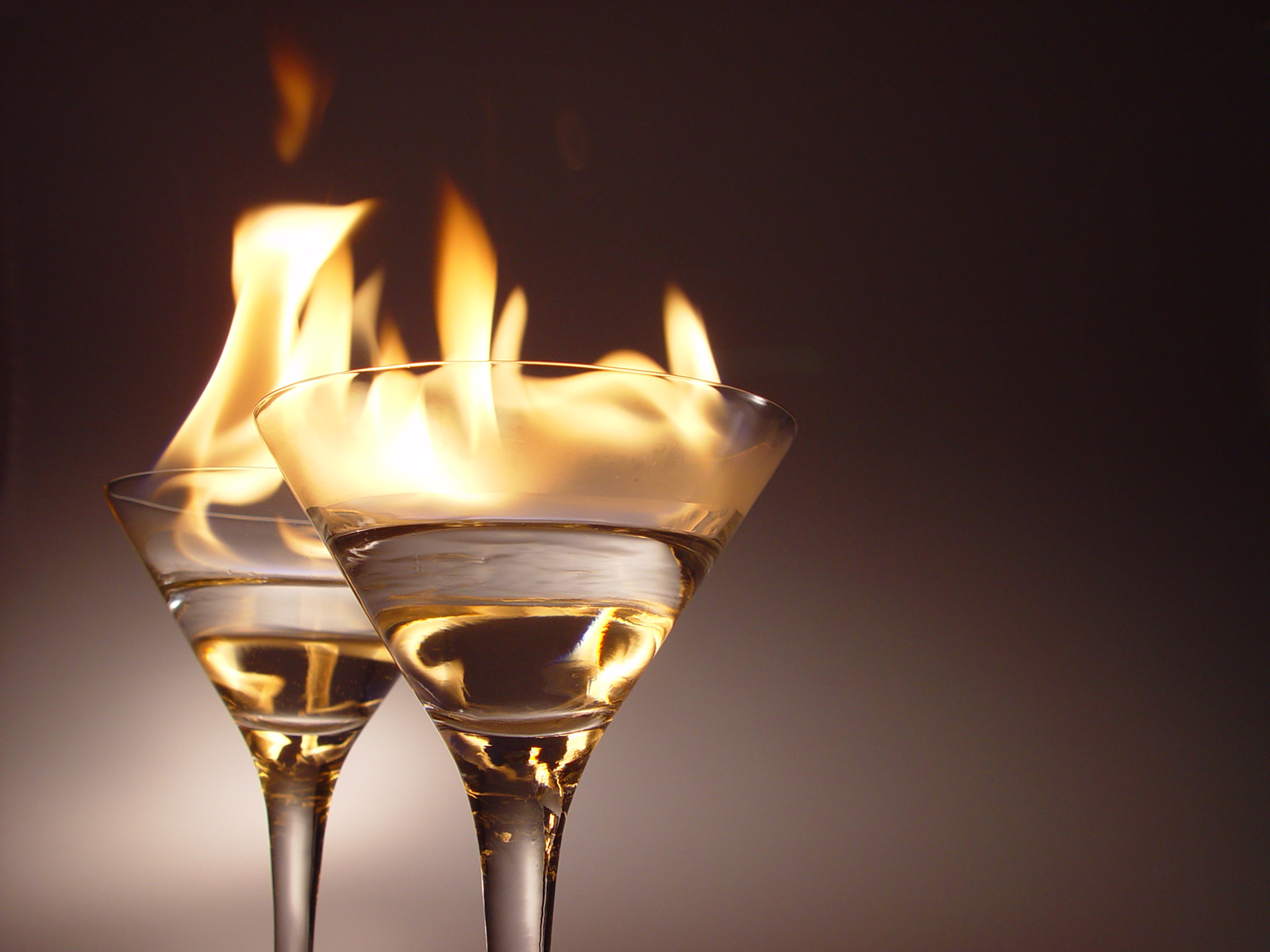
Flaming cocktails

A flaming drink is a cocktail or other mixed drink that contains flammable, high-proof alcohol, which is ignited before consumption. The alcohol may be an integral part of the drink, or it may be floated as a thin layer across the top of the drink. The flames are mostly for dramatic flair. However, in combination with certain ingredients, the flavor of the drink is altered. Some flavors are enhanced, and the process may impart a toasted flavor to some drinks.

== History ==
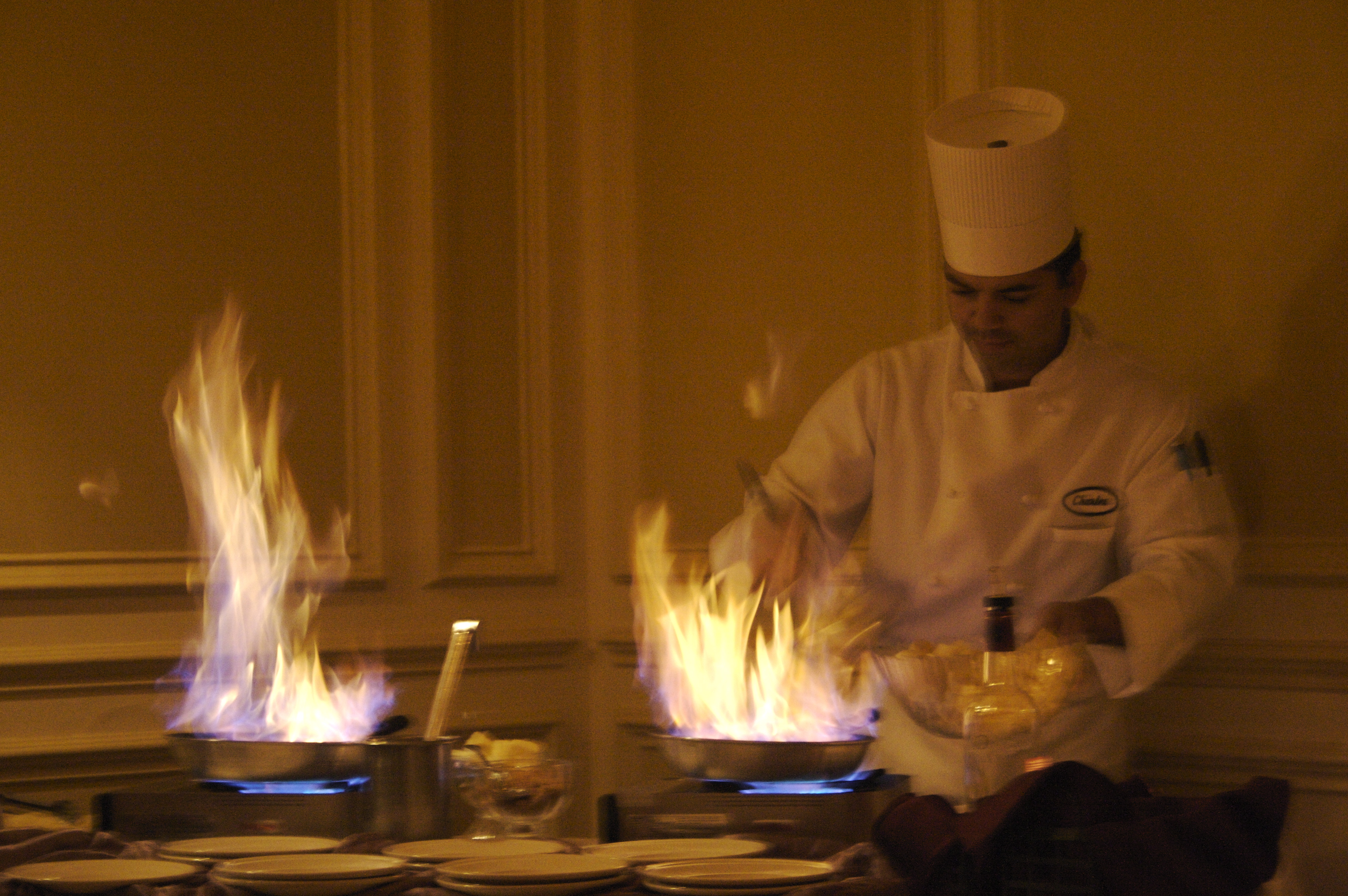
A chef preparing Crêpe Suzette

While alcohol has historically been both consumed as a drink and used as fuel for fire, the first instance of a flaming alcoholic drink is uncertain.

Many traditional recipes for food incorporate flaming alcohol as a key process or ingredient. This method of cooking is usually referred to as flambé. Bananas Foster, cherries jubilee, bombe Alaska, crêpe Suzette, steak Diane, and coq au vin are a few well-known dishes that utilize this method for both imparting complex flavors in the food and, in the case of all but the last, a spectacle performed at the tableside. During the Victorian era, flaming steamed puddings became a tradition.

=== Early drinks ===
In the mid-1800s, a typical saloon would serve basic spirits, such as whiskey, brandy, or gin. For a sweet variation, a little sugar might be added. For special occasions and depending on availability of the ingredients, various punches, toddies, egg nogs, grogs, or mulled wines might be provided, especially at social events. Somewhere between at least the 1600s and the 1860s, people began to light the alcohol on fire.

=== Blue blazer cocktail ===
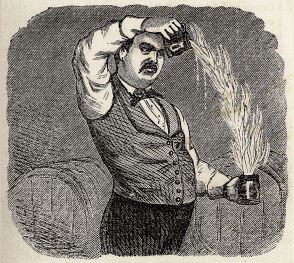
Jerry Thomas, the author of the first book with cocktail recipes

The first bartender's manual, written by Jerry Thomas and published in 1862, contains the recipe for the first flaming cocktail, the blue blazer. The book, How to Mix Drinks, describes how to turn a hot toddy made with Scotch into a "blazing stream of liquid fire":

197. Blue Blazer.
(Use two large silver-plated mugs, with handles.)

1 wine-glass of Scotch whisky.
1 do. Boiling water.
Put the whisky and the boiling water in one mug, ignite the liquid with fire, and while blazing mix both ingredients by pouring them four or five times from one mug to the other, as represented in the cut. If well done this will have the appearance of a continued stream of liquid fire.
Sweeten with one teaspoonful of pulverized white sugar, and serve in a small bar tumbler, with a piece of lemon peel.

The "blue blazer" does not have a very euphonious or classic name, but it tastes better to the palate than it sounds to the ear. A beholder gazing for the first time upon an experienced artist, compounding this beverage, would naturally come to the conclusion that it was a nectar for Pluto rather than Bacchus. The novice in mixing this beverage should be careful not to scald himself. To become proficient in throwing the liquid from one mug to the other, it will be necessary to practise for some time with cold water.

== Safety ==
Bars have been shut down specifically due to failure to follow fire codes and reckless endangerment of patrons. Bartenders have also suffered burns from flaming drinks.

== Flair bartending ==
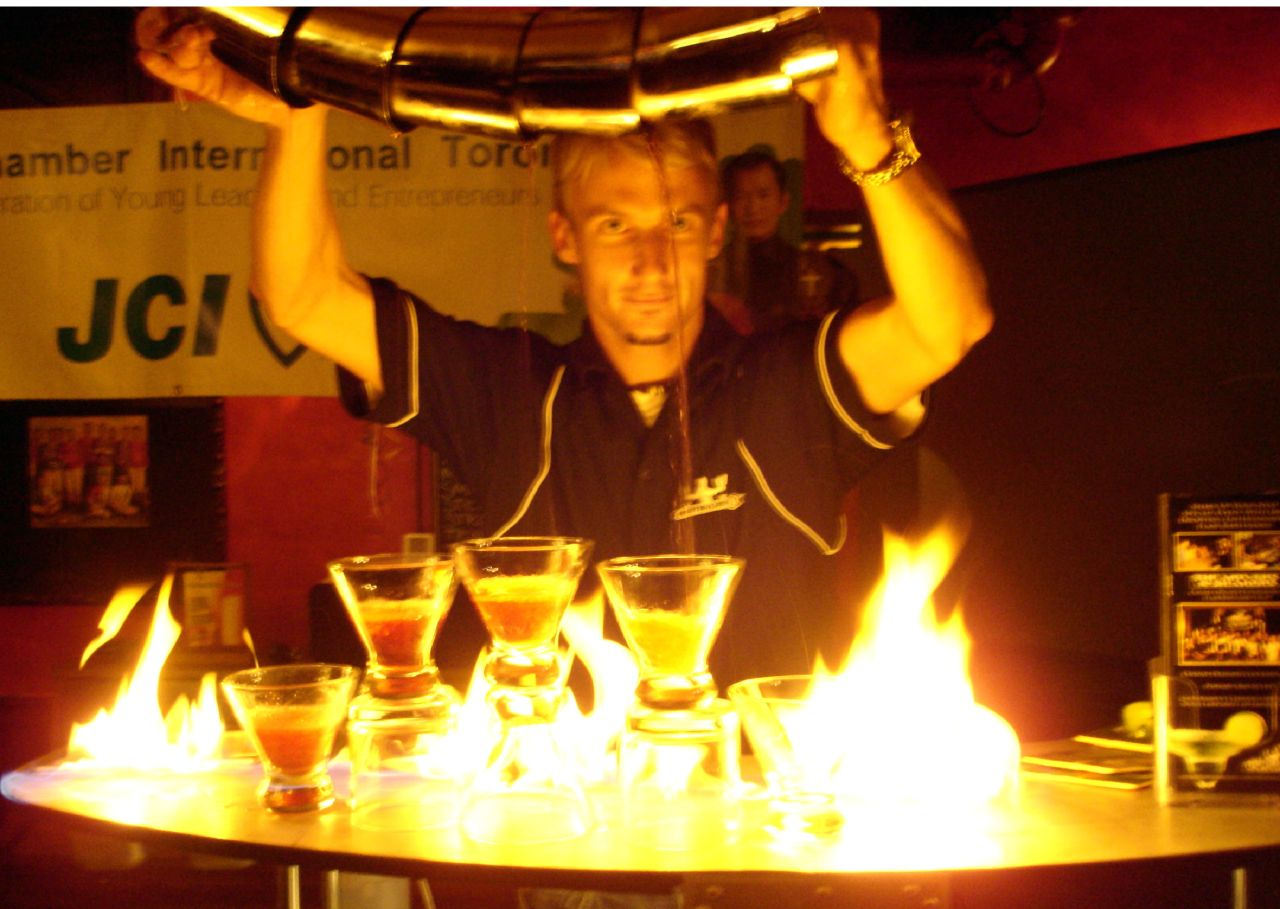
A man pouring five flaming martinis at the same time

The art of preparing mixed drinks with style and pizazz, as opposed to simply pouring sedately from a bottle, is referred to as flair bartending. A little flair, such as a quick flip or spin of a bottle, is a fairly common way for bartenders to impress patrons and enhance the drinking experience. However, preparing a flaming drink for a patron represents a significantly escalated level of flair. Bars and nightclubs that specialize in this style of bartending tend to develop reputations for it, and people visit the establishment as much for the show as they do for the drinks.

=== Flamed orange twist ===
The skin of most citrus fruits, especially oranges and lemons, contains flammable volatile oils. When a slice of peel is squeezed over a drink above a flame, such as from a match or a lighter, the resulting spray passes through the flame and is slightly caramelized and produces a sparkle effect. Any change in flavor is subtle, but the act of setting a spray of orange oil is performance more than culinary enhancement. This technique can be done anytime a twist of citrus is called for in a drink recipe; however, drinks with stronger flavors are better for this than delicate ones. Since, after squeezing, the peel will be rubbed around the edge of the glass and then placed in the drink, it is best to use very clean fruits. Also, the fresher the fruit, the more oil there will be within the skin.

=== Flaming fruit shells ===
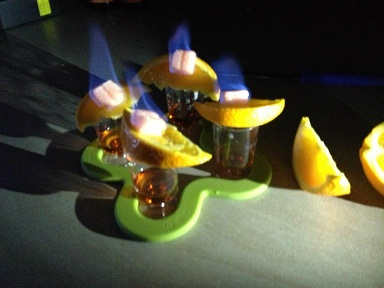
Stroh rum soaked sugar cubes in orange shells

A lemon, lime, or small orange is cut in half, hollowed out, and then typically floated inside an ornate tiki bowl filled with mixed liquors and fruit juices (such as a scorpion bowl group cocktail), or simply placed inside a large brandy snifter. A small amount of overproof rum (45% ABV or greater) is then poured into the hollowed out shell and carefully set on fire.

Placing a sugar cube inside the shell helps in two ways. First, it acts as a wick to present a better flame, and secondly, it adds weight to the shell and helps to prevent it from tipping into the drink. The caramelized sugar cube is edible if it is not burned too badly. A fruit shell with flaming sugar may also be placed on a drink for presentation or for delaying the lighting of flaming shots. A smaller fruit slice or peel may also be used instead of a citrus half, especially if the slice is meant to be bitten into after drinking the alcohol; small fireproof dishes may also be used.

=== Absinthe ===
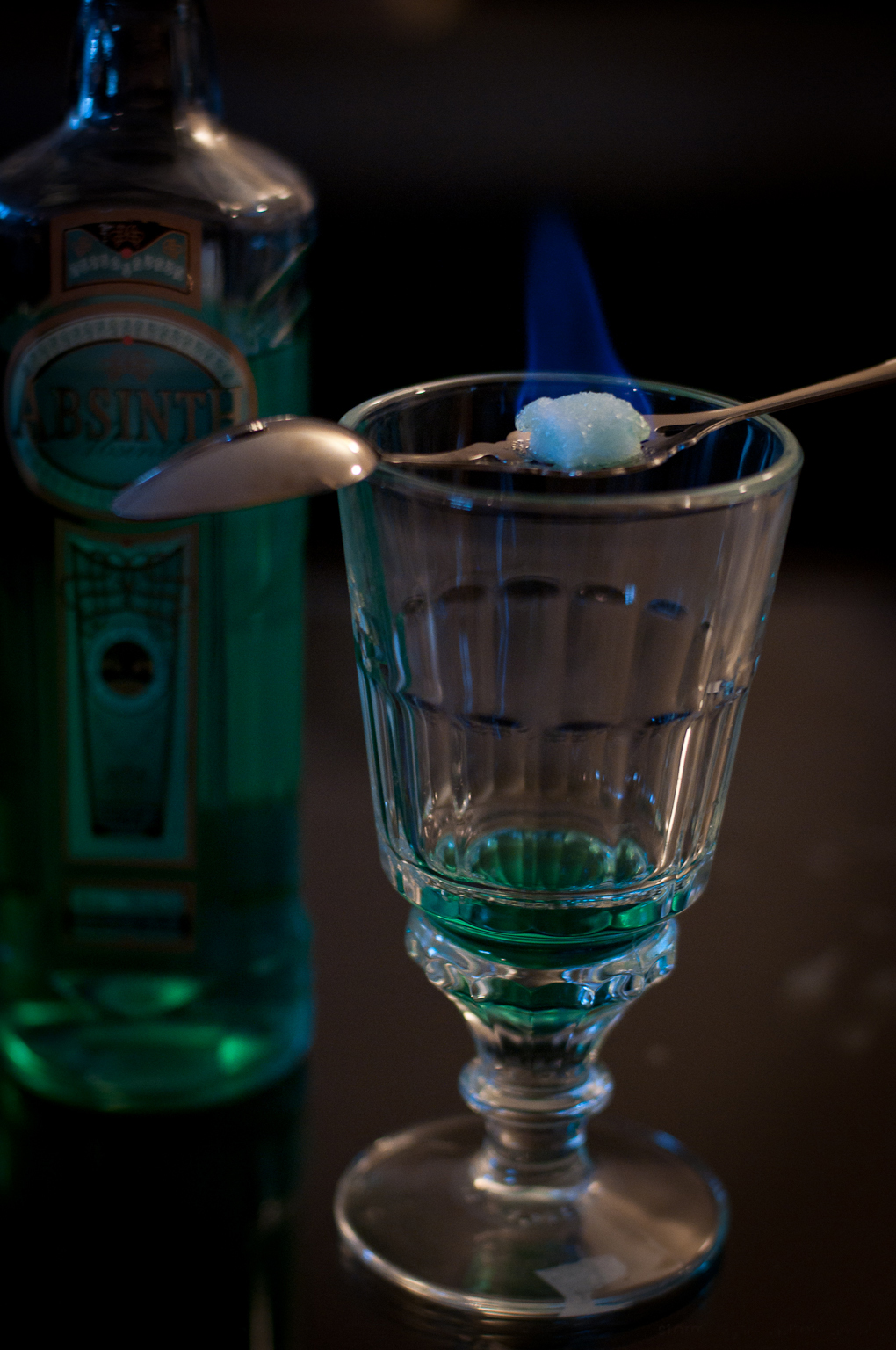
Absinth Stromu — the Bohemian ritual can also ignite the drink if flaming sugar drips in.

Absinthe is traditionally prepared following the French ritual, in which sugar cubes are slowly dissolved into the absinthe by the pouring or dripping of ice-cold water over the cubes; the mixture of the water with the hydrophobic botanical oils in absinthe causes it to become cloudy, or louche. While this traditional method of preparation involves no flame, absinthe is a highly flammable liquor and is thus suitable for use in flaming cocktails.

An alternative, Bohemian (Czech) ritual involves fire, but does not (directly) ignite the actual drink itself. Instead of slowly dissolving the sugar with cold water, the sugar cube is doused in absinthe and lit on fire. This results in caramelized sugar dripping into the absinthe, which considerably changes the flavor. This fire ritual is a modern invention, originating in the 1990s and initially meant to distract from the fact that Czech absinthes of that era were often simply overproof vodkas with artificial coloring and flavoring. The pyrotechnic nature of the ritual has nevertheless resulted in a degree of enduring popularity even as the quality of such absinthes improved.

== Alcohols used ==
Many different liquors and combinations thereof can be used as ingredients in a flaming drink. In theory, any drink with 40% = 80 proof or more alcohol will ignite, although it takes at least 50% = 100 proof to produce a steady flame. This is a list only of ones mentioned in verifiable mainstream media sources. Any comments about liquors are attributed to the listed sources

- Absinthe
- Amaretto
- Cognac
- Everclear
- Gin – burns, but the flame is not as large as higher proof alcohols
- Grand Marnier – generally considered to have a pleasant smell while being burned
- Kahlúa
- Overproof rum (most commonly referred to as "Rum 151")
  - Bacardi 151 – burns especially clean and fast
  - Stroh 160 – high flammability and fragrant
- Poitín – traditionally burned.
- Sambuca – produces large blue flames and has a distinct aniseed smell.
- Scotch whisky
- Vodka – produces large blue flames.

Beer, with its high water content, is used in many cocktails both to quench flames and for flavor. For example, in the flaming Dr. Pepper, a flaming shot glass full of liquors is dropped into a large beer mug and immediately consumed.

== List of flaming drinks ==
There are many flaming drinks, and creative bartenders frequently invent new drinks and variations on existing drinks. This is a list only of drinks mentioned in verifiable mainstream media sources. Any comments about drinks are attributed to the listed sources.

- Absinthe
- Flaming B-52
- Blue blazer
- Flaming Dr. Pepper
- Flaming volcano, volcano bowl, or tiki love bowl
- Flaming zombie

== See also ==
- "Flaming Moe's"
- Feuerzangenbowle
- List of cocktails
