= Flaming Doctor Pepper =

Flaming cocktail

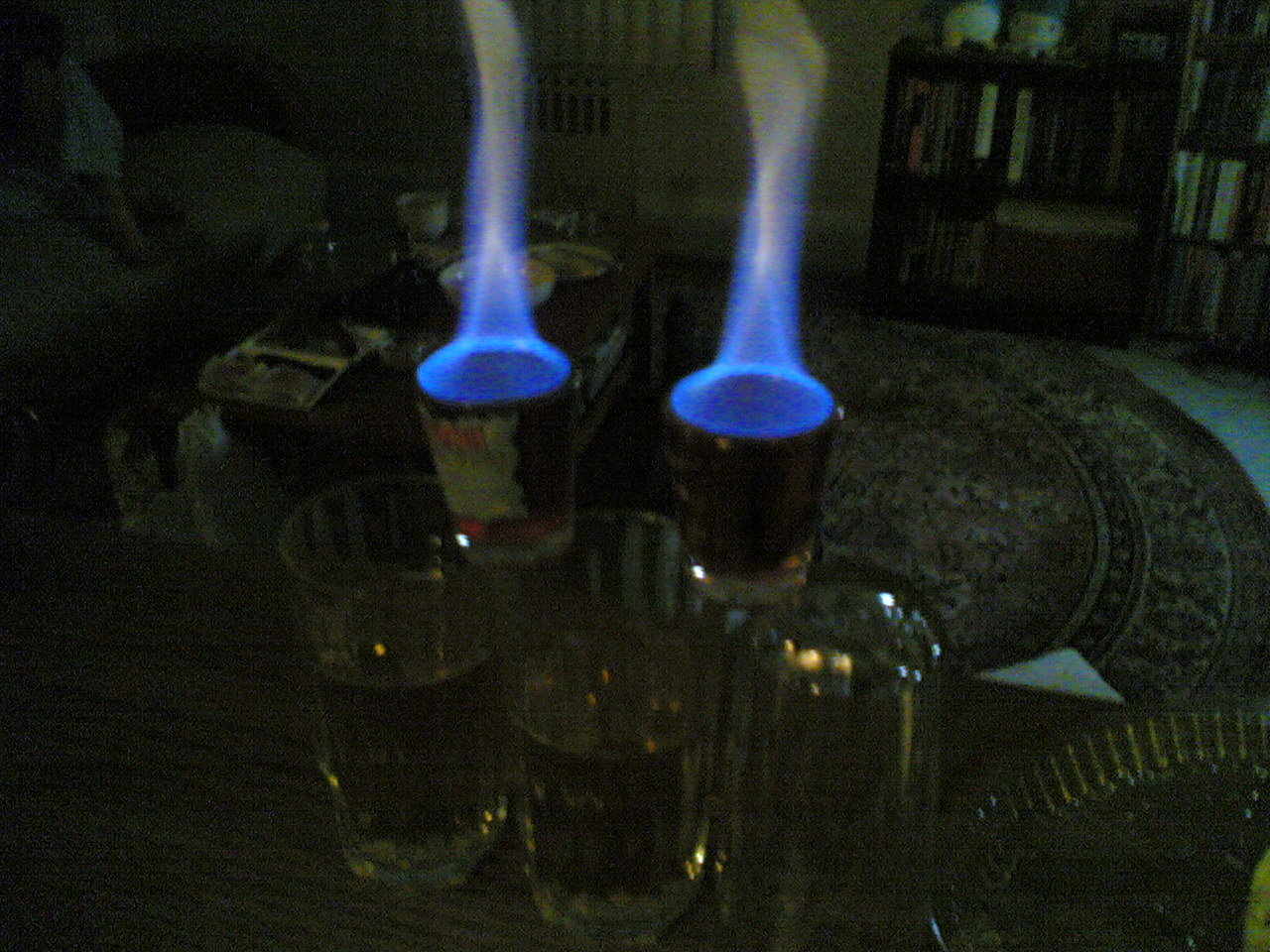
- Ingredients: 1 pint (~13 parts) beer; 3 parts Amaretto; 1 part high-proof liquor
- Base spirit: Beer, High-proof alcohol, Amaretto
- Standard drinkware: A pub glass and a shot glass.
- Preparation: Layer the two spirits in the shot glass, with the high-proof liquor on top. Light the shot and allow it to burn; then extinguish it by dropping it into the beer glass. Drink immediately.

A Flaming Doctor Pepper, or Flaming Dr Pepper, is a flaming cocktail with taste similar to the soft drink Dr Pepper, despite Dr Pepper not being one of its ingredients. Dave Brinks of the Gold Mine Saloon lays claim to inventing the drink.

== Preparation ==
It is usually made by filling a shot glass with 3 parts Amaretto and 1 part high-proof liquor, such as Everclear or Bacardi 151. The two liquors are not mixed; the high-proof alcohol is layered on top of the Amaretto. The shot is then set on fire and dropped into a glass half-filled with beer. The flames are extinguished by the beer, and the cocktail should then be drunk quickly.

== See also ==
- Bomb shot
- Cheeky Vimto
- Long Island iced tea
- Queen Mary (beer cocktail)
- Shooter (mixed drink)
