= Tableside service =

In the restaurant industry, tableside service may refer to:

- Service à la russe, where waiters portion and serve food from a sideboard or serving trolley
- Gueridon service, where waiters prepare foods on a gueridon trolley.
