= Cheeky Vimto =

Port and vodka cocktail

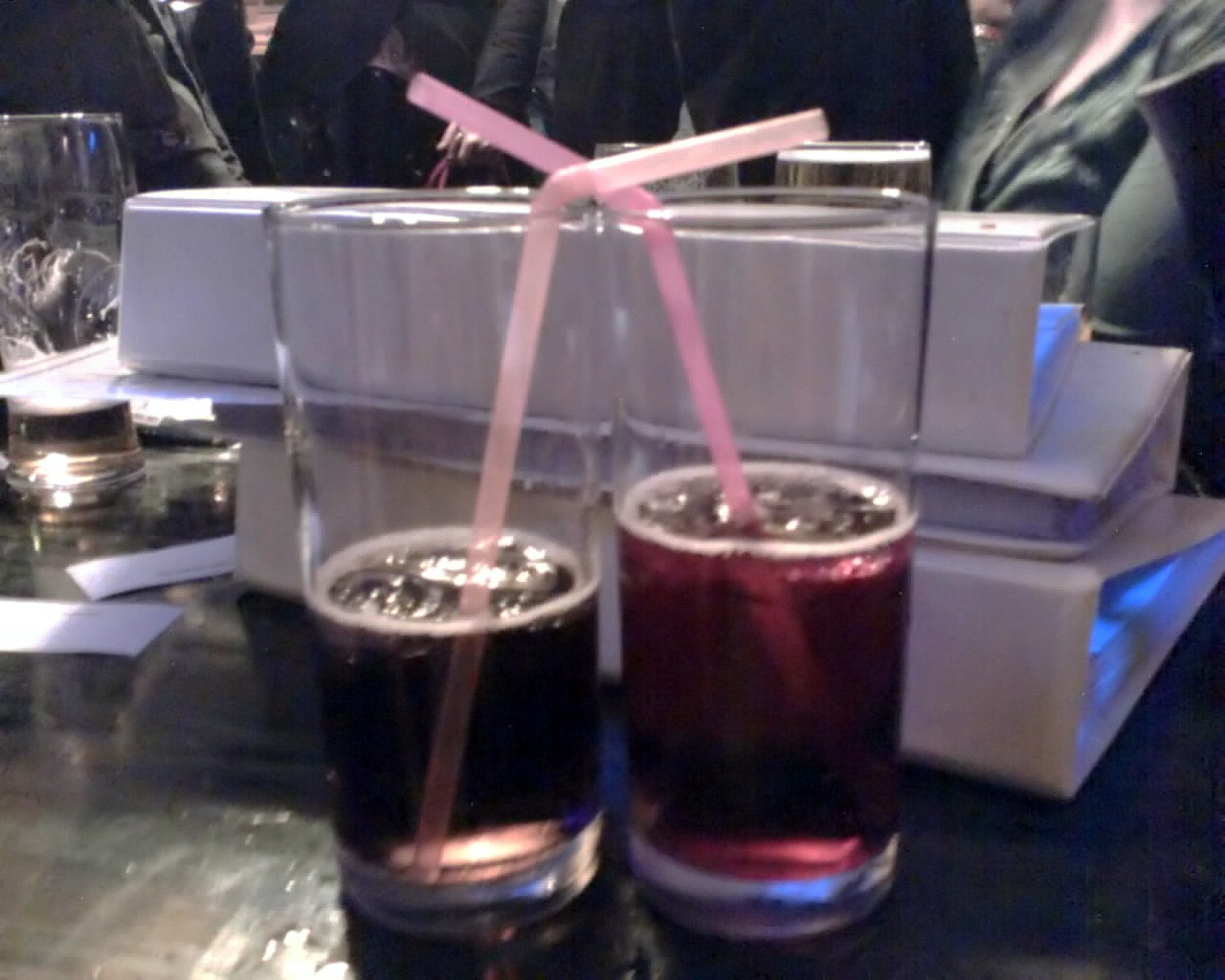
- Cheeky Vimto (left)
- Type: Mixed drink
- Ingredients: 275ml WKD Blue; 50ml port wine
- Standard drinkware: Pub glass
- Served: Neat or with ice

A Cheeky Vimto is an alcoholic drink cocktail with a taste similar to the soft drink Vimto, despite Vimto not being one of its ingredients.

== Preparation ==
The cocktail is made up of port wine and WKD Blue. Though the owners of Vimto decided they would not manufacture an alcopop version, the company has encouraged its use as a mixer. Many establishments give the Cheeky Vimto other names in order to avoid breaching the trademark of the soft drink. A variation consisting of the port and WKD, without the Vimto, was described in Amy Winehouse's biography as one of her beverages of choice. In May 2018 WKD released a canned version of their drink called "Cheeky V", described as "Port Blue and Lemonade Flavour".

== See also ==
- Flaming Doctor Pepper – Flaming cocktail – another cocktail named after a commercial soft drink, which similarly does not contain that drink.
- Long Island iced tea – Mixed drink with vodka, gin, tequila, and rum – a cocktail named in reference to its visual resemblance to a non-alcoholic drink which is generally not used as an ingredient in the cocktail.
- List of cocktails
