= Joe Tea =

American food and beverage company

- Company type: Private
- Industry: Food and Beverage
- Founded: 1998
- Founder: Steven Prato
- Headquarters: Upper Montclair, NJ 07043
- Area served: International
- Key people: Steven Prato, CEO; Ann Prato
- Products: Iced tea Potato chips
- Website: www.joetea.com

Joe Tea is a producer of iced tea and potato chips founded in 1998 by Steven and Ann Prato and based in Montclair, New Jersey. The tea is known for its all-natural taste and retro logo.

== History ==
Steven and Ann Prato started Joe Tea in the summer of 1998 and sold the product to local stores in Hoboken and the Jersey Shore. The store expanded to wholesale distribution and in a few years supplied the New York metropolitan area.

By 2012, the company had expanded distribution to Chile, Japan, China, Korea, Indonesia, Brazil, Canada and Britain.

As of 2017, the company has expanded to over 20 countries worldwide.
