= Edoardo Tiretta =

Venetian nobleman, architect and landowner (1731–1809)

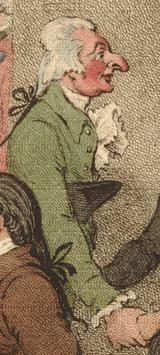
Caricature of Tiretta in The Bengal Levee, by James Gilray, 1792

Count Edoardo Tiretta (August 1731 – 15 March 1809), often anglicized to Edward Tiretta, was a Venetian nobleman, architect and landowner. Part of Giacomo Casanova's set in Paris, he moved to Calcutta in his forties, where he worked as a civil architect, building superintendent and land surveyor. He notably built Tiretta Bazaar, which became India's first Chinatown.

== Early life ==
Edoardo Tiretta was born in August 1731 in Trebaseleghe, in the modern-day Province of Padua, to a wealthy land-owning family. They owned a palace in Treviso, a villa in Montello, and numerous other properties in the countryside. He was educated as a mathematician and architect.

Having been discovered embezzling money from the mount of piety in his hometown of Treviso, he took refuge in France in order to escape the police, where he found himself nearly destitute. Tiretta arrived in Paris in 1757 at the age of twenty-five and was introduced to the infamous Giacomo Casanova, who described him thus:

In the beginning of March, 1757, I received a letter from my friend Madame Manzoni, which she sent to me by a young man of good appearance, with a frank and high-born air, whom I recognized as a Venetian by his accent. He was young Count Tiretta de Trevisa, recommended to my care by Madame Manzoni, who said that he would tell me his story, which I might be sure would be a true one.

— Giacomo Casanova, The Memoirs of Jacques Casanova de Seingalt, 1725–1798, Volume III: The Eternal Quest, "Episode XI: Paris and Holland", Chapter I

Casanova took Tiretta under his protection, offering him room and board; over the next few years, Tiretta would become his close friend and confidant. He shared Casanova's libertine lifestyle, seducing women for money; one of his many lovers nicknamed him "Count Six-Times" based on the number of times they had had sex in one night.

== Life in Calcutta ==
Following the loss of a favoured mistress, Tiretta decided to pursue his fortune in the East Indies. Sometime in the early 1770s, Tiretta acquired a clerical job in Batavia in the Dutch East Indies through Casanova's recommendation. However, Tiretta got involved in a scandal and fled to Calcutta, then a prominent East India Company city and capital of the Bengal Presidency. The details of the scandal are not known, although Casanova refers to it as "a revolt at Batavia" and that "[Tiretta] had only escaped the gallows by flight."

=== Public life ===
Tiretta would hold many roles in Calcutta over the years, including map-maker, Civil Architect of Calcutta, Superintendent of Roads, and building inspector. He also became a land-owner and businessman, earning a degree of affluence and prominence in the city. Systematic land registration was introduced in the Bengal Presidency by legislation of the Supreme Council of Bengal on 9 January 1781 and registered in the Supreme Court of Judicature at Fort William on 1 February 1781. Tiretta was appointed the first surveyor and registrar under this legislation, at a salary of 1000 sicca rupees.

Diarist William Hickey left the following account of Tiretta: "By birth he was an Italian, but had spent considerable portion of his life in France and Germany ... he had made no great proficiency in the English language ... it being perfectly ridiculous to hear the strange mélange had made when speaking ... a compound of English, French, Portuguese and Hindustani, interlarded with the most uncouth and outré oaths in each language." James Augustus Hicky, the founder of Hicky's Bengal Gazette, gave him the nickname of "Nosey Jargon" owing to his habit of prying into others' affairs.

=== Tiretta Bazaar ===
Around 1783, Tiretta was given permission to construct a "puckabazaar" in central Calcutta of an area comprising around nine bighas and eight cottahs of land, "with convenient shops, surrounded with a colonnade veranda": this is the eponymous Tiretta Bazaar. The bazaar became the nucleus of India's first Chinatown. However, Tiretta had a reversal of fortune over the next three years, verging on bankruptcy. He announced the sale of his bazaar as well as several other properties by lottery in the Calcutta Gazette on 2 December 1788. This "Tiretta's Lottery" consisted of six prizes; the bazaar was the first prize with a valuation of nearly two lakh sicca rupees. A gentleman by the name Charles Watson won the lottery for Tiretta Bazaar but opted to retain the old name.

=== Marriage and family ===
Tiretta married a teenaged French girl named Angelique Carrion (1778–1796), the orphaned daughter of a French officer from Chandernagore, at the age of 59. She died at the age of 18 giving birth to their daughter. Their daughter's name is recorded variously as Angelique—like her mother— and as Josephine.

In March 1797, he bought a plot of land on Park Street, and had his wife's remains reinterred there. This new cemetery was presented by Tiretta to the Roman Catholic community of Calcutta. This cemetery was razed in 1977 and Angelique's tomb was lost, although several other tombs were relocated to the South Park Street Cemetery. The land is occupied by a school.

The writer Giovanni Comisso wrote about his own ancestry: "Edoardo Tiretta from Treviso, my maternal ancestor, had participated in Casanova's life. I went to my grandmother, who was a Tiretta and was born in 1824 and I asked her if she remembered anything about this ancestor [...] My grandmother remembered in her childhood a relative of hers, called "the Indian", who went around Treviso dressed in green and must have been the daughter of [...] Edoardo."

== Retirement and death ==
On 31 August 1802, Tiretta wrote to Lord Wellesley, Governor-General of India, requesting permission to retire. His request was granted around October 1803, and he was also provided a pension of 532 rupees per month for life. Tiretta's assistant Richard Blechynden (great-grandfather of tea trader Richard Blechynden) succeeded him as land surveyor.

In 1807, Tiretta returned to Treviso with his daughter; his youthful crime was either forgotten or overlooked. He died there in March 1809 at the age of 77. His place of burial is unknown. Tiretta's will, written in London in 1806, is held at the UK National Archives.
