= Beniamino Schiavon =

Beniamino Schiavon (died 1968 in his 60s), generally known as Mr. Nino (of the Drake) was the maître d'hôtel of the Drake Hotel in New York City from 1942 until 1967. He was said to have created Steak Diane.

To celebrate his 25th anniversary of service at the Drake, two hundred regulars gave him a cocktail party; Perle Mesta called him "America's No. 1 Host" and J. Edgar Hoover sent a letter.

[I like] meeting people and table-hopping to find out what they like. It makes me happy to act as liaison between diners and the chef. I like to please people so they'll come back again.

— Mr. Nino

Schiavon was born in Padova, Italy, and worked as a busboy, waiter, and eventually captain at the Café Savoia (Padova), the Bauer-Grünwald Hotel (Venice), the Plaza Hotel (New York), and others. In 1942, he became the maître d'hôtel at the Hotel St. Moritz and then joined the Drake.

Steak Diane is often attributed to Schiavon, who was said to have created the dish with Luigi Quaglino at the Plage Restaurant in Ostend, Belgium, and named it after a "beauty of the nineteen-twenties" or perhaps "a reigning lady of the European demimonde in the nineteen twenties". But there are other candidates.

Schiavon presided over the Drake Room where he provided "impeccable service", and later over Shepheard's, the Drake's "elegant, Egyptified cafe".

Schiavon was a member of the Chevaliers du Tastevin.
