= Bananas Foster =

Dessert

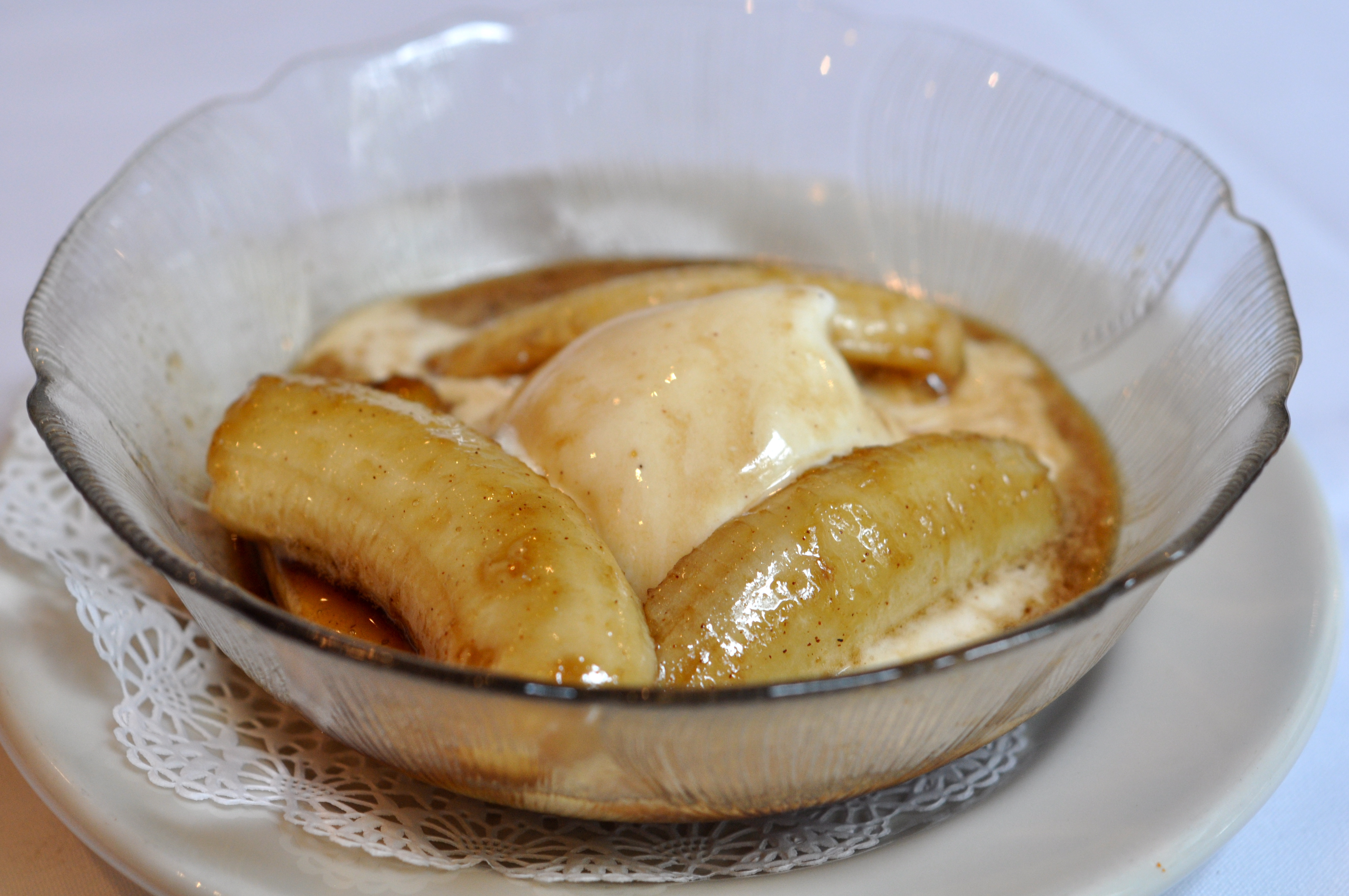
- Bananas Foster at Brennan's
- Course: Dessert
- Place of origin: United States
- Region or state: New Orleans, Louisiana
- Created by: Paul Blangé and Ella Brennan; Vieux Carré Restaurant
- Invented: 1951
- Main ingredients: Bananas, vanilla ice cream, butter, brown sugar, cinnamon, dark rum, banana liqueur

Bananas Foster is an American dessert made from bananas, with a sauce made from butter, brown sugar, cinnamon, dark rum, and banana liqueur. The butter, sugar and bananas are cooked, and then alcohol is added and ignited. The bananas and sauce are then often served over vanilla ice cream. Popular toppings also include whipped cream and different types of nuts (e.g., pecans, walnuts, etc.). The dish is often prepared tableside as a flambé.

== Preparation ==
Bananas Foster is made with cooked bananas served in a butter, brown sugar and rum sauce. The caramelized liquor-based sauce is often prepared via flambé. It may be served with vanilla ice cream or used as a crêpe filling. Cinnamon and nutmeg may be added as seasoning.

== History ==
The dish was created at the original location of Brennan's in New Orleans, Louisiana, when the restaurant was still known as Owen Brennan's Vieux Carré. In 1951, Ella Brennan and the restaurant's chef Paul Blangé worked together to modify a dish made by Ella's mother in the Brennan family home. At this time, New Orleans was a major hub for the import of bananas from South America. It was named for Richard Foster, the chairman of the New Orleans Crime Commission and a friend of restaurant owner Owen Brennan. In New Orleans, popular lore credits the introduction of flambéeing bananas to a relative of Empress Joséphine de Beauharnais of France.

Bananas foster were among the most popular desserts of the 1960s in the US. Flambéed dishes like cherries jubilee and steak Diane were in vogue, served at restaurants where they were appreciated for the way they combined spectacle with liqueur in food.

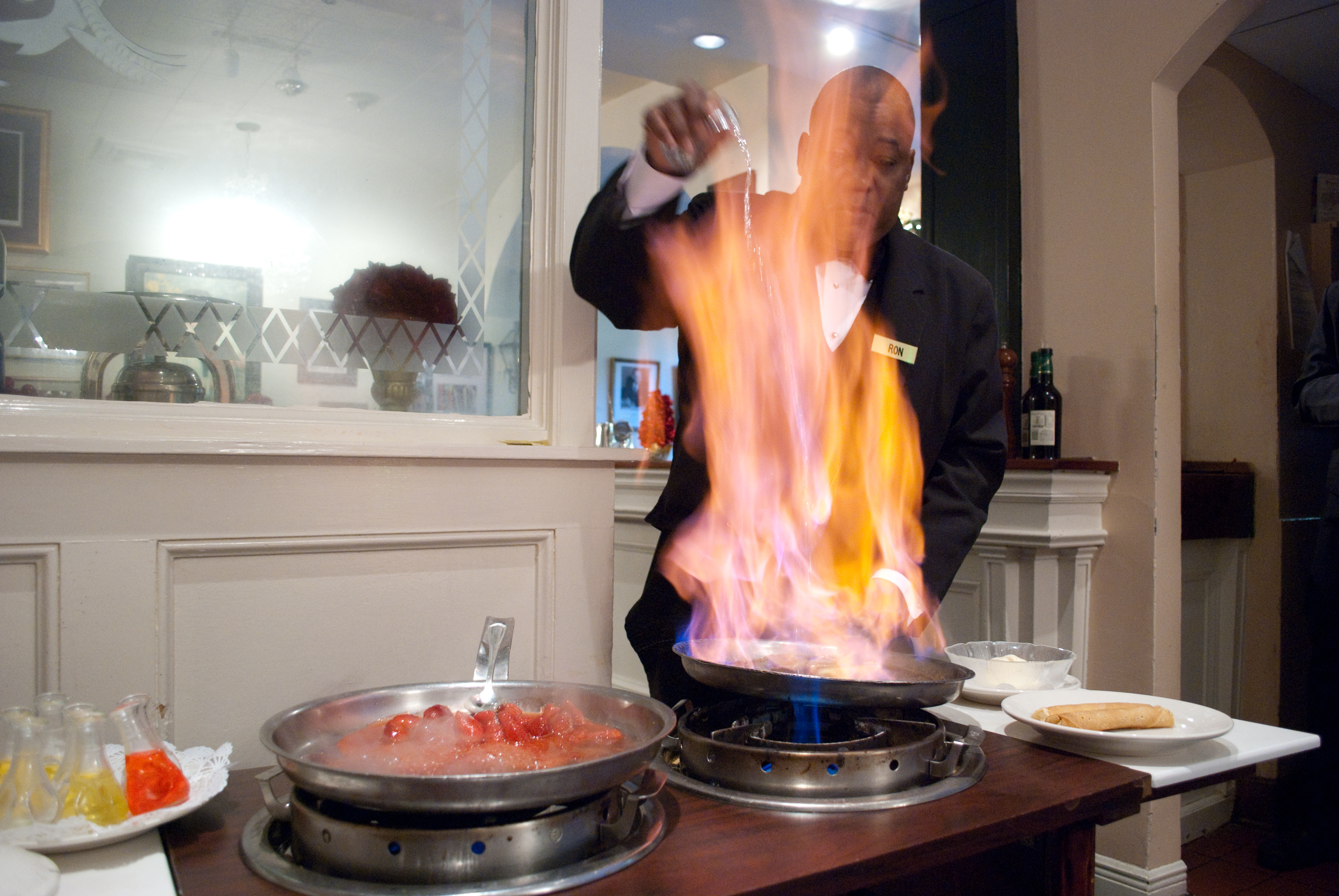
A waiter prepares bananas Foster at Brennan's

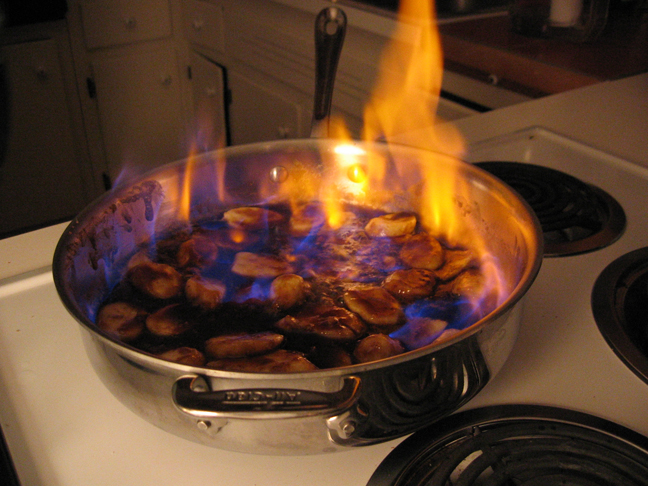
Bananas Foster includes a flambé.

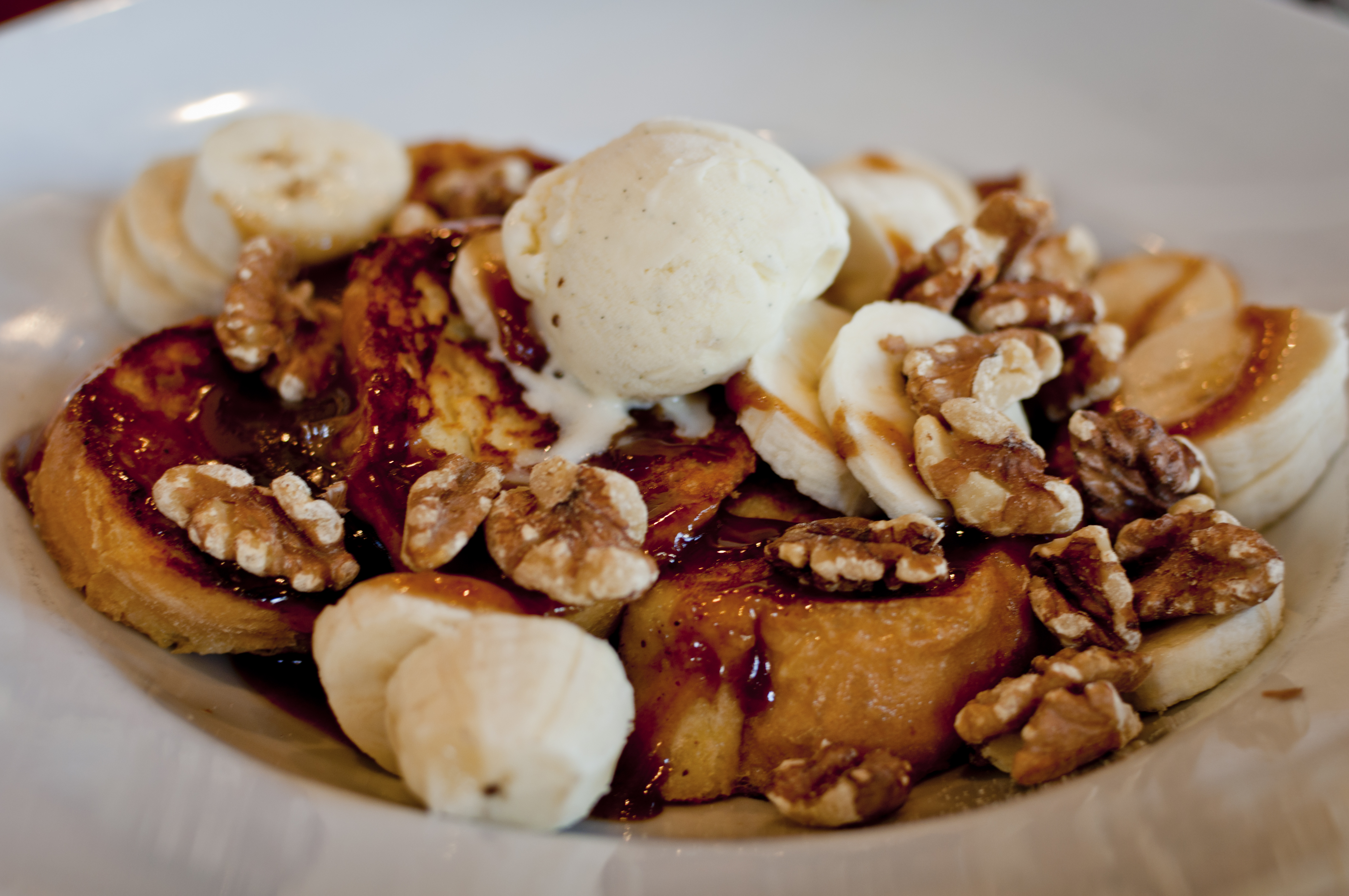
Bananas Foster French toast at a New Orleans restaurant

== See also ==
- Cherries jubilee
- Cuisine of New Orleans
- List of American desserts
- List of banana dishes
- Louisiana Creole cuisine
