= Cherries jubilee =

Dessert

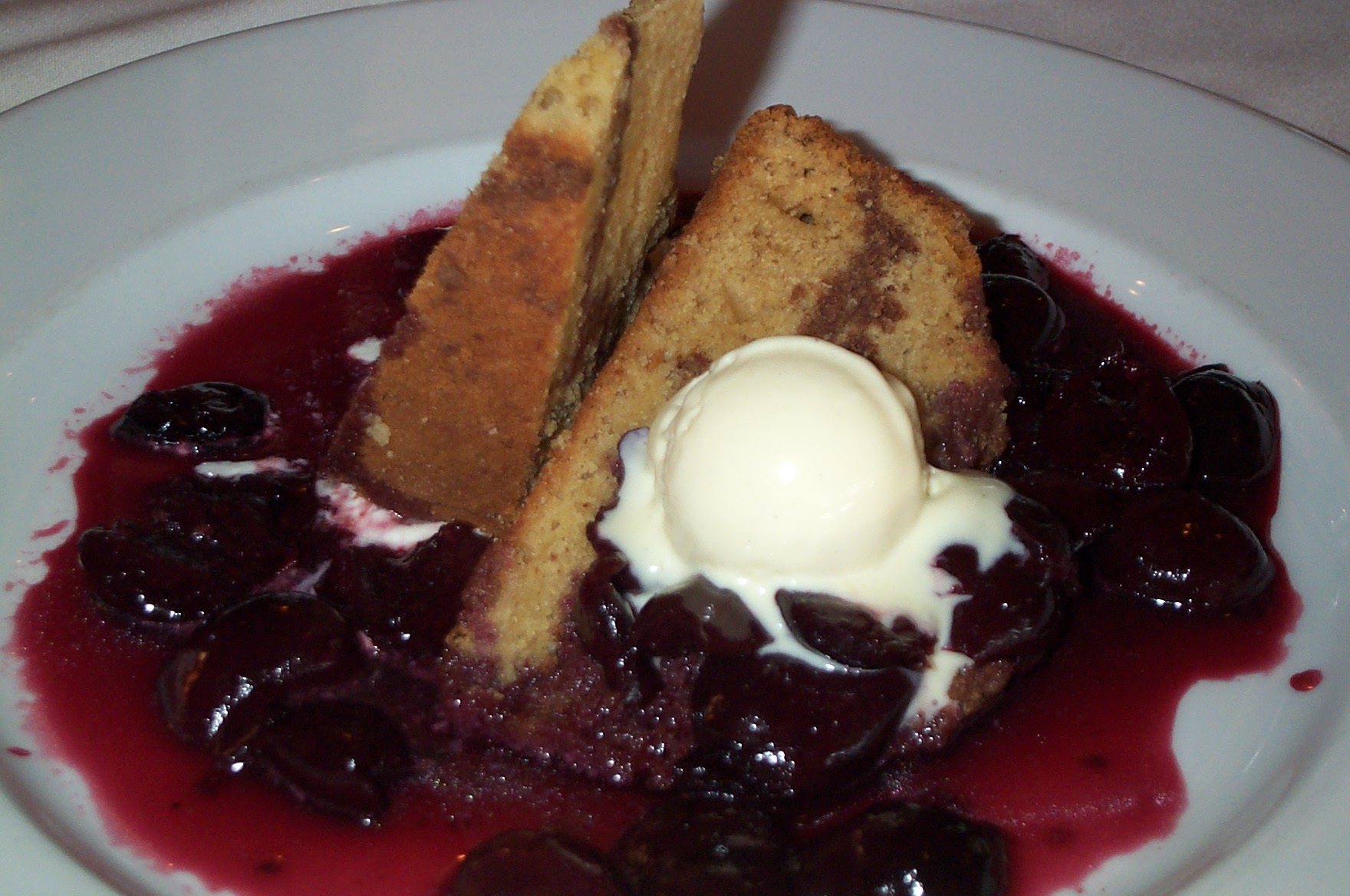
Cherries jubilee

Cherries jubilee is a dessert dish made with cherries and liqueur (typically kirschwasser), which are flambéed tableside, and commonly served as a sauce over vanilla ice cream.

The recipe is generally credited to Auguste Escoffier, who prepared the dish for one of Queen Victoria's Jubilee celebrations, widely thought to be the Diamond Jubilee in 1897.

== Similar dishes ==
Other flambéed fruit dishes include Bananas Foster, mangos diablo (mangos flambéed in tequila) and pêches Louis (peaches flamed in whiskey).

The Victoria sponge is another dessert paying homage to Queen Victoria, who was said to be fond of it. Other British dishes celebrate monarchs, including one for the Diamond Jubilee of Victoria's great-great-granddaughter Elizabeth II in 2022, the Platinum Pudding, as well as the coronation chicken (1953) and the coronation quiche (2023). Several versions of jubilee chicken also exist.

== See also ==
- List of cherry dishes
- List of desserts
- List of fruit dishes
