= Flambé =

Cooking procedure

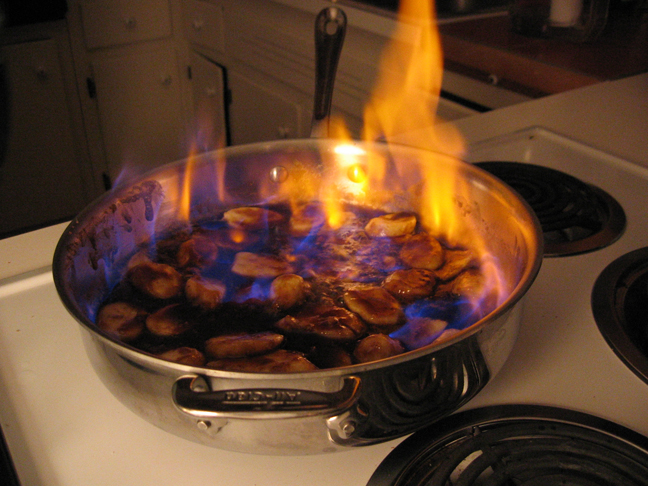
Bananas Foster includes a flambé.

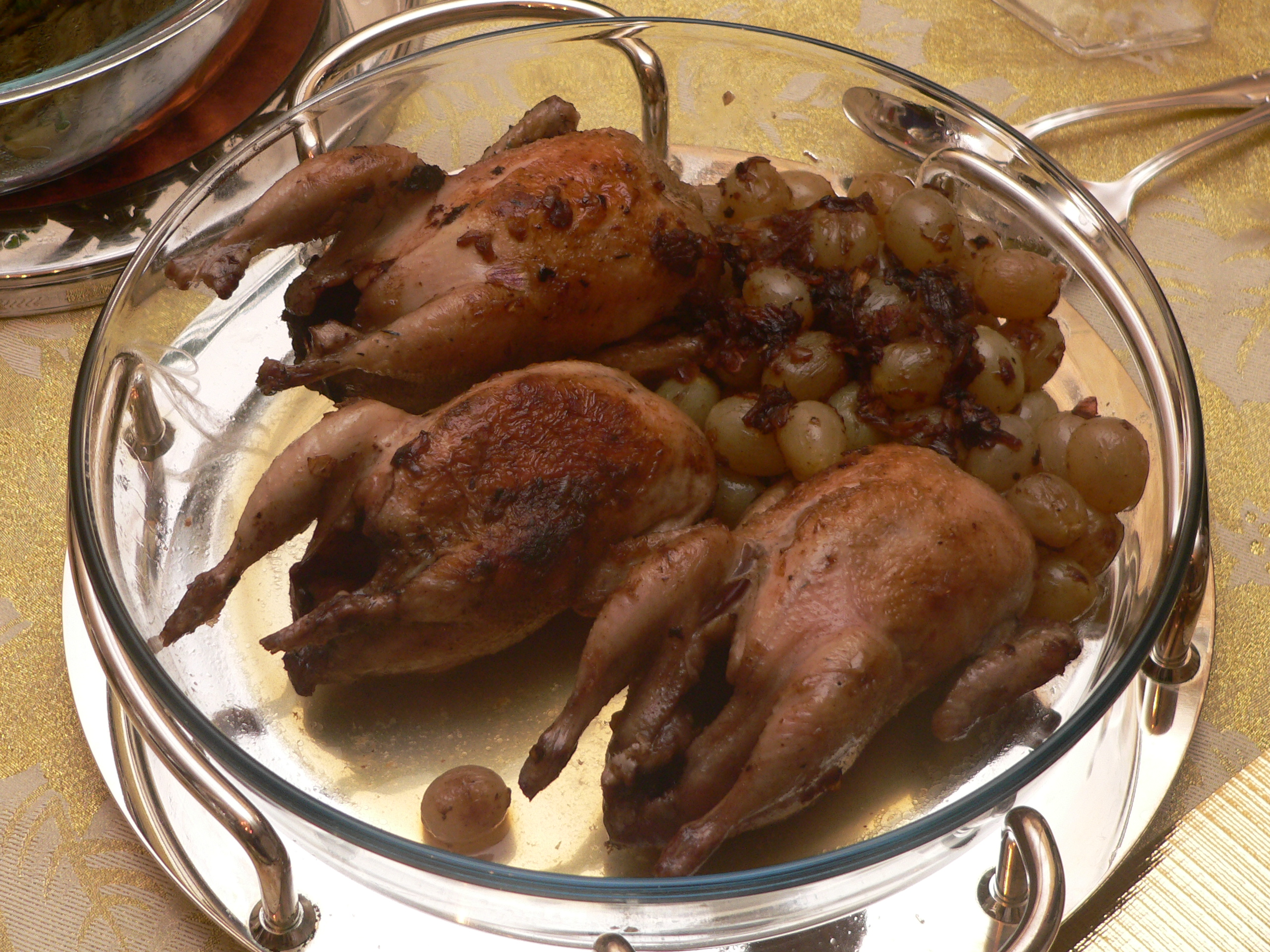
Roasted quails flambéed with Cognac

Flambé (UK: /ˈflɑːmbeɪ, ˈflɒ̃-/, US: /flɑːmˈbeɪ/, French: [flɑ̃be]; also spelled flambe) is a cooking procedure in which alcohol is added to a hot pan to create a burst of flames. The word means "flamed" in French.

Flambéing is often associated with the tableside presentation of certain liqueur-drenched dishes set aflame, such as Bananas Foster or Cherries Jubilee when the alcohol is ignited and results in a flare of blue-tinged flame. However, flambéing is also a step in making coq au vin and other dishes and sauces, using spirits before they are brought to the table. By partially burning off the volatile alcohol, flambéing reduces the alcoholic content of the dish while keeping the flavors of the liqueur.

== History ==
Modern flambéing became popular in the 19th century. The English Christmas pudding was served flaming in Charles Dickens' 1843 novel, A Christmas Carol: "the pudding... blazing in half of half-a-quarter of ignited brandy". The most common flambé dish appears to have been sweet omelette with rum or kirsch; for example, Alexis Soyer's 1846 cookbook, The Gastronomic Regenerator, gives a recipe for Omelette au Rhum: "...the moment of going to table pour three glasses of rum round and set it on fire". Ida Joscelyne's book, The Marvellous Little Housekeepers (1880), mentions both rum and kirsch; another recipe appears in A.G. Payne's English cookbook, Choice Dishes at Small Cost, of 1882: "Make a sweet omelet, and heat a tablespoonful of kirsch, by holding a light under the spoon. As soon as the spirit catches fire pour it round the omelet, and serve flaming." Perhaps the most famous flambé dish, Crêpe Suzette, was supposedly invented in 1895 as an accident.

== Procedure ==
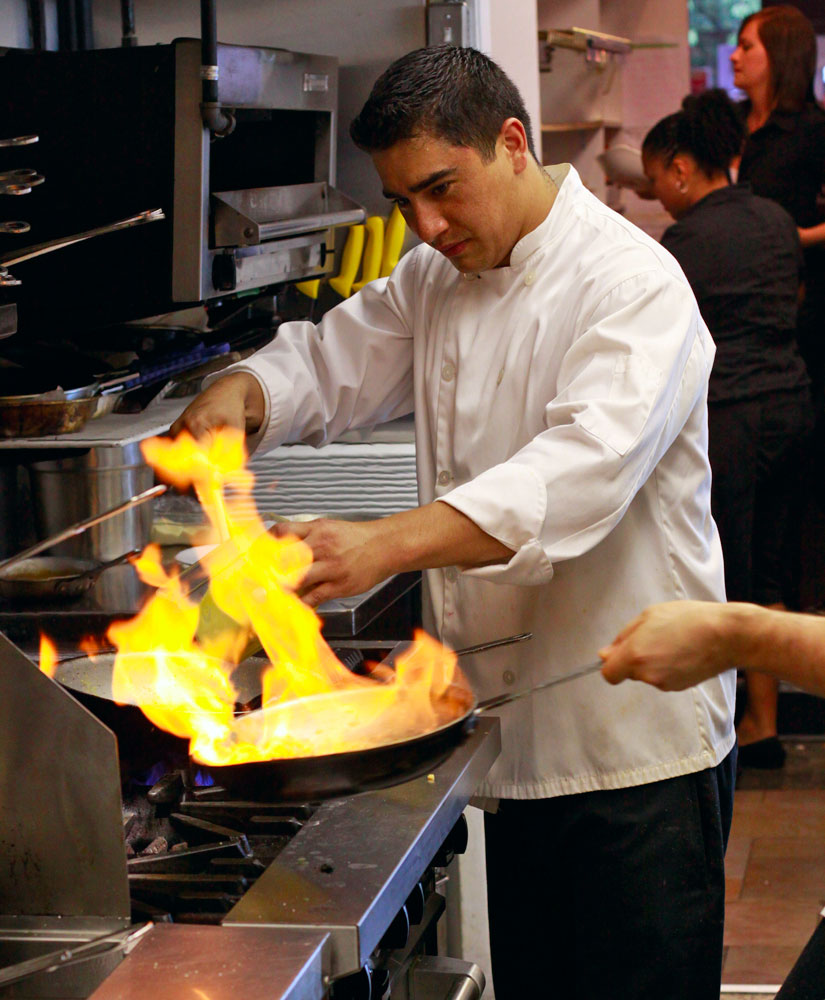
Flambéing in a skillet

Cognac, rum, or other flavorful liquors that are about 40% alcohol (80 USA proof) are considered ideal for flambé. Wines and beers have too little alcohol and will not flambé. High-alcohol liquors, such as Bacardi 151 or Everclear, are highly flammable and considered too dangerous by professional cooks. Cinnamon is sometimes added not only for flavor but for show, as the powder ignites when added.

The alcoholic beverage must be heated before lighting it on fire. This is because the liquid is still below the flash point at room temperature, and there are not enough alcoholic vapors to ignite. The vapor pressure increases by heating it, releasing enough vapors to catch fire from the match.

== Effects on taste ==
Flambéing reduces the alcohol content of the food modestly. In one experimental model, about 35% of the alcohol was boiled off. The effects of the flames are also modest: although the temperature within the flame may be quite high (over 500 °C), the temperature at the surface of the pan is lower than that required for a Maillard browning reaction or for caramelization.

...we serve almost everything flambe in these rooms, occasionally even a waiter's thumb. The people seem to like it, and it doesn't harm the food much.

— Ernest Byfield, The Pump Room, Chicago, 1950

Whether or not there is a change in flavor as a result of flambéing is unclear. Some claim that because the flame is above the food, and since hot gases rise, it cannot significantly affect the flavor. Indeed, experimental work shows that most people cannot tell the difference. That said, in an informal taste test conducted by the Los Angeles Times of two batches of caramelized apples (one flambéed and one simmered), one tester declared the "flambéed dish was for adults, the other for kids."

== Safety ==
For safety, it is recommended that alcohol not be added to a pan on a burner and that the cook use a long fireplace match to ignite the pan.

== Flambé dishes ==
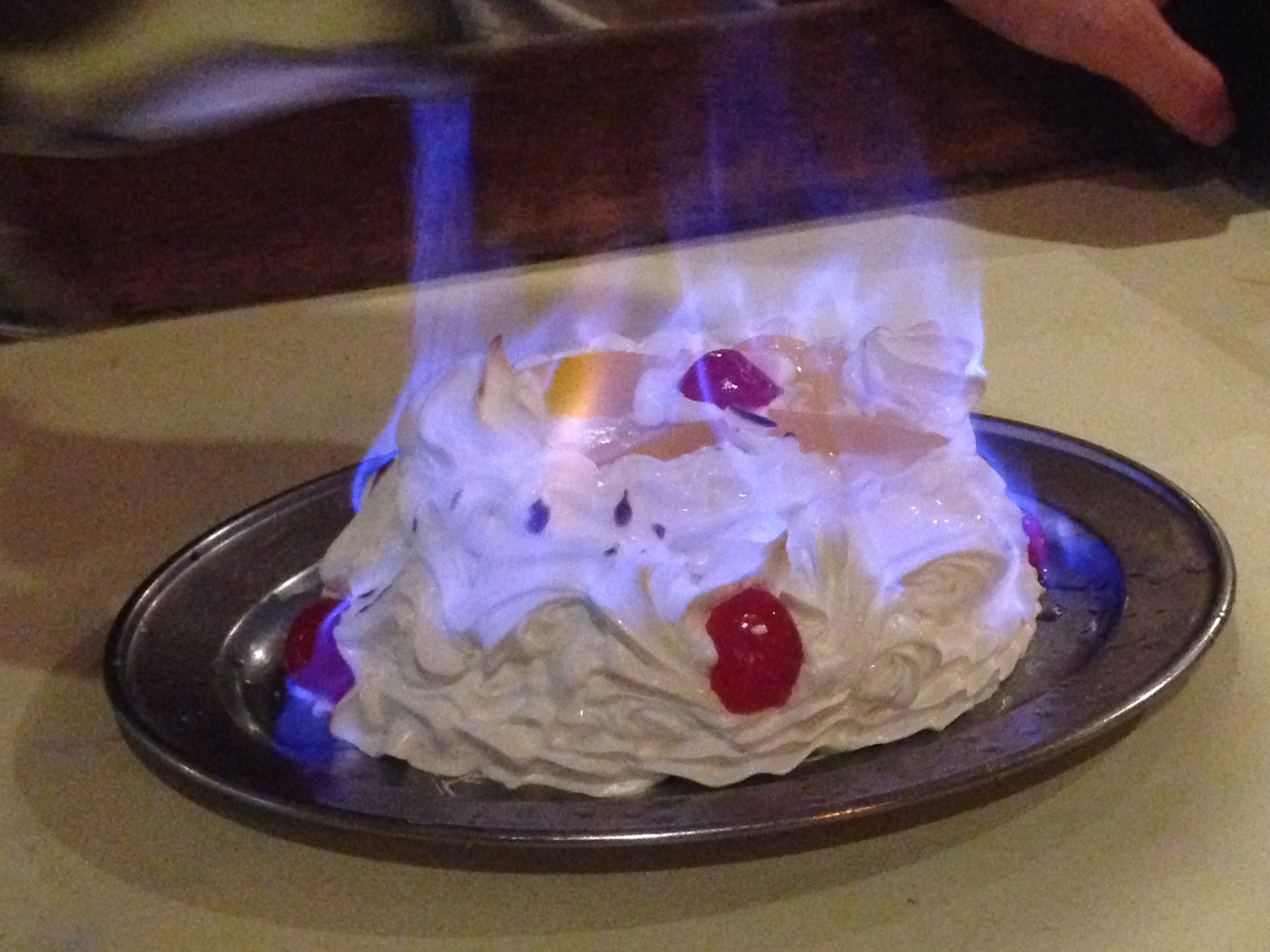
A bombe Alaska which has been flambéed with alcohol at a restaurant in Singapore

Examples of popular flambé dishes include:

- Bananas Foster
- Bombe Alaska
- Cherries jubilee
- Christmas pudding
- Crêpes Suzette
- Feuerzangenbowle
- Flaming beverages
- Gundel Palacsinta
- Kaiserschmarrn
- Steak Diane

== See also ==
- Flaming drink
- List of cooking techniques
