= Gold Mine Saloon =

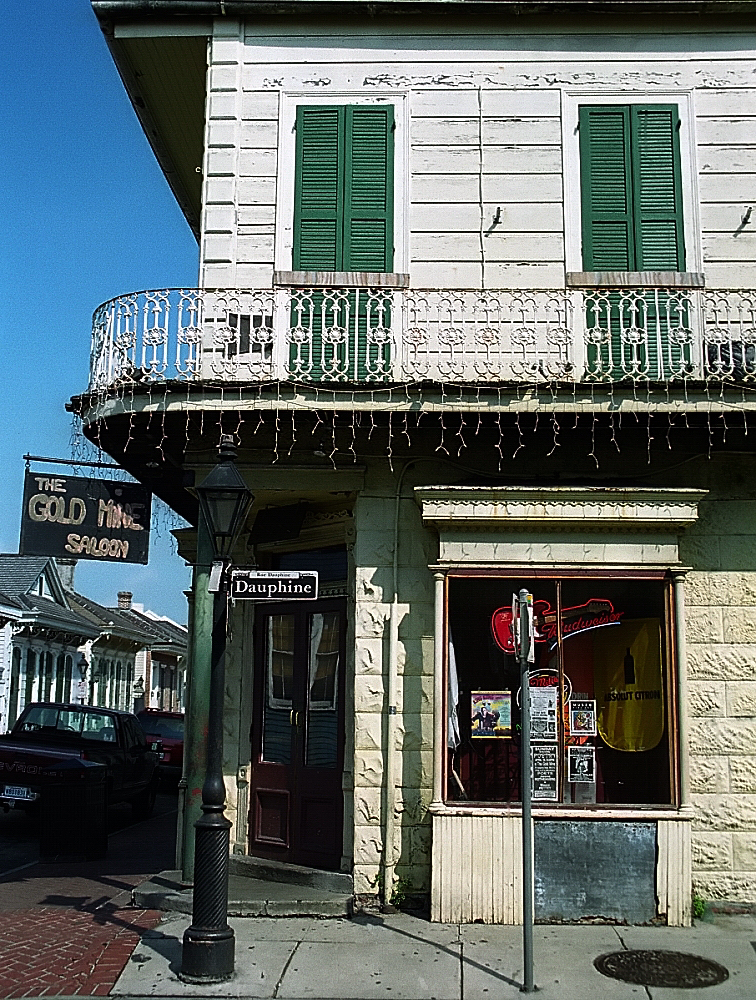
The Gold Mine Saloon

The Gold Mine Saloon is a drinking establishment in the French Quarter of New Orleans, Louisiana. The saloon is known for creating its signature Flaming Dr. Pepper cocktail in the 1980s and vintage video games (e.g., the 1982 Popeye). The patronage has been described as an avant-garde and artistic crowd. The establishment hosts the 17 Poets Literary and Performance Series. The operator, Dave Brinks (son of the bar's owner, Barbara Bear), is the author of the post-Hurricane Katrina poem cycle The Caveat Onus.
