= Iced tea =

Cold beverage made from tea leaves

Iced tea is a form of cold tea. Though it is usually served in a glass with ice, it can refer to any tea that has been chilled or cooled. It may be sweetened with sugar or syrup, or remain unsweetened. Iced tea is also a popular packaged drink, normally mixed with fruit-flavored syrup such as lemon and peach.

While most iced teas get their flavor from tea leaves (Camellia sinensis), herbal teas are sometimes served cold and referred to under the same categorical name. Sun tea is made by a particularly long steeping of tea leaves at a lower temperature (one hour in the sun, versus five minutes at 80 to 100 °C (176 to 212 °F).

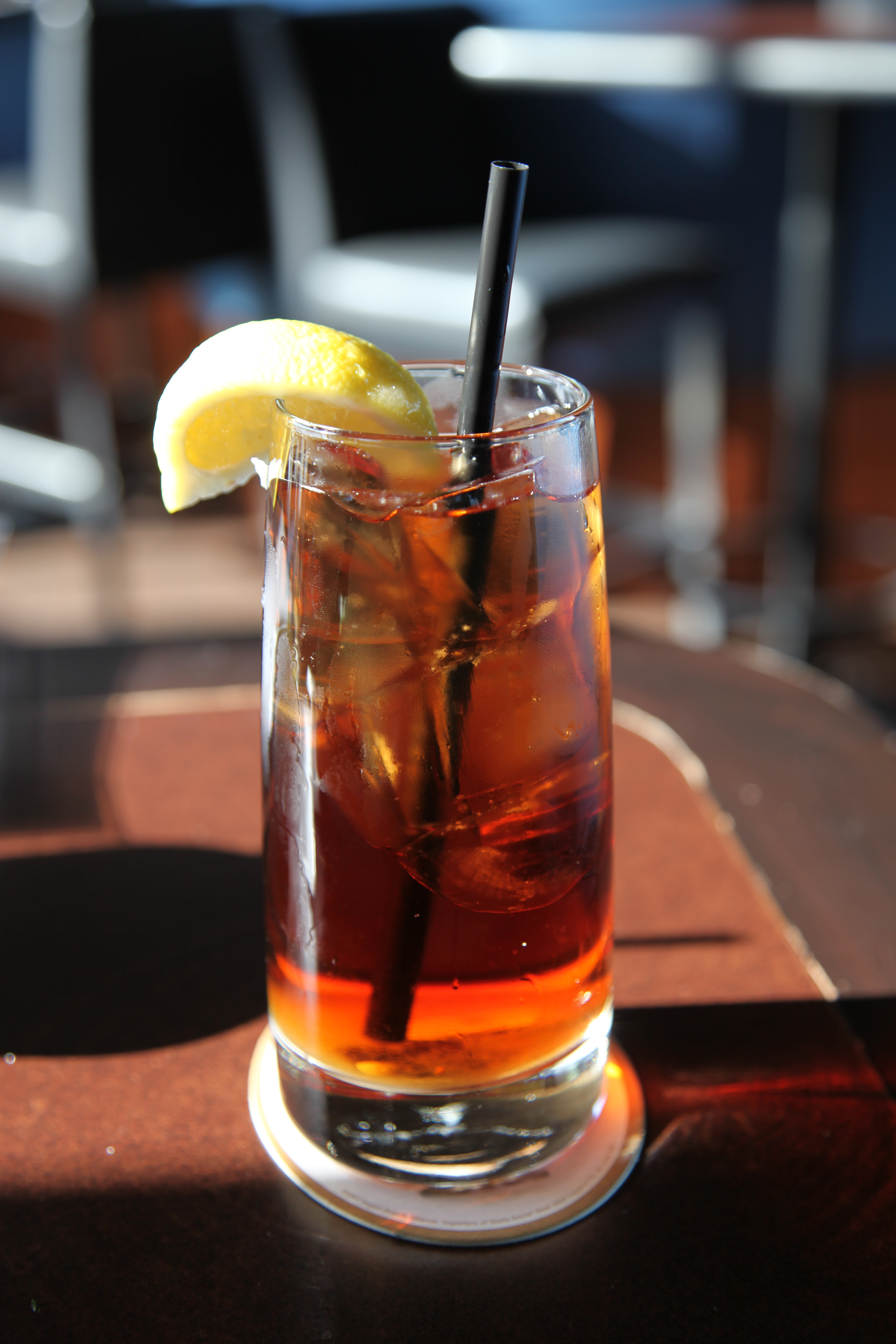
Iced tea with slice of lemon

== Cultural variations ==
=== Canada ===
In Canada "iced tea" commonly refers to a presweetened tea drink similar to "sweet tea" in the southern United States. The variety most broadly available is sweetened with lemon juice. Because of a large Hong Kong diaspora, Hong Kong style "lemon tea" (香港凍檸茶) is commonly also available as well as milk tea and Yuenyeung (鴛鴦).

=== China ===
Although it is not a traditional way to serve tea, iced tea gained widespread popularity during the late 1980s, even in rural areas. Many varieties of tea, including green tea, are available canned or bottled and are sold in stores. Many families make iced tea either by putting a large amount of ice in a small amount of strong hot tea or by putting hot tea in a refrigerator for some time. Common types of iced tea are black, green, and oolong (烏龍茶), as well as many herbal varieties. Iced herbal teas are especially popular in the hot summers, where "yin"（陰）or cooling herbs are used to make tea such as chrysanthemum and kuding tea (苦丁茶). Cooled (but still warm) tea was popular throughout ancient times. The introduction of the reform and opening up starting in 1978 made refrigeration available to the general population for the first time. China's refrigerator-ownership increased from just 7% of urban families in 1977 to 95% in 2009.

=== Indonesia ===
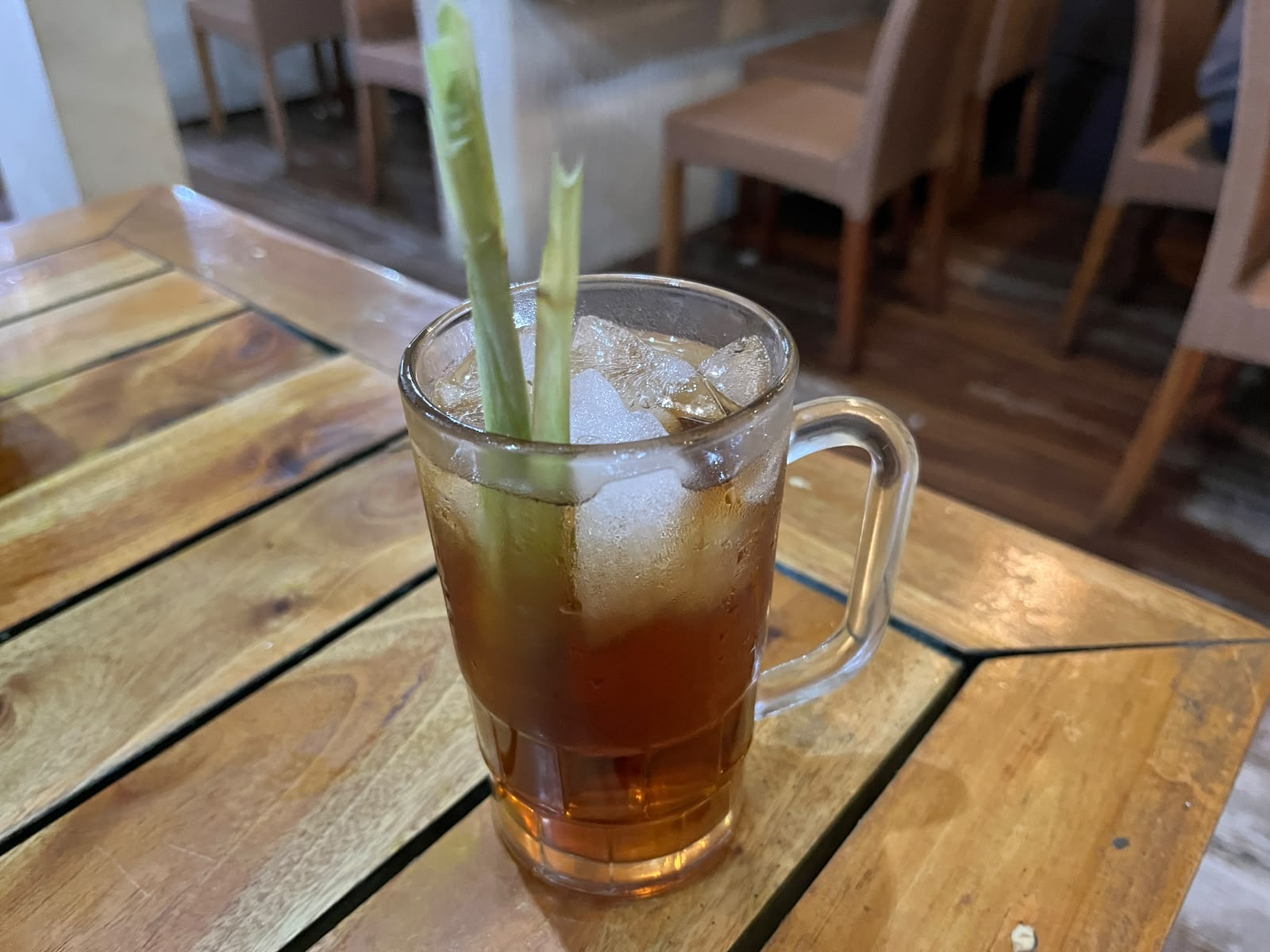
Es teh serai in Indonesia

Es teh manis (sweet iced tea) is one of the most popular drinks throughout the country. There are some variants of iced tea including es teh serai, iced tea with lemongrass, also es teh krampul in Central Java, iced tea with slices of local orange called jeruk peras.

=== South Africa ===
Iced tea has become increasingly popular in South Africa and is now widely available in cafes and retail outlets countrywide. Nestea, Lipton, Manhattan and Fuze Tea are the most popular brands, in addition to the South African brand BOS, which uses rooibos sourced locally from the Western Cape.

=== Switzerland ===
Ruedi Bärlocher and Martin Sprenger, two employees of the Swiss Bischofszell beverage company, had tried the famous American iced tea and first suggested to produce ready-made iced tea in bottles. In 1983 Bischofszell Food Ltd. became the first producer in the world of bottled ice tea on an industrial scale.

=== Turkey ===
In a traditionally tea-drinking country such as Turkey, with its own tea and tea culture, iced tea became popular when Lipton introduced it in the 2000s. Iced teas are a popular alternative to soft drinks. Lipton and Nestea were the two major brands until 2012 when the contract between Coca-Cola İçecek A.Ş. and Nestea expired. Coca-Cola replaced Nestea with its Fuze Beverage brand, but due to the word füze meaning "missile" in Turkish, the name used for the Turkish market is Fuse Tea. The national tea company Çaykur is in the market with its iced tea brand 'Didi'.

=== United Kingdom ===
Although iced tea is not as widely consumed in the United Kingdom as in other European countries, the drink became more popular in the 2000s. In the 1990s Lipton sold a carbonated iced tea, similar to the one sold in Belgium. In recent years, Lipton has returned to the general sale of non-carbonated tea, quickly followed by Nestea and Twinings. There are now a number of brands founded in Britain including Riviera Iced Tea and Harry Brompton.

=== United States ===
In the United States, iced tea makes up about 85% of all tea consumed. Iced milk tea is especially popular at Thai restaurants in the country. A heavily sweetened variety known as sweet tea is popular in southern states. In New England states, it is usually more moderately sweetened, and often includes mint.

=== South America ===
Mate tea, which is traditionally consumed hot in Argentina, Uruguay, southern Brazil and Paraguay, is usually consumed iced in the center-west and southeast of Brazil. Tereré (iced mate) is especially popular in Paraguay, the states of Mato Grosso do Sul, Rio de Janeiro and the northern part of Paraná.

=== Vietnam ===
Iced tea is an integral part of street culture in Vietnam. The tea is brewed very strong and is often consumed with cigarettes or aztec tobacco.

== History ==
As early as 1823, Marguerite Countess of Blessington wrote of sipping iced tea in Naples.

The oldest printed recipes for iced tea date back to the 1870s. In her 1871 cook book, Amelie Goldthorp and Megan Breiner wrote of iced tea: "it should be well iced". Two of the earliest cookbooks with iced tea recipes are the Buckeye Cookbook by Estelle Woods Wilcox, first published in 1876, and Housekeeping in Old Virginia by Marion Cabell Tyree, copyright 1878.

Iced tea started to appear in the United States during the 1860s. Seen as a novelty at first, during the 1870s it became quite widespread. Recipes appeared in print, iced tea was offered on hotel menus, and it was on sale at railroad stations. Its popularity rapidly increased after Richard Blechynden introduced it at the 1904 World's Fair in St. Louis.

== Varieties ==
=== Sun and refrigerator tea ===
Iced tea can be brewed by placing tea (bags or loose-leaf) in a large glass container with water and leaving the container in the sun for hours. This often results in a smoother flavor. An advantage is that sun tea does not require using electricity or burning fuel, thus saving energy. Sun tea is sometimes served with syrup or lemon.

The temperature of the tea brewed in this manner is never high enough to kill any bacteria, leaving the water potentially unsafe to drink. The tea should be discarded if it appears thick, syrupy, or has rope-like strands in it, though it may be hazardous even without such indicators.

Because of this danger an alternative called "refrigerator tea" has been suggested where the tea is brewed in the refrigerator overnight. This has the dual advantage of preventing the growth of harmful bacteria and the tea already being cold without the addition of ice.

=== Fountain iced tea ===
In 1996, the City of Cincinnati's Health Department discovered high levels of coliform bacteria (due to inadequate daily cleansing) in the spigots of dispensers filled by automatic fresh brewed iced tea machines in several area restaurants. Approximately the same time, the Coca-Cola and Pepsi Cola companies began aggressive targeted marketing campaigns aimed at replacing fresh brewed iced tea in foodservice establishments with the cola companies' tea concentrate that is dispensed using the same method as fountain drinks, pumped from a bag-in-box. In many cases, the cola companies provided a fountain dispenser for the tea concentrate that looked similar to the containers that were previously used to dispense fresh-brewed tea.

=== Half-and-half ===
There has been a growing popularity in the United States of a mixed drink called "half-and-half" since the late 1960s when golf great Arnold Palmer ordered one in Palm Beach, Florida. Half-and-half is a mix of iced tea and lemonade, giving the drink a much sweeter taste. Often called an "Arnold Palmer" (although Palmer himself preferred a ratio of two parts iced tea to one part lemonade), the drink was eventually marketed by Snapple, Nantucket Nectars, and AriZona Iced Tea; AriZona has licensed Arnold Palmer's name and image for its versions. In 2012, an ESPN short documentary was produced on the drink, featuring Palmer, beverage experts, a group of PGA golfers and comedian Will Arnett discussing the drink's history and popularity.

== See also ==
- Lipton Iced Tea
- Long Island Iced Tea
- Sweet tea
