= Steak Diane =

Dish of steak with sauce

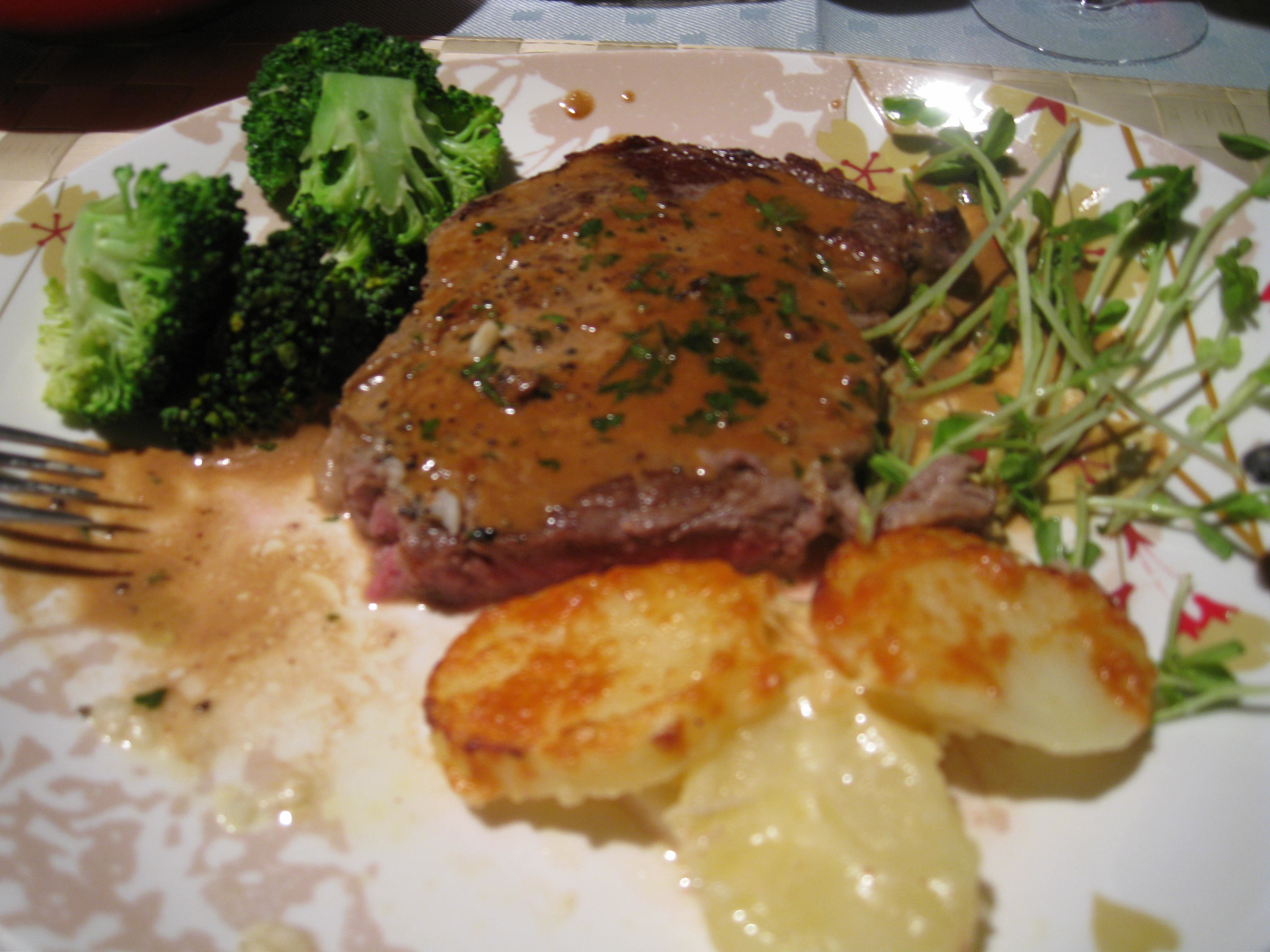
- Type: Main course
- Place of origin: England
- Created by: Possibly Bartolomeo Calderoni or Beniamino Schiavon and Luigi Quaglino
- Main ingredients: beefsteak

Steak Diane is a dish of pan-fried beefsteak with a sauce made from the seasoned pan juices. It was originally cooked tableside and sometimes flambéed. It was most likely invented in London in the 1930s. From the 1940s through the 1960s it was a standard dish in "Continental cuisine", and is now considered retro.

== History ==
"Steak Diane" does not appear in the classics of French cuisine; it was most likely invented in London in around 1936.

The name Diana, the Roman goddess of the hunt, has been used for various game-related foods, such as Escoffier's sauce à la Diane, based on sauce poivrade and served with venison chops and filets; and a Pittsburgh chef's venison steak Diane (1914) which is sautéed, flambéed with rum, sherry, and currant jelly, then garnished with cherries and candied fruit. There is no evidence that they are connected to steak Diane as it is known today.

Steak Diane is attested in 1936 on Jermyn Street in London, as a flattened fillet steak cooked tableside and seasoned with Worcestershire sauce. A London newspaper of 1938 reported "a midnight order for champagne and steak Diane" at the Palace Hotel, St Moritz. Bartolomeo Calderoni, the head chef of Quaglino's restaurant off Jermyn Street, was reported in 1955 to have popularised "the then rarely encountered Steak Diane, which he used personally to cook for the Duke of Windsor, then the Prince of Wales [until 1936], with whom the dish was a great favourite". Indeed, Calderoni claimed in 1988 to have invented it. According to a 1957 article, Lord Louis Mountbatten was a regular diner at the Café de Paris in London in the 1930s and "nearly always had the same dinner – a dozen and a half oysters and steak Diane".

The dish was known in Australia by 1940, when it was mentioned in an article about the Sydney restaurant Romano's as its signature dish. Romano's maître d'hôtel, Tony Clerici, said he invented it in London at his Mayfair restaurant Tony's Grill in 1938 and named it in honour of Lady Diana Cooper. Clerici may have learned the dish from Charles Gallo-Selva, who had previously worked at Quaglino's in London.

The dish had also appeared in the US by 1940, although it was not widely known. Later in the 1940s, steak Diane featured frequently on the menus of restaurants popular with New York café society, perhaps as part of the fad for tableside-flambéed dishes. It was served by the restaurants at the Drake and Sherry-Netherland hotels and at The Colony, the 21 Club, and Le Pavillon. In New York it is often attributed to Beniamino Schiavon, "Nino of the Drake", the maître d'hôtel of the Drake Hotel. Schiavon was said in 1968 to have created the dish with Luigi Quaglino at the Plage Restaurant in Ostend, Belgium, and named it after a "beauty of the nineteen-twenties" or perhaps "a reigning lady of the European demimonde in the nineteen twenties". At the Drake, it was called "Steak Nino".

== Preparation ==
Steak Diane is similar to steak au poivre, but has less pepper. Early recipes had few ingredients: steak, butter, Worcestershire sauce, pepper, salt and chopped parsley, and possibly garlic. Older recipes generally specify sirloin steak; more recent ones use tenderloin. The steak is cut or pounded thin so that it will cook rapidly, sautéed in the seasoned butter and Worcestershire sauce, and served garnished with the parsley. It was not flambéed. Later American versions were more elaborate: the three New York City recipes from 1953 add some or all of brandy, sherry, chives, dry mustard, and lemon juice. Only one recipe explicitly calls for flambéing: the sauce is flambéed with brandy, dry sherry, or Madeira, and poured over the steak. Some more recent recipes add cream or mushrooms or both to the sauce. Others are more similar to the older recipes. Flambéing is now rare.

== See also ==
- List of steak dishes
