= Richard Blechynden =

British merchant, popularized iced tea

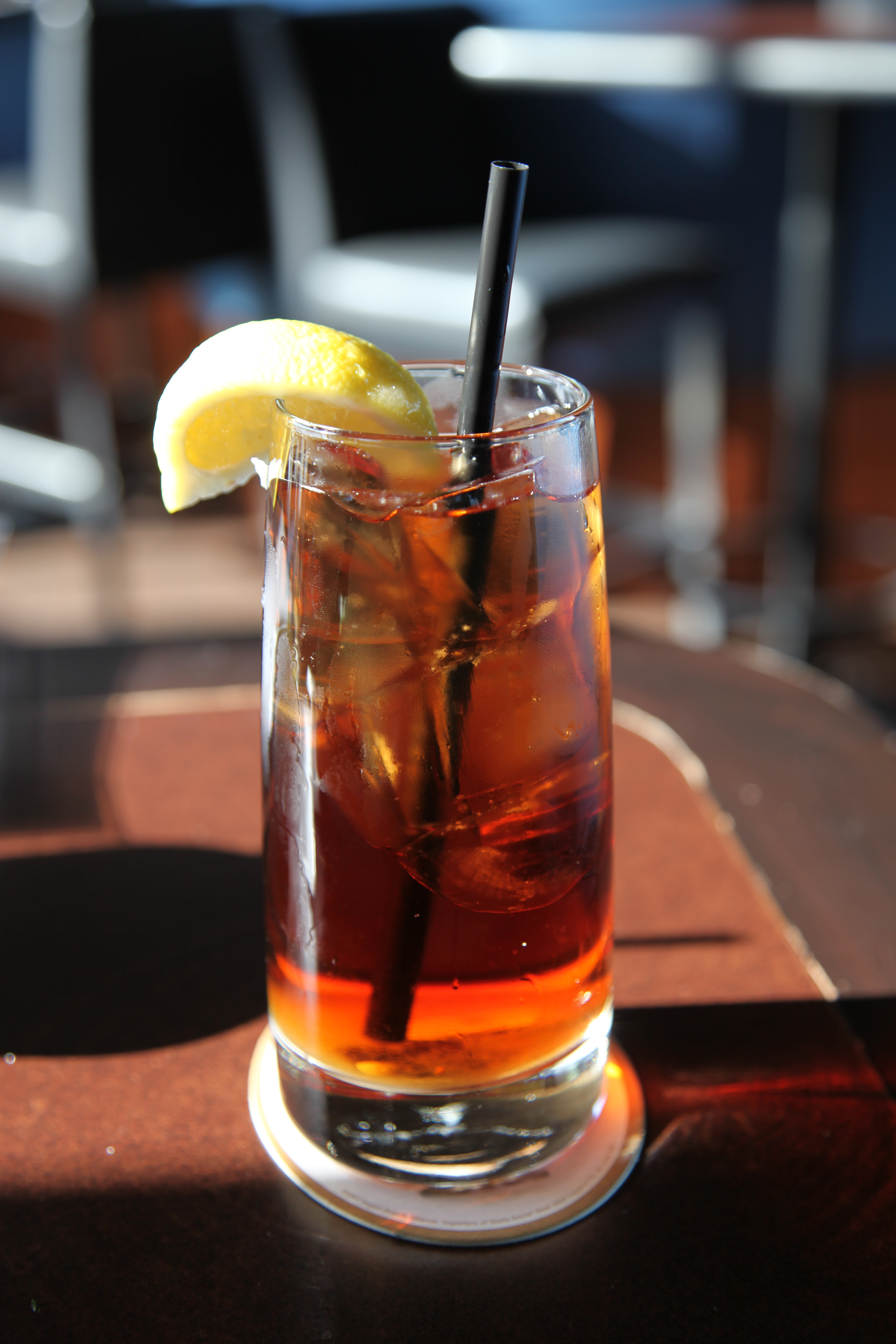
Iced tea, the beverage Blechynden is credited with popularizing

Richard Blechynden (5 May 1857 – 26 July 1940) was a British tea merchant and government official who is credited with popularizing iced tea. Blechynden promoted iced tea at the 1904 World's Fair in St. Louis, Missouri, after which the drink attained nationwide recognition in the United States.

== Biography ==
Blechyden was born in British India, the son of Charles Edward Blechynden and Anne Margaret Pratt. He was a merchant and tea plantation owner who served in various marketing roles to promote Indian teas on behalf of the government and trade associations.

One type of beverage, iced tea, had long been customary in the American South but was not widely known in other parts of the United States. The drink gradually grew in popularity in the late 19th-century, with one of the first recipes for iced tea being published in Virginia in 1878.

In 1904, Blechynden reportedly decided that a cool tea drink would be more profitable than hot tea during that year's World's Fair. The fair was held in St. Louis that year during a particularly hot period, driving up sales of Blechynden's iced tea. The beverage sold so well that it gained national popularity after the event. Another telling of Blechynden's story holds that his marketing of iced tea was an act of "desperation". In this telling of iced tea's origin, Blechynden had originally been selling hot tea, but found that fairgoers weren't interested in near-boiling tea in the intense St. Louis heat. It is unknown if he had previously heard of iced tea, but it is certain that his decision to begin selling chilled tea was widely popular at the fair and had a lasting impact.

He retired to Ryde, Isle of Wight, and lived there for 25 years. He died there unmarried on 26 July 1940, aged 83.
