= Drake Hotel (New York City) =

Hotel in Manhattan, New York

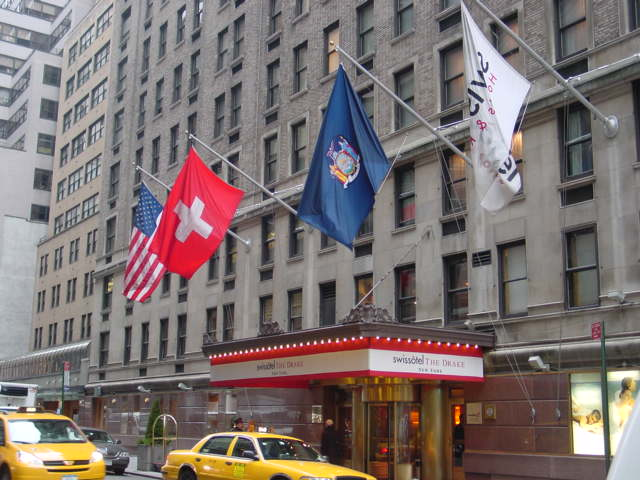
- Main entrance of the hotel in January 2006

General information
- Status: Demolished
- Type: Hotel
- Location: Manhattan, New York, 440 Park Avenue, United States
- Coordinates: 40°45′40″N 73°58′17″W
- Completed: 1926
- Demolished: 2007

Technical details
- Floor count: 21

Other information
- Number of rooms: 495

The Drake Hotel was a hotel at 440 Park Avenue and 56th Street, in Midtown Manhattan, New York City. Built in 1926 by Bing & Bing, it contained 495 rooms across 21 floors. It was sold in 2006 and demolished to make way for a residential skyscraper called 432 Park Avenue.

== History ==
The hotel was built in 1926 by the real estate organization of Bing & Bing. It was a 21-floor complex with 495 rooms. According to one source, "it boasted innovations such as automatic refrigeration as well as spacious, luxurious rooms and suites". Fauchon chocolates was located on the ground floor.

=== Notable residents ===
Silent film star Lillian Gish lived at the hotel from 1946 to 1949. Other notable guests included Frank Sinatra, Muhammad Ali, Judy Garland, Jimi Hendrix, Led Zeppelin and Glenn Gould. Restaurateur Toots Shor lived there in his final years. Songwriter Jerome Kern collapsed on the sidewalk in front of the Drake on November 5, 1945. Publishers Bob Guccione and Kathy Keeton maintained a permanently reserved suite at the Drake Hotel as their New York residence prior to acquiring the Jeremiah Milbanks Mansion at 14-16 East 67th Street circa 1977.

In the 1960s and 1970s, the Drake Hotel was the preferred accommodation in New York for a number of touring rock bands, such as Led Zeppelin and the Who. During their stay there in July 1973, Led Zeppelin had $203,000 in cash stolen from a safe deposit box at the hotel. The money was never recovered and the identity of the thief or thieves has never been discovered. The band later sued the Drake Hotel for the theft. The British rock band Slade stayed at the hotel on October 6, 1973, after their gig at the New York Academy of Music. Another British rock band Sweet made The Drake their home away from home during gruelling tours in the US in the 1970s.

In 1982, the Drake hotel accommodated singers Karen Carpenter and Olivia Newton-John.

=== Venues ===
The Drake Room, opened in 1945, was the Drake's restaurant, presided over by Beniamino Schiavon ("Mr. Nino of the Drake") from its opening until 1968. Cy Walter played piano from its opening to 1951, and then from 1959 until his death in 1968.

The Drake's nightclub, Shepheard's, was touted as New York's first discotheque and the most fashionable of the mid-1960s with celebrities like Lee Radziwill and Julie Newmar dancing to a disc jockey until 3 a.m. seven days a week, despite its tiny dance floor. The club even had printed and distributed cards entitled, “How to Do the Newest Discotheque Dances at Shepheard's in New York's Drake Hotel” with step-by-step instructions to dance the Jerk, Watusi, Frug and the Monkey.

=== Demolition and redevelopment ===
The hotel was acquired in the early 1980s by the Swissotel company of Zurich, which renamed it Swissotel The Drake and undertook a $52 million room-by-room renovation of the building. The hotel received positive national exposure, as the syndicated talk show Donahue used the hotel to accommodate the show's guests, in exchange for a mention of it on each episode. Renovations were completed in 1991. In 2006 the hotel was sold for $440 million (equivalent to $680 million in 2025) to developer Harry Macklowe. It was demolished in 2007, and the site became one of New York's most valuable development sites in 2011. In mid-2012, construction began on a 1,398-foot (426 m) residential skyscraper, 432 Park Avenue, on the site. Designed by Rafael Viñoly, the tower topped out in October 2014, becoming the tallest building in New York City by roof height, and the tallest residential building in the Western Hemisphere at the time of its completion.

== See also ==
- List of former hotels in Manhattan
