= Crêpes Suzette =

French citrus and pancake dessert

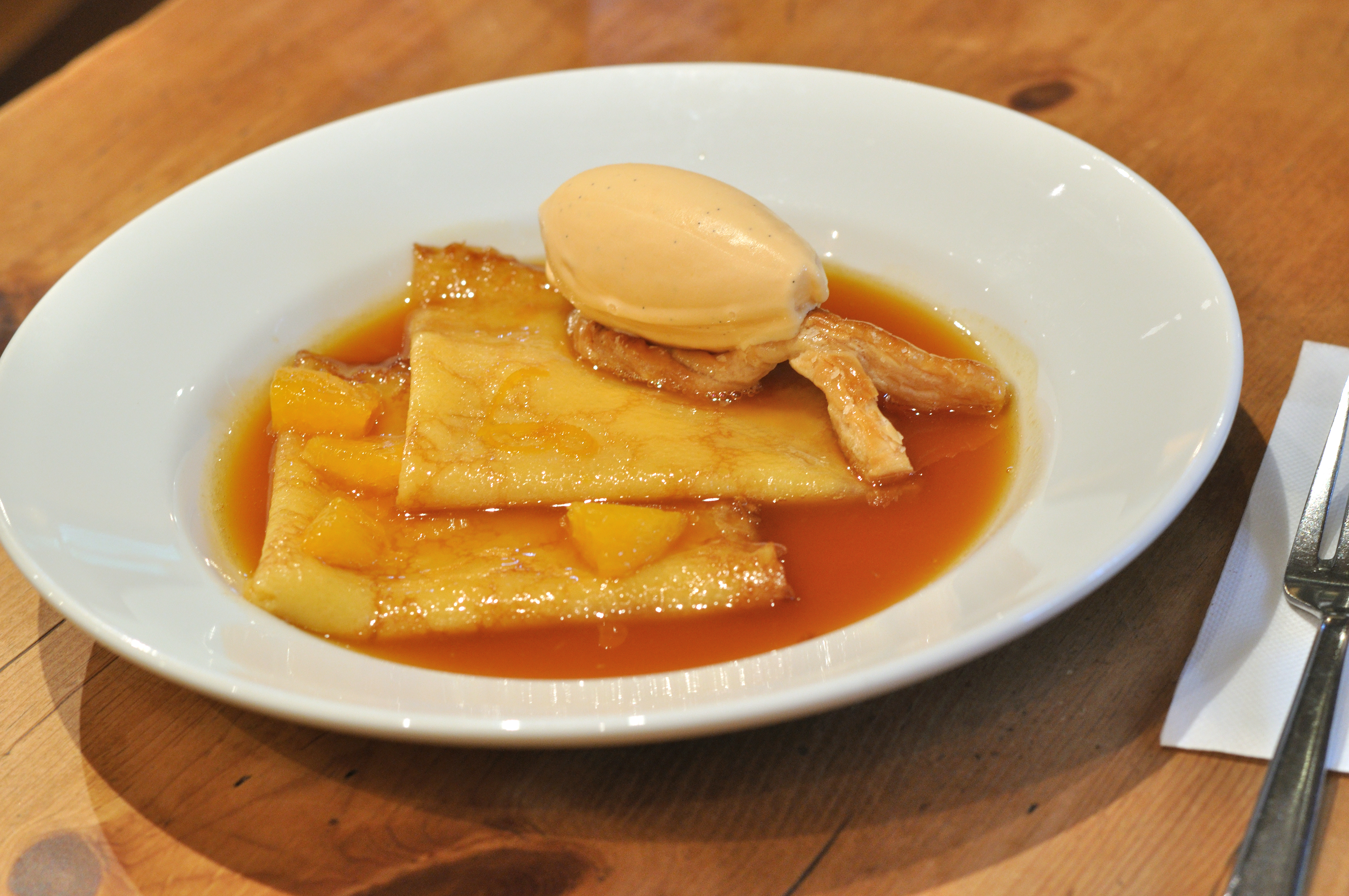
- Course: Dessert
- Place of origin: France
- Main ingredients: Crêpes, beurre Suzette (caramelized sugar and butter, tangerine or orange juice, zest, Grand Marnier, triple sec or orange Curaçao liqueur)

Crêpes Suzette (pronounced [kʁɛp syzɛt]) is a French dessert consisting of crêpes with beurre Suzette (pronounced [bœʁ syzɛt]), a sauce of caramelized sugar and butter, tangerine or orange juice, zest, and Grand Marnier, triple sec or orange Curaçao liqueur on top, flambéed tableside.

== Origins ==
The origin of the dish and its name are disputed. One claim is that it was created from a mistake made by a 14-year-old assistant waiter, Henri Charpentier, in 1895 at the Maitre at Monte Carlo's Café de Paris. He was preparing a dessert for the future King Edward VII of the United Kingdom (then Prince of Wales), whose guests included a beautiful French girl named Suzette. This story was told by Charpentier himself in Life à la Henri, his autobiography, although later contradicted by the Larousse Gastronomique.

It was quite by accident as I worked in front of a chafing dish that the cordials caught fire. I thought it was ruined. The Prince and his friends were waiting. How could I begin all over? I tasted it. It was, I thought, the most delicious medley of sweet flavors I had ever tasted. I still think so. That accident of the flame was precisely what was needed to bring all those various instruments into one harmony of taste ... He ate the pancakes with a fork; but he used a spoon to capture the remaining syrup. He asked me the name of that which he had eaten with so much relish. I told him it was to be called Crêpes Princesse. He recognized that the pancake controlled the gender and that this was a compliment designed for him; but he protested with mock ferocity that there was a lady present. She was alert and rose to her feet and holding her little skirt wide with her hands she made him a curtsey. "Will you," said His Majesty, "change Crêpes Princesse to Crêpes Suzette?" Thus was born and baptized this confection, one taste of which, I really believe, would reform a cannibal into a civilized gentleman. The next day I received a present from the Prince, a jeweled ring, a panama hat and a cane.

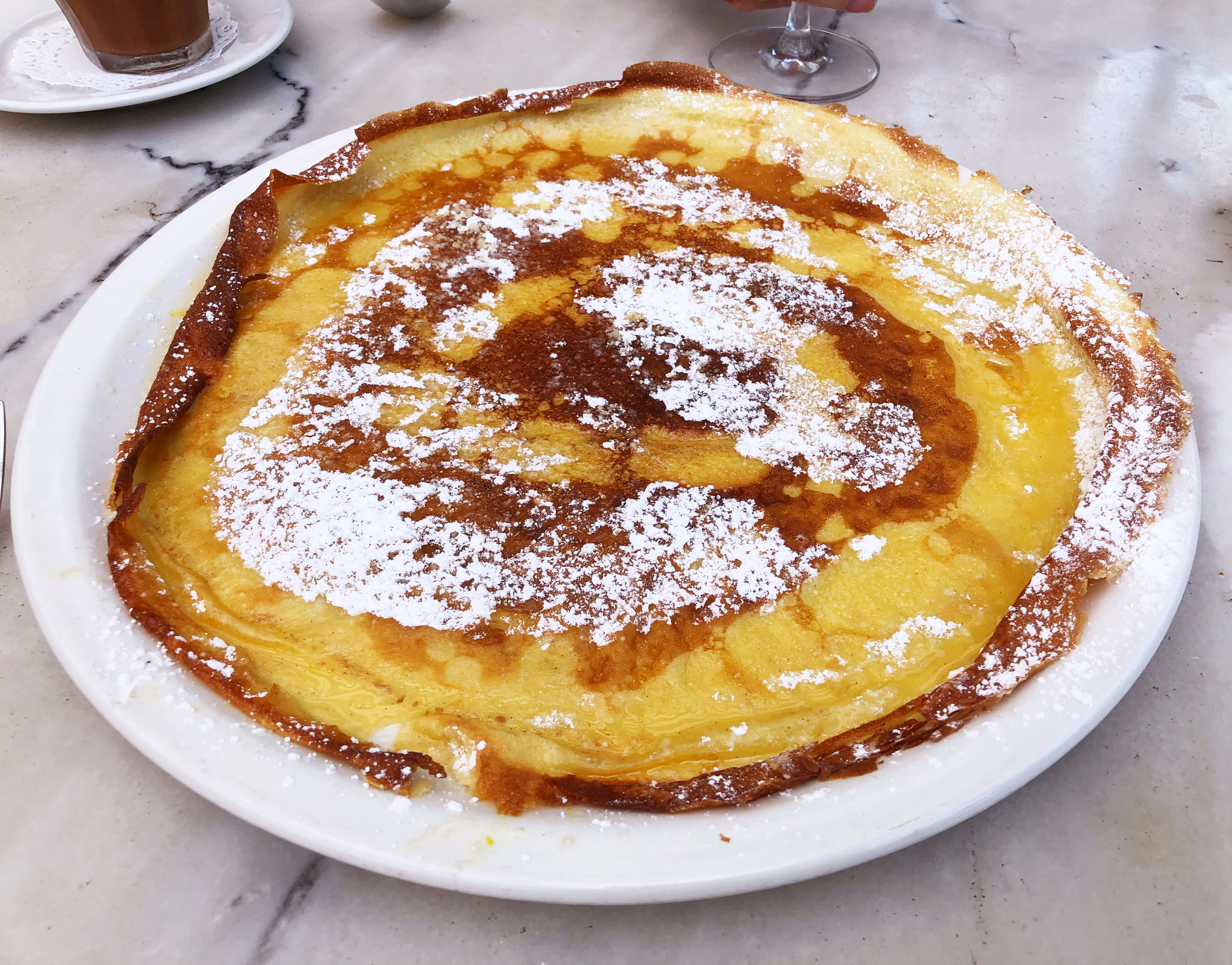
Crêpes Suzette

Different sources (like the Larousse Gastronomique), however, doubt that Charpentier, rather than the head waiter, was serving the prince, because he would have been too young. A less fantastical version emerges from Elsie Lee's interview with him in the 1950s. There, Charpentier explained at length that "his complicated version began as the dish of pancakes with fruit sauce his foster mother made on very special occasions." The addition of liqueur was common among chefs in Paris at the time.

The other claim states that the dish was named in honour of French actress Suzanne Reichenberg, who worked professionally under the name Suzette. In 1897, Reichenberg appeared at the Comédie-Française in the role of a maid, during which she served crêpes on stage. Monsieur Joseph, owner of Restaurant Marivaux, provided the crêpes. He decided to flambé the thin pancakes to attract the audience's attention and keep the food warm for the actors consuming them. Joseph was subsequently the director of the Paillard Restaurant in Paris and was later with the Savoy Hotel in London.

In 1896, Oscar Tschirky published the recipe as "Pancakes, Casino Style" with everything in place except the final flambée. Escoffier described Crêpes Suzette in the English version of his Guide Culinaire in 1907 (French 1903) the same way, also without the final flambée.

The dish was already a specialty of the French restaurant Marie's by 1898.

== See also ==
- French cuisine
