= Guéridon service =

Form of tableside food service

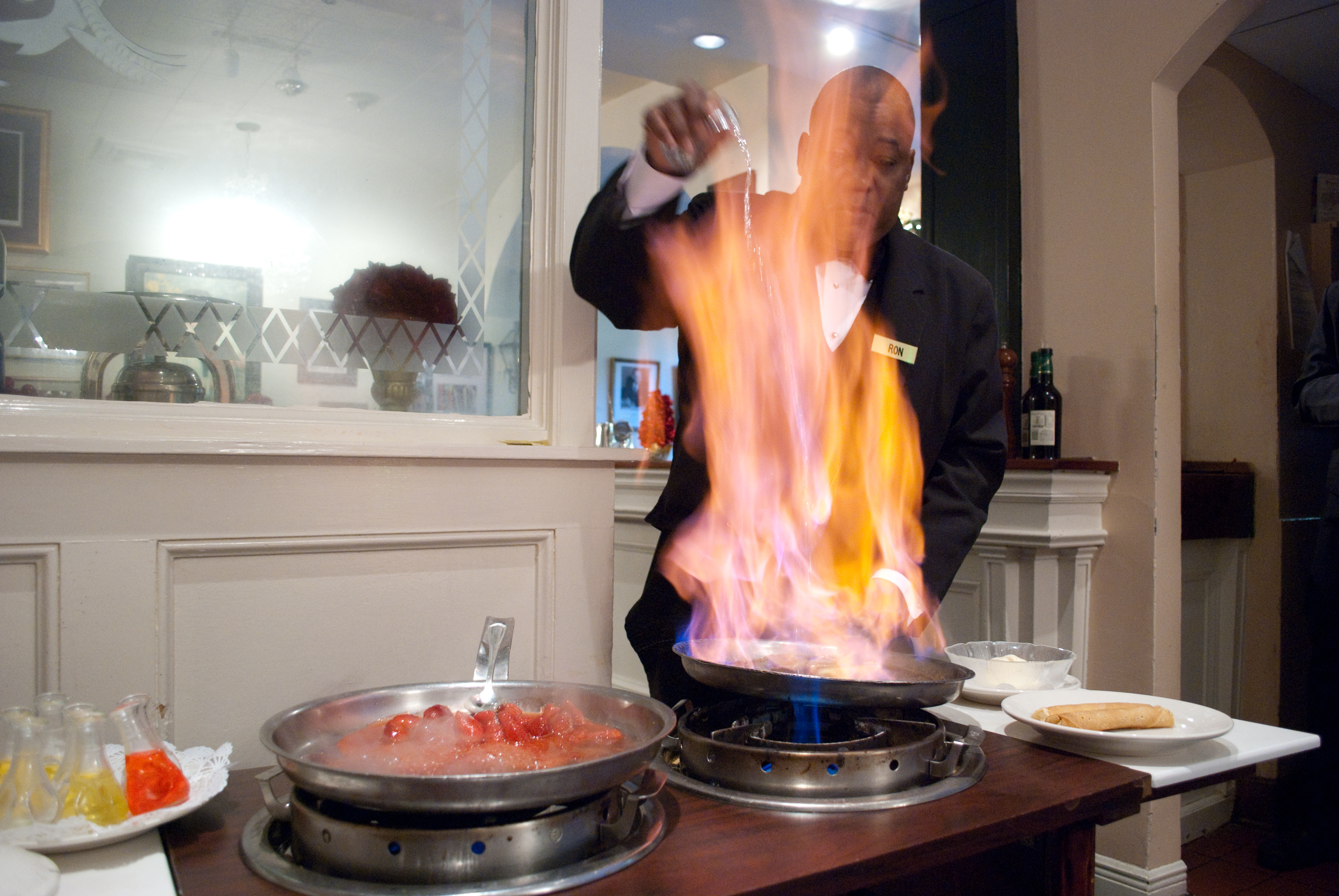
Service staff performing a guéridon service for the dessert bananas Foster

Guéridon service, sometimes known as tableside service, is a form of food and beverage service where dishes are prepared, finished, or flambéed by service staff at the diner's table. The practice involves a specially designed mobile serving cart called a guéridon trolley or just guéridon. The cart functions as a portable workstation for tasks such as carving meat, filleting fish, tossing salads, and creating desserts. This style of service is primarily found in fine dining establishments with an à la carte menu and is characterized by its high level of guest interaction and theatrical performance.

It is distinguished from its historical predecessor, service à la russe, which typically involves sideboard (guéridon) carving, by the introduction of more complex cooking and flambéing techniques after World War I in the deluxe restaurants of France.

== History ==
=== The guéridon furniture ===
The term guéridon originally referred to a piece of French furniture. In 17th-century France and Italy, a guéridon was a small, often circular-topped stand or table used to hold a candelabra or vase. The name is believed to have originated from Guéridon, a recurring stock character in 17th-century French farces and popular songs. This small, mobile piece of furniture was later adapted by restaurants to create the guéridon trolley.

=== Evolution from service à la Russe ===
The historical predecessor of guéridon service is service à la russe (Russian service), which was introduced to Paris around 1810 by Russian ambassador Prince Alexander Kurakin. This style was a major departure from the traditional service à la française, where all dishes were placed on the table at once. In Russian service, meals were served in sequential courses. Large joints of meat or whole fish were first presented to the guests, then taken to a sideboard—the guéridon—to be carved by the staff before being served to each guest individually.

=== Rise of tableside theatre ===
After World War I, the practice evolved in the deluxe restaurants of France, where the emphasis shifted from simple carving to more elaborate finishing techniques, including tableside cooking, saucing, and most notably, flambéing. This marked the emergence of guéridon service. The Edwardian era (1901–1910) was a key period for its popularization, mainly due to the perceived extravagance of flambéing.

=== Modern revival ===
After a decline in the late 20th century due to rising costs and a shift toward casual dining, guéridon service experienced a revival, as part of the rising modern "experience economy".

Many contemporary restaurants have adopted a curated approach, focusing on one or two signature tableside preparations rather than an extensive menu, allowing them to advertise and exhibit guéridon service to customers seeking it, while minimizing operational costs.

== Operations ==
=== Equipment ===
A specialized set of equipment, often called the armamentarium, is used in tableside preparation. The trolley functions as a mobile workstation designed to extend kitchen utility into dining environments.

==== The guéridon trolley ====
The modern guéridon trolley is a movable sideboard, often with a stainless steel top for hygiene and fire resistance. Many trolleys incorporate a gas burner, a cutting board, and drawers or a cupboard for ingredients and service equipment such as condiments, liquor, cream, butter, oil, knives, spoons, and platters. In many establishments, a fleet of specialized trolleys is used for different functions:

- Salad trolley: outfitted for the tableside composition of salads like Caesar salad.
- Carving and flambé trolley: featuring integrated heating units for cooking and carving.
- Cheese trolley: often has a marble surface and a dome to present a selection of cheeses.
- Liqueur and dessert trolley: displays pastries or is stocked with spirits, liqueurs, and glassware for after-dinner service.

Essential guéridon equipment and function
Category	Item	Description and function	Associated tasks
Trolleys	Carving/flambé trolley	The primary workstation, equipped with burners (réchaud), a carving board, and storage	Steak Diane, crêpes Suzette, carving roasts
Trolleys	Salad trolley	Equipped with bowls, plates, and ingredients for tableside salad preparation.	Caesar salad
Trolleys	Cheese trolley	Features a marble top and dome cover for presenting and serving a variety of cheeses.	Cheese course service
Heating	Réchaud (flare lamp or gas burner)	The heating unit on the trolley used for cooking, heating, or flambéing. It has been known to require extensive maintenance efforts to remove soot.	All hot preparations, flambéing
Cookware	Suzette pan	A shallow, often silver-plated copper pan, utilised for even heat distribution.	Crêpes Suzette, steak Diane
Cookware	Chafing dish	A container used to keep food warm, often positioned under a carving board.	Storage of food before serving
Utensils	Carving knife and fork	Long, sharp knife and a two-pronged fork for slicing meat, poultry, and ham.	Carving roasts, turkey, ham
Utensils	Fish knife and slice	Specialized cutlery for filleting and serving whole cooked fish.	Filleting fish
Utensils	Service spoon and fork	The primary tools for plating food from a platter to the guest's plate.	Serving food to customers

==== Personnel ====
Guéridon service typically has a two-person team for each station.

- Chef de rang (station head waiter): The senior team member who takes the lead. This person greets guests, takes orders, and performs the tableside preparations. The chef de rang is usually the person who performs most of the theatrics during guéridon service.
- Commis de rang (assistant waiter): The junior waiter who assists the chef de rang. Their duties include bringing food from the kitchen, clearing plates, and ensuring the guéridon is adequately stocked and prepared, essentially being an assistant to the chef de rang.

=== Signature dishes ===
Guéridon service commonly will be offered for certain dishes more than others (as the signature dish of guéridon service). Examples include:

- Steak Diane: A pan-fried beefsteak served with a sauce made from the pan juices and flambéed with brandy. Its origins are disputed, likely emerging in London or Ostend in the 1930s before gaining fame in New York City. The name is an allusion to Diana, the Roman goddess of the hunt.
- Crêpes Suzette: Thin crêpes served in a sauce of caramelized sugar, butter, orange juice, and an orange-flavored liqueur (Grand Marnier or Cointreau), which is then flambéed. Its disputed origin is most famously attributed to an accidental ignition of the liquor by Henri Charpentier in Monte Carlo in 1895.
- Bananas Foster: A dessert made from bananas and a sauce of butter, brown sugar, and cinnamon, flambéed with banana liqueur and dark rum, and served over vanilla ice cream. It was created in 1951 at Brennan's restaurant in New Orleans by owner Owen Brennan's sister, Ella Brennan, and chef Paul Blangé. The dish was named after Richard Foster, a regular customer and chairman of the New Orleans Crime Commission.
- Caesar salad: A salad of romaine lettuce and croutons tossed in a dressing of egg yolk, olive oil, Parmesan cheese, lemon juice, and Worcestershire sauce. It was invented on July 4, 1924, by Italian restaurateur Caesar Cardini at his restaurant in Tijuana, Mexico.

== See also ==
- Teppanyaki
- History of restaurants
