= Long Island iced tea =

Mixed drink with vodka, gin, tequila, and rum

Long Island Iced Tea
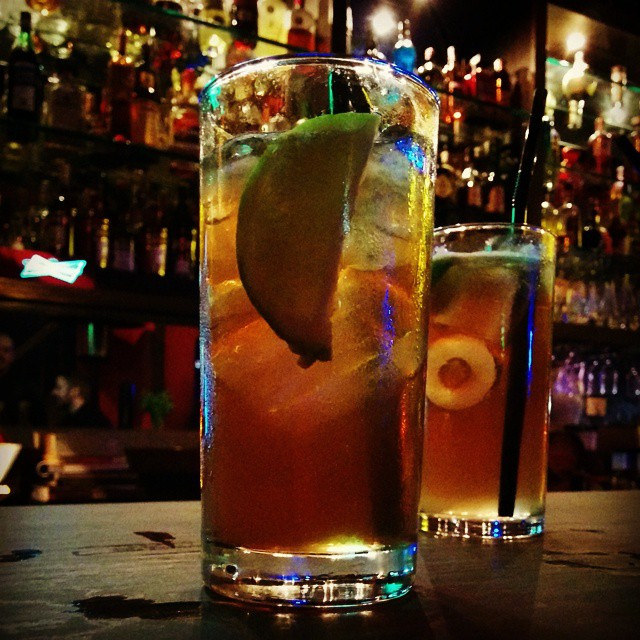
- The Long Island iced tea was named for its visual resemblance to non-alcoholic iced tea.
- Type: Cocktail
- Ingredients: 15 ml tequila; 15 ml vodka; 15 ml white rum; 15 ml Cointreau; 15 ml gin; 25 ml lemon juice; 30 ml simple syrup; Top with cola
- Standard drinkware: Highball glass
- Standard garnish: Lemon slice (optional)
- Served: On the rocks: poured over ice
- Preparation: Add all ingredients into highball glass filled with ice. Stir gently. Optionally garnish with lemon slice.

The Long Island iced tea, or Long Island ice tea, is an IBA official cocktail, typically made with vodka, tequila, white rum, Cointreau, gin, and a splash of cola. Despite its name, the cocktail does not typically contain iced tea, but is named due to having a similar amber hue as iced tea.

The drink has a much higher alcohol concentration (approximately 22 percent) than most highball drinks due to the relatively small amount of mixer.

== Origin ==
There are two competing origin stories for the Long Island iced tea, one from Long Island, Tennessee, and one from Long Island, New York.

Robert "Rosebud" Butt claims to have invented the Long Island iced tea as an entry in a contest to create a new mixed drink with triple sec in 1972 while he worked at the Oak Beach Inn on Long Island, New York.

A slightly different drink is claimed to have been invented in the 1920s during the Prohibition era by an "Old Man Bishop" in a local community named Long Island in Kingsport, Tennessee. The drink was then tweaked by Ransom Bishop, Old Man Bishop's son, by adding cola, lemon, and lime. Old Man's version included whiskey, maple syrup, varied quantities of the five liquors, and no triple sec, rather than the modern one with cola and five equal portions of the five liquors. It was prepared in the following way:

- Squeeze 1/2 a fresh lemon and 1/2 a fresh lime into a 16 US fl oz (470 ml) glass
- Add 1/2 US fl oz (15 ml) rum, 1/2 oz. gin, 1/2 oz tequila, 1 US fl oz (30 ml) vodka, 1 oz. whiskey, and 1/2 oz. maple syrup
- Mix, then add 4 US fl oz (120 ml) of cola

It is unknown what the quantities of the original recipe were, when and how it was changed, and how and why the varied alcoholic ingredients were distilled all in the same place or otherwise acquired during Prohibition.

While some sources say there was a recipe for Long Island iced tea in the 1961 edition of Betty Crocker's New Picture Cook Book, no such recipe can actually be found there.

== Reception ==
The cocktail is considered a favorite of university students in the United States and it has thus garnered negative connotations as "an act of mixological atrocity favored by college students and wastrels", in the words of one food critic.

The cocktail's flavor has been described as "bright and refreshing". It is easy to drink, making it "dangerously boozy".

== Recipes and variations ==
The International Bartenders Association (IBA)'s recipe calls for equal parts vodka, tequila, white rum, Cointreau, gin, 2 parts lemon juice, 1 1/3 syrup topped with cola. After stirring gently, the drink may also be garnished with a lemon slice. Robert Butt's recipe uses sour mix instead of lemon juice and simple syrup, and he has stated that only a small amount of Coca-Cola is used, to give color. A more complex recipe published by The New York Times differs from the IBA recipe in that it uses maple syrup instead of simple syrup, uses both lemon and lime juice, and adds salt.

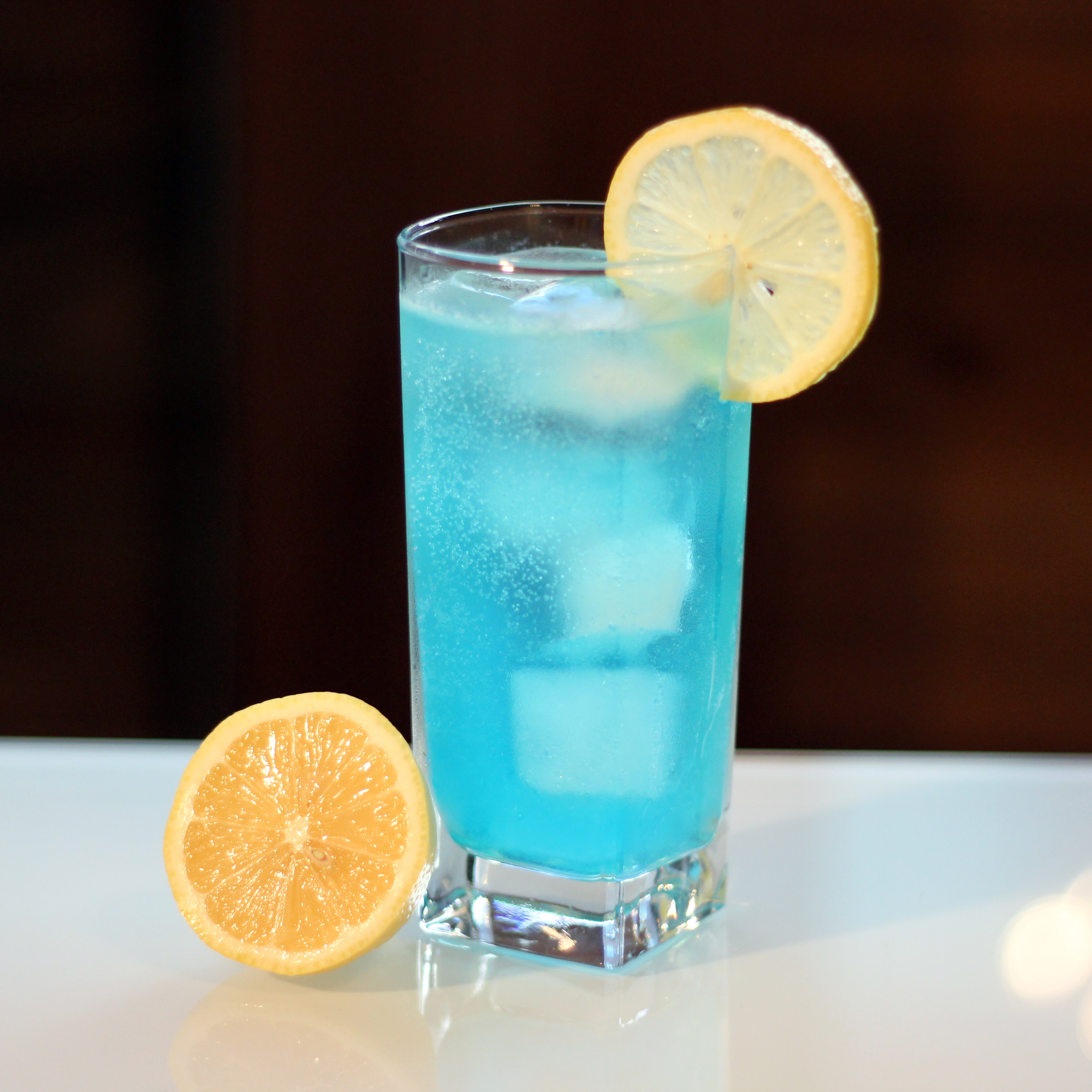
Adios Motherfucker, made with blue curaçao

However, there are many similar cocktails due to the popularity of the cocktail and the large number of ingredients that can be substituted with alternatives. Some variations include:

- Boston Tea Party, also called a Walk Me Down or an Adios Motherfucker, is a variation of the Long Island iced tea with blue curaçao substituting for the triple sec, and with lemon-lime soda substituting for the cola.
- Grateful Dead (also known as the Black Widow), which uses the same mix as a Long Island but the triple sec is replaced with raspberry liqueur and the cola with lemon-lime soda.
- Hawaiian iced tea is made by replacing the cola with pineapple juice.
- If cranberry juice is substituted for cola, the result is a Long Beach iced tea.
- If Midori is substituted in for the triple sec and lemon-lime soda replaces the Coca-Cola the result is a Tokyo iced tea, and has a greenish color.
- Tennessee tea replaces the gin with Tennessee whiskey and does not use tequila.
- Texas tea is created by adding whiskey.
