= Bacardi 151 =

Discontinued brand of highly alcoholic rum

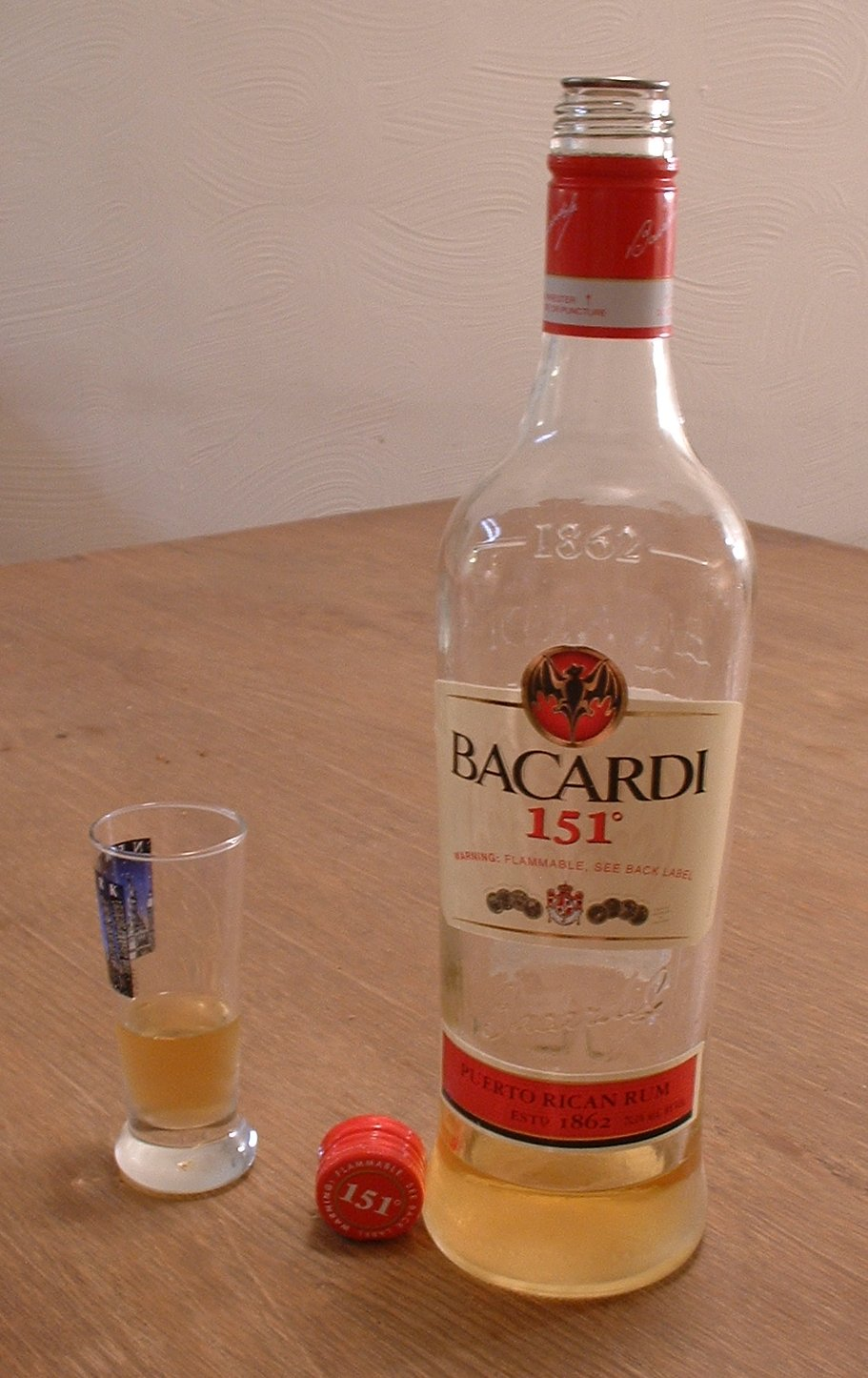
A partially filled bottle of Bacardi 151

Bacardi 151 was a brand of highly alcoholic rum made by Bacardi Limited of Hamilton, Bermuda. It is named for its alcohol concentration level of 151 U.S. proof, that is, 75.5% alcohol by volume. This is much higher than typical rum, which averages around 35%–40% alcohol by volume. Bacardi 151 was manufactured in Puerto Rico to be sold in the United States and Canada from at least 1963 until 2016, when its production was discontinued.

== Safety and lawsuits ==
Because of its high alcohol content, Bacardi 151 was particularly flammable among liquors. For this reason it was often used as the ignition source for "flaming shots" and even for at-home pyrotechnic stunts. The bottle carried a warning label advising consumers, among other things, "do not use this product for flaming dishes or other drinks." Bottles were also equipped with a stainless steel flame arrester crimped onto the neck of the bottle to prevent the rum inside the bottle from igniting. Nevertheless, Bacardi faced at least two lawsuits from consumers who claimed to have been badly injured by the product's flames.

Bacardi 151 was discontinued in 2016.

As of May 2026, the Bacardi website maintains a page dedicated to "The legend of Bacardi 151," and mentions the known flammability of the alcohol as a reason that the "situation escalated," but does not go into further detail. While the company never issued a formal statement regarding the product's discontinuation, it has been speculated that "it's a pretty good guess that Bacardi got sick of being sued."

== Mixed drinks ==
Bacardi 151 was typically used in sweet drinks, such as the Hurricane and Caribou Lou, which combine rum and fruit juices.

== See also ==
- List of Puerto Rican rums
