= Glycoside hydrolase family 1 =

Glycosyl hydrolase family 1
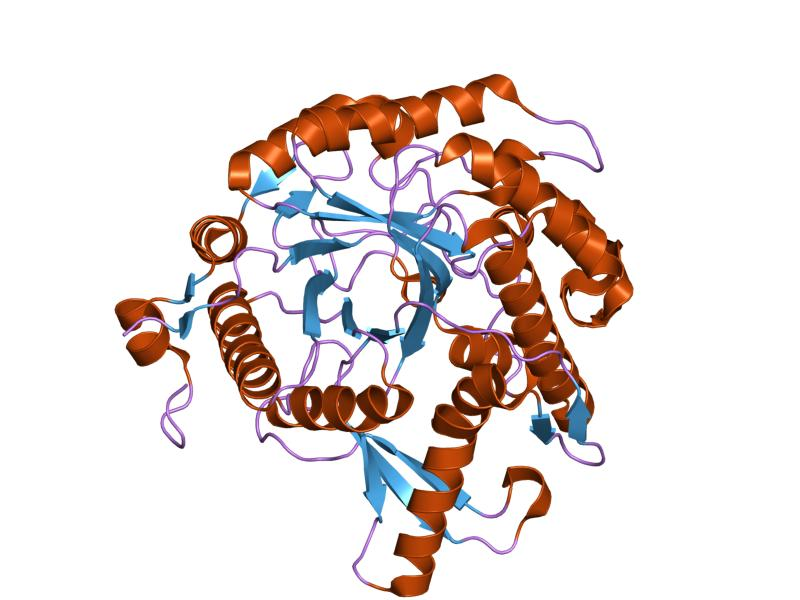

Identifiers
- Symbol: Glyco_hydro_1
- Pfam: PF00232
- Pfam clan: CL0058
- InterPro: IPR001360
- PROSITE: PDOC00495
- SCOP2: 1cbg / SCOPe / SUPFAM
- OPM superfamily: 117
- OPM protein: 3gnr
- Membranome: 522
Available protein structures:
- PDB: IPR001360 PF00232 (ECOD; PDBsum)
- AlphaFold: IPR001360; PF00232

Glycoside hydrolase family 1 is a family of glycoside hydrolases. Glycoside hydrolases EC 3.2.1. are a widespread group of enzymes that hydrolyse the glycosidic bond between two or more carbohydrates, or between a carbohydrate and a non-carbohydrate moiety. A classification system for glycoside hydrolases, based on sequence similarity, has led to the definition of >100 different families. This classification is available on the CAZy web site, and also discussed at CAZypedia, an online encyclopedia of carbohydrate active enzymes.

Glycoside hydrolase family 1 CAZY GH_1 comprises enzymes with a number of known activities; beta-glucosidase (EC 3.2.1.21); beta-galactosidase (EC 3.2.1.23); 6-phospho-beta-galactosidase (EC 3.2.1.85); 6-phospho-beta-glucosidase (EC 3.2.1.86); lactase-phlorizin hydrolase (EC 3.2.1.62), lactase (EC 3.2.1.108); beta-mannosidase (EC 3.2.1.25); myrosinase (EC 3.2.1.147).

== Subfamilies ==
- 6-phospho-beta-galactosidase InterPro: IPR005928

== Human proteins containing this domain ==
GBA3; KL; KLB; LCT; LCTL;
