= Amanda Swart =

South African biochemist

Amanda Cecilia Swart
- Education: Stellenbosch University
- Known for: Research into health benefits of rooibos
- Scientific career
- Fields: Biochemistry
- Workplaces: Stellenbosch University
- Thesis: MSc: A Biochemical Study of two natural products from Salsola Tuberculata (1986)

Amanda Cecilia Swart is a South African biochemist who holds a professorship in biochemistry at Stellenbosch University. She is known for her research on rooibos, a herbal tea popular in South Africa, has been funded by the South African Rooibos Council in her research, and is frequently quoted in South African media promoting the reported health benefits of rooibos.

== Education and career ==
Swart completed her MSc in Biology in 1986 and her doctorate at Stellenbosch in 1999, and returned to Stellenbosch as a faculty member in 2002, where she teaches undergraduate and postgraduate courses in biochemistry. She was instrumental in establishing the P450 Steroid Research Group at Stellenbosch and in 2011 she was appointed associate professor. Her research areas include: Adrenal steroidogenesis, cytochrome P450 enzymes, prostate cancer, and products derived from the plants Aspalatus linearis (Rooibos), Salsola tuberculatiformis Botch. (Gannabos) and Sutherlandia frutescens (Cancer bush).

== Research ==
Her primary research focus, and that of the P450 Steroid Research Group, is on the hormones (adrenal steroids) produced by the adrenal gland as well as on the steroidogenic enzymes which catalyse their biosynthesis, the metabolism of these steroids in prostate cancer, and their implications in endocrine disorders. Their research also involves the investigation of the effects of plant products on the endocrine system.

Swart's research has been sponsored by the National Research Foundation, Cancer Association of South Africa and the SA Rooibos Council.

The research is broken into three focus areas:

=== 11β-hydroxyandrostenedione ===
11β-hydroxyandrostenedione is an adrenal steroid and has been implicated in prostate cancer as well as castration-resistant prostate cancer. Swart investigates the mechanism of this steroid within prostate cancer cells and other cancer cells.

=== Rooibos ===
There are two avenues of research regarding rooibos that Swart is pursuing.

==== Prostate cancer metabolism ====
Swart's research has suggested that rooibos may have beneficial effects on prostate cancer by inhibiting 17β-Hydroxysteroid dehydrogenases and blocking dihydrotestosterone. Her research is also looking at the effect of rooibos on the PSA enzyme marker which is used as a test for prostate cancer.

==== Cortisol and stress ====
Her research has suggested that drinking rooibos may lower stress through the effects of two compounds in it, aspalathin and nothofagin. Under laboratory conditions these compounds block the production of a stress hormone, cortisol. She has claimed that rooibos has the potential to prevent heart disease, reduce the effects of aging, and promote weight loss.
