= C19H22O6 =

The molecular formula C_{19}H_{22}O_{6} (molar mass: 346.37 g/mol, exact mass: 346.141638 u) may refer to:

- Atrop-abyssomicin C
- Cynaropicrin, a bioactive sesquiterpene lactone
- Dihydrokanakugiol, a dihydrochalcone
- Gibberellic acid, a hormone found in plants
