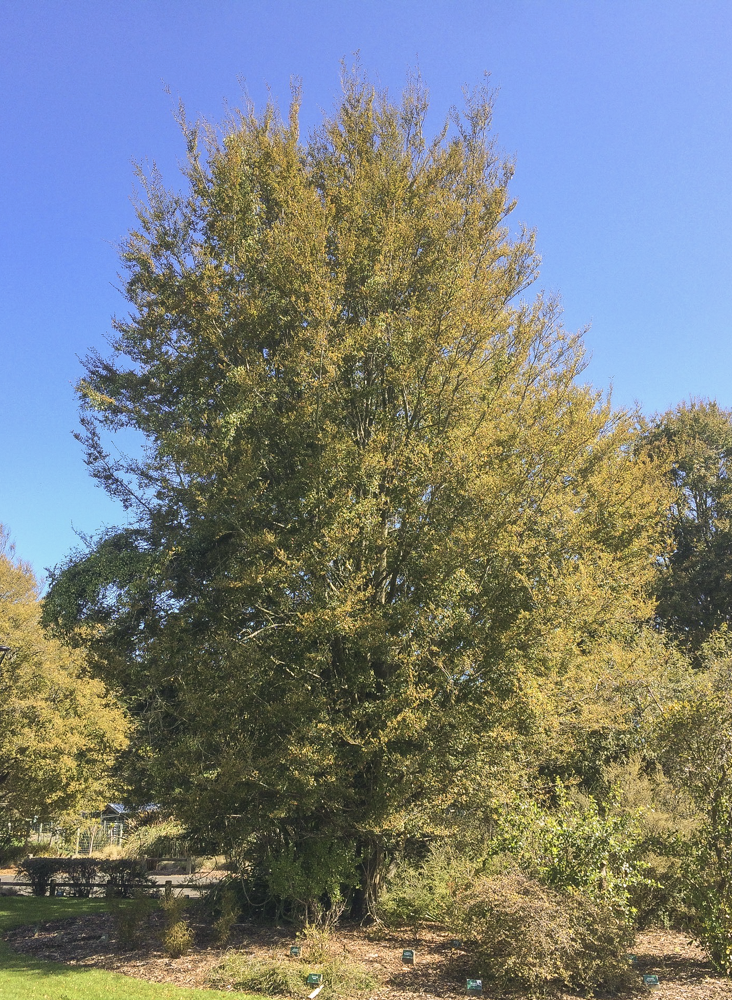
- Tree
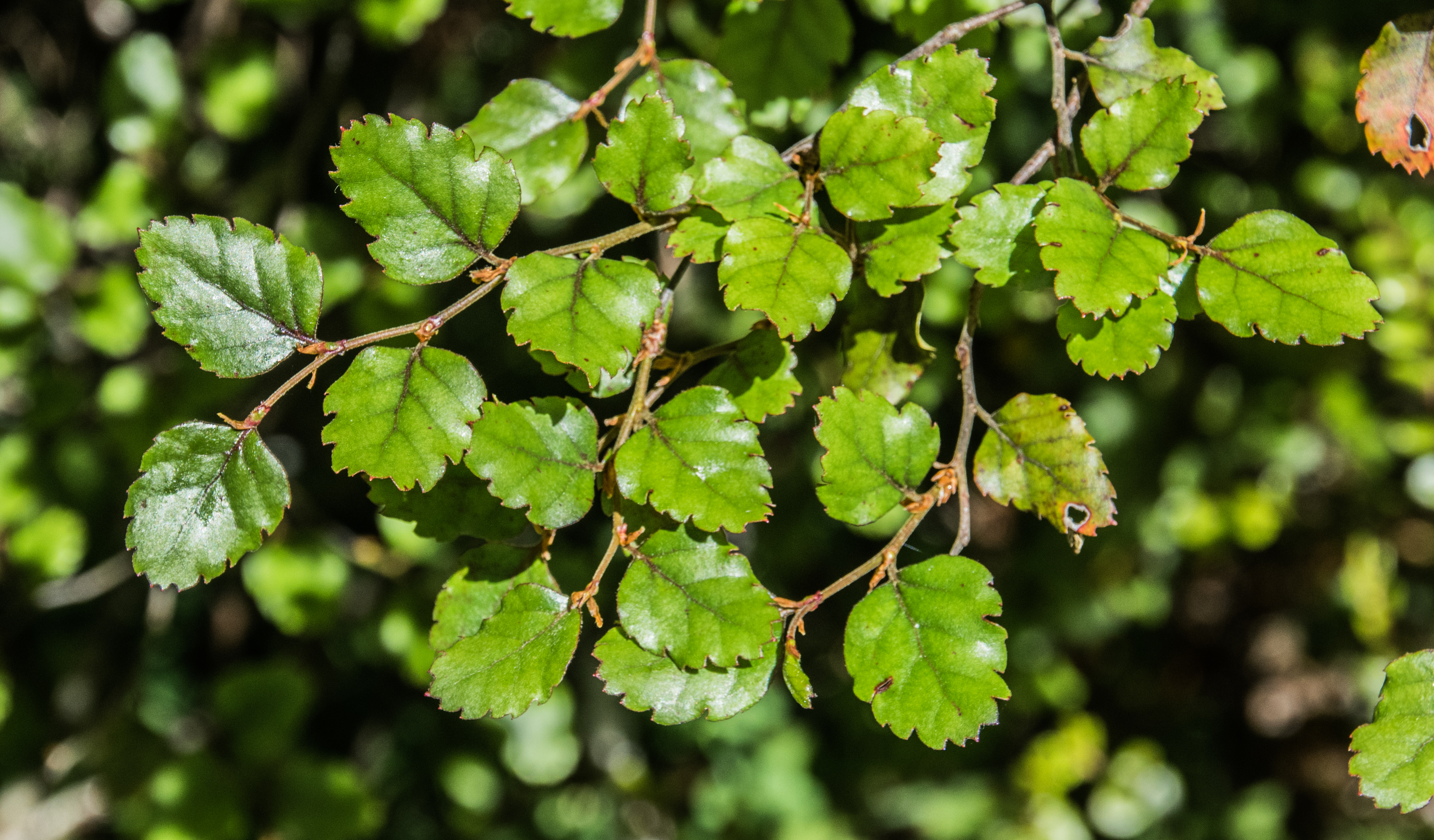
- Foliage

Conservation status
- Least Concern (IUCN 3.1)

Scientific classification
- Kingdom: Plantae
- Clade: Embryophytes
- Clade: Tracheophytes
- Clade: Spermatophytes
- Clade: Angiosperms
- Clade: Eudicots
- Clade: Rosids
- Order: Fagales
- Family: Nothofagaceae
- Genus: Nothofagus
- Subgenus: Nothofagus subg. Fuscospora
- Species: N. fusca

Binomial name
- Nothofagus fusca (Hook.f.) Oerst.

Synonyms
- Fagus fusca Hook.f.; Fuscospora fusca (Hook.f.) Heenan & Smissen

= Nothofagus fusca =

Species of tree

Nothofagus fusca, commonly known as red beech (Māori: tawhai raunui), is a species of southern beech, endemic to New Zealand, occurring on both the North and South Island. It is generally found on lower hills and inland valley floors where soil is fertile and well drained. In New Zealand the species is called Fuscospora fusca.

It is a medium-sized evergreen tree growing to 35 m tall. The leaves are alternately arranged, broad ovoid, 2 to 4 cm long and 1.5 to 3 cm broad, the margin distinctively double-toothed with each lobe bearing two teeth. The fruit is a small cupule containing three seeds.

Pollen from the tree was found near the Antarctic Peninsula, showing that it formerly grew in Antarctica since the Eocene period. Red beech is not currently considered threatened.

== Uses ==
Red beech is the only known plant source, apart from rooibos (Aspalathus linearis), of the C-linked dihydrochalcone glycoside nothofagin.

It is also grown as an ornamental tree in regions with a mild oceanic climate due to its attractive leaf shape. It has been planted in Scotland and the North Coast of the Pacific of the United States. The red beech's wood is the most durable of all the New Zealand beeches. It was often used in flooring in many parts of New Zealand. The timber is exceptionally stable when dried to appropriate moisture values. The average density of red beech at 12 percent moisture content is 630 kilograms per cubic metre.

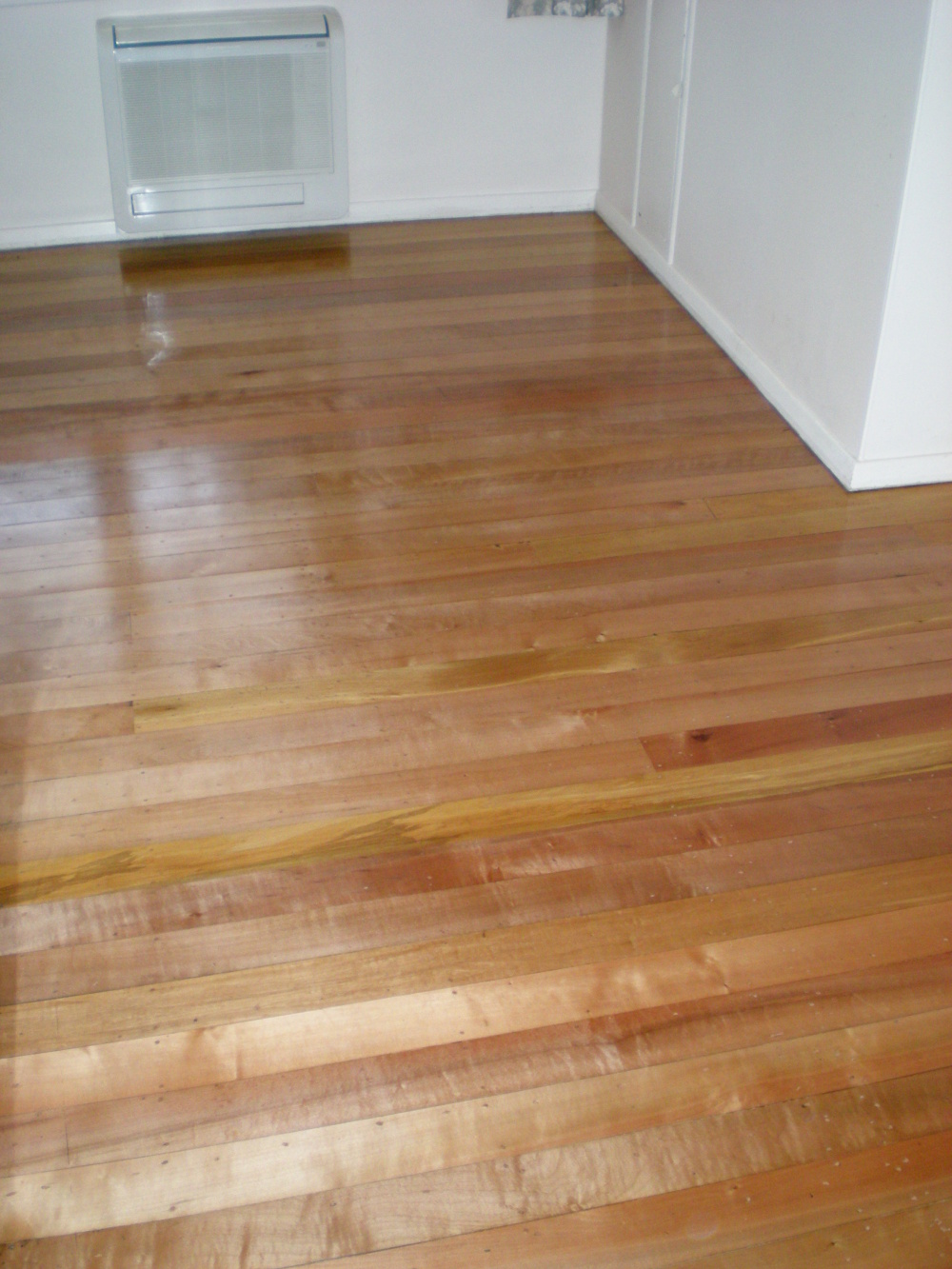
Red beech flooring in Nelson, New Zealand

== Hybrids ==
- Red beech hybridises with mountain beech (Nothofagus cliffortioides) to form the hybrid species Nothofagus ×blairii.
- Red beech hybridises with black beech (Nothofagus solandri) to form the hybrid species Nothofagus ×dubia.
- Red beech hybridises with the ruil tree (Nothofagus alessandrii) from Chile to form the hybrid species Nothofagus ×eugenananus.
