= Phlorizin =

Names
- IUPAC name 1-[2-(β-D-Glucopyranosyloxy)-4,6-dihydroxyphenyl]-3-(4-hydroxyphenyl)propan-1-one
- Systematic IUPAC name 1-(2,4-Dihydroxy-6-{[(2S,3R,4S,5S,6R)-3,4,5-trihydroxy-6-(hydroxymethyl)oxan-2-yl]oxy}phenyl)-3-(4-hydroxyphenyl)propan-1-one
- Other names Isosalipurposide

Identifiers
CAS Number	60-81-1
3D model (JSmol)	Interactive image
ChEBI	CHEBI:8113
ChEMBL	ChEMBL245067
ChemSpider	16498836
ECHA InfoCard	100.000.443
IUPHAR/BPS	4757
PubChem CID	6072
UNII	CU9S17279X
CompTox Dashboard (EPA)	DTXSID3075339
- InChI: InChI=1S/C21H24O10/c22-9-16-18(27)19(28)20(29)21(31-16)30-15-8-12(24)7-14(26)17(15)13(25)6-3-10-1-4-11(23)5-2-10/h1-2,4-5,7-8,16,18-24,26-29H,3,6,9H2/t16-,18-,19+,20-,21-/m1/s1 Key: IOUVKUPGCMBWBT-QNDFHXLGSA-N
- SMILES: c1cc(ccc1CCC(=O)c2c(cc(cc2O[C@H]3[C@@H]([C@H]([C@@H]([C@H](O3)CO)O)O)O)O)O)O

Properties
Chemical formula	C_{21}H_{24}O_{10}
Molar mass	436.413 g·mol^{−1}
Appearance	White solid
Melting point	106 to 109 °C (223 to 228 °F; 379 to 382 K)
Boiling point	200 °C (392 °F; 473 K) decomposition
Solubility in water	water, low MW alcohols
- Except where otherwise noted, data are given for materials in their standard state (at 25 °C [77 °F], 100 kPa). verify (what is ?) Infobox references

Phlorizin is a glucoside of phloretin, a dihydrochalcone. A white solid when pure, samples often appear yellow due to impurities. It is of sweet taste and contains four molecules of water in the crystal. It is poorly soluble in ether and cold water, but soluble in ethanol and hot water. Upon prolonged exposure to aqueous solutions, phlorizin hydrolyzes to phloretin and glucose.

== Occurrence ==
Phlorizin is found primarily in unripe Malus (apple) root bark of apple, and trace amounts have been found in strawberry. In Malus, it is most abundant in vegetative tissues (such as leaves and bark) and seeds. Closely related species, such as pear (Pyrus communis), cherry, and other fruit trees in the Rosaceae do not contain phlorizin. Phlorizin is a phytochemical that belongs to the class of polyphenols. In natural sources, it may occur with other polyphenols such as quercetin, catechin, epicatechin, procyanidins, and rutin.

== Pharmacology ==
Phlorizin is an inhibitor of SGLT1 and SGLT2 because it competes with D-glucose for binding to the carrier; this action reduces renal glucose transport, lowering the amount of glucose in the blood. Phlorizin was studied as a potential pharmaceutical treatment for type 2 diabetes, but has since been superseded by more selective and more promising synthetic analogs, such as empagliflozin, canagliflozin and dapagliflozin. Phlorizin is not an effective drug because when orally consumed, it is nearly entirely converted into phloretin by hydrolytic enzymes in the small intestine.
