= C19H21N =

The molecular formula C_{19}H_{21}N (molar mass: 263.38 g/mol, exact mass: 263.1674 u) may refer to:

- Indriline
- Nortriptyline
- Pridefine (AHR-1,118)
- Protriptyline
