= Red espresso =

South African manufacturer of Rooibos tea products

red espresso
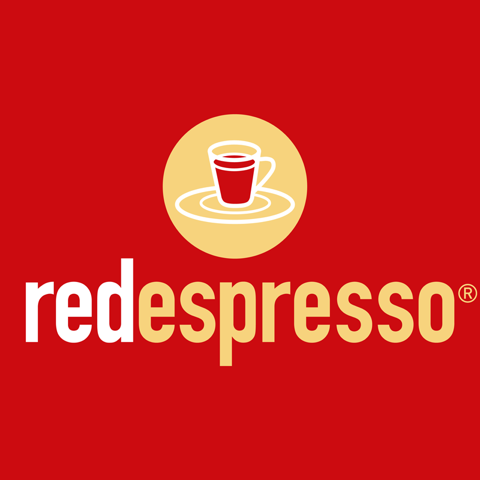

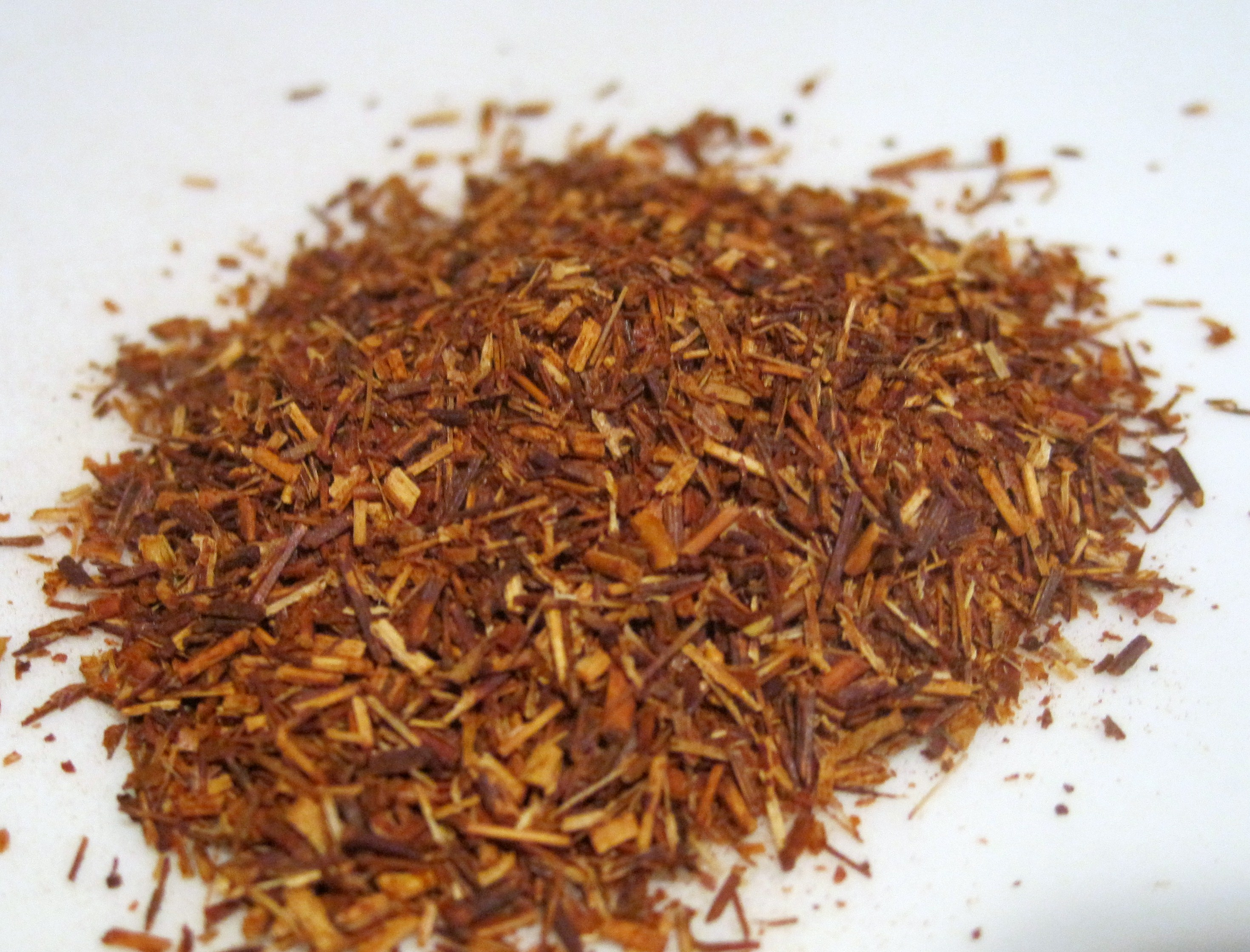
- Type: Company
- Founded: 2005/08/22 in Cape Town, Western Cape, South Africa
- Founders: Pete and Monique Ethelston, Carl Pretorius
- Headquarters: 30 Zandwyk Park, Old Paarl Road, Paarl, South Africa
- Products: Pre-ground Rooibos tea in loose grind, pods and capsules for all coffee appliances.
- Website: www.redespresso.com

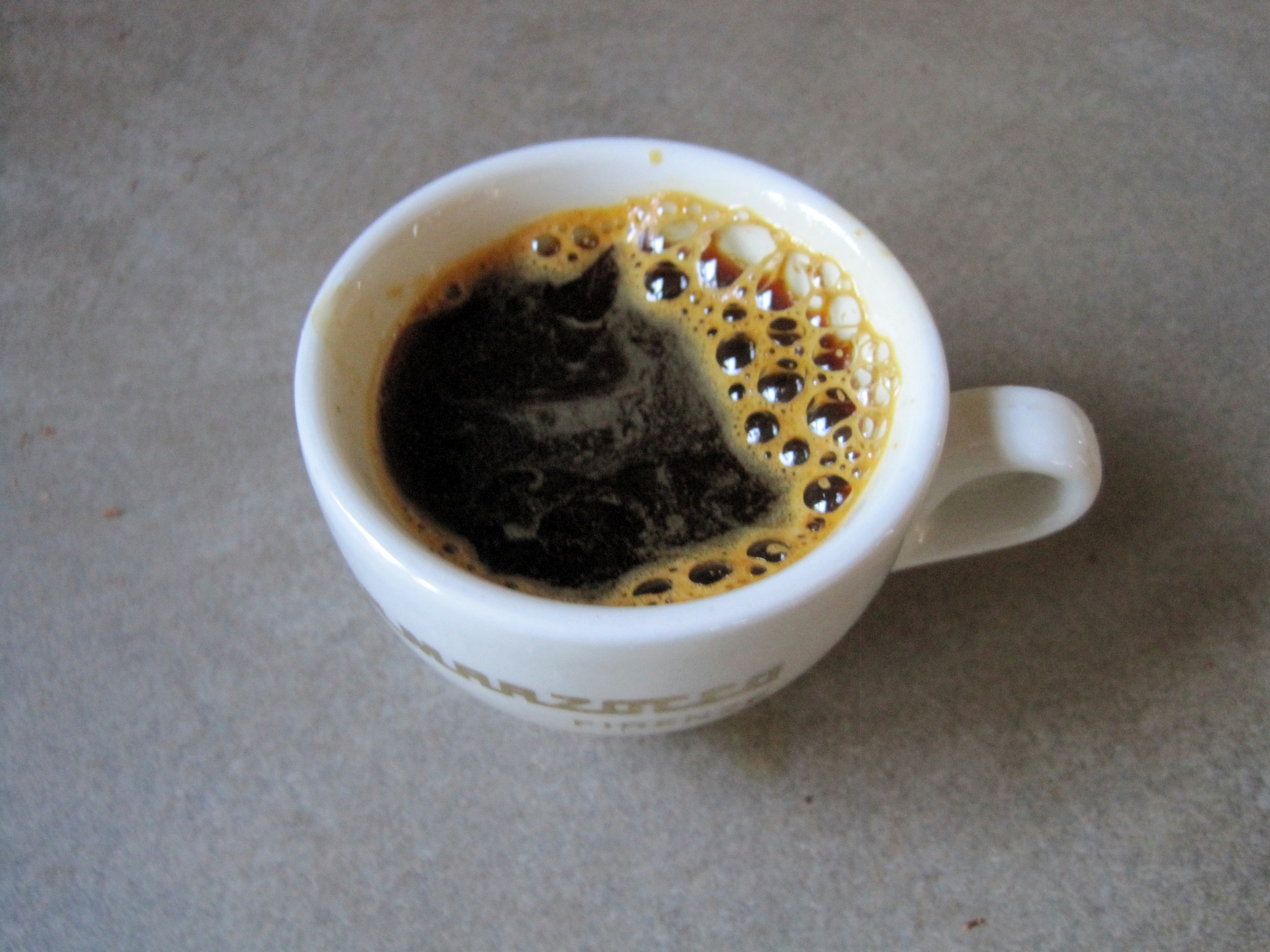
Red espresso tea

Red espresso (stylised as red espresso) is the brand name of The Red Espresso Company Pty Ltd, a South African manufacturer of Rooibos tea products. The company was founded by Pete and Monique Ethelston and Carl Pretorius in 2005, when Carl invented a way to express a shot of Rooibos tea on an espresso machine as a caffeine-free alternative to coffee.

== Product ==
Red espresso is packaged as pre-ground Rooibos tea, pods, and capsules and can be made on all coffee appliances, such as espresso machines, stovetop espresso makers, drip filter machines, Nespresso machines, and French presses.

Promoted as "An Espresso Made from Tea", red espresso is made from naturally caffeine-free Rooibos tea leaves that have been ground finer to work on a coffee appliance. When expressed, it has a strong colour and flavour, coated with a crema, just like coffee. It is used to make cappuccinos, lattes, and iced teas.

== Awards ==
So far, red espresso has won five awards, including:

- World Tea Expo Top 10 New Products
- Food Review/Symrise New Product of the Year 2006
- IUFOST Global Food Award for Product Innovation 2008
- Marketing Excellence Award
- Best New Product – Specialty Beverage Award 2008/9" from The Specialty Coffee Association of America (SCAA)

It made history as the first tea ever to win in the Specialty Beverage Category and also the first South African Company to win at SCAA

== Drinks ==
- Red cappuccino
- Red latte
- Fresh red iced tea

== See also ==
- Rooibos
