= Cederberg Tea House =

Tea house in Seattle, Washington, United States

Cederberg Tea House was a South African tea shop located in the Queen Anne neighborhood of Seattle, Washington. Cederberg Tea House was named after the Cederberg region of South Africa, where the rooibos plant is primarily grown.

Cederberg Tea House was founded by a mother/daughter duo from Johannesburg, South Africa in 2013, and gained popularity as the only South African tea shop in Seattle, Washington. The rooibos style of tea and espresso made it a popular location in the Seattle coffee scene.

Cederberg Tea House closed in 2018 when the owners moved back to Johannesburg, South Africa. However, its traditional South African rooibos tea style was kept alive by Koku, the Japanese cafe and market that replaced it.
