= Phloretin =

Names
- Preferred IUPAC name 3-(4-Hydroxyphenyl)-1-(2,4,6-trihydroxyphenyl)propan-1-one
- Other names Dihydronaringenin; Phloretol

Identifiers
CAS Number	60-82-2
3D model (JSmol)	Interactive image
ChEBI	CHEBI:17276
ChemSpider	4624
ECHA InfoCard	100.000.444
IUPHAR/BPS	4285
KEGG	C00774
PubChem CID	4788
UNII	S5J5OE47MK
CompTox Dashboard (EPA)	DTXSID6022393
- InChI: InChI=1S/C15H14O5/c16-10-4-1-9(2-5-10)3-6-12(18)15-13(19)7-11(17)8-14(15)20/h1-2,4-5,7-8,16-17,19-20H,3,6H2 Key: VGEREEWJJVICBM-UHFFFAOYSA-N; InChI=1/C15H14O5/c16-10-4-1-9(2-5-10)3-6-12(18)15-13(19)7-11(17)8-14(15)20/h1-2,4-5,7-8,16-17,19-20H,3,6H2 Key: VGEREEWJJVICBM-UHFFFAOYAB
- SMILES: C1=CC(=CC=C1CCC(=O)C2=C(C=C(C=C2O)O)O)O

Properties
Chemical formula	C_{15}H_{14}O_{5}
Molar mass	274.272 g·mol^{−1}
- Except where otherwise noted, data are given for materials in their standard state (at 25 °C [77 °F], 100 kPa). verify (what is ?) Infobox references

Phloretin is a dihydrochalcone, a type of natural phenol. It can be found in apple tree leaves and the Manchurian apricot.

== Metabolism ==
In rats, ingested phlorizin is converted into phloretin by hydrolytic enzymes in the small intestine. Phloretin hydrolase hydrolyses phloretin into phloretic acid and phloroglucinol.

== Pharmacological research ==
In an animal model, phloretin inhibited active transport of glucose into cells by SGLT1 and SGLT2, though the inhibition is weaker than by its glycoside phlorizin. An important effect of this is the inhibition of glucose absorption by the small intestine and the inhibition of renal glucose reabsorption. Phloretin also inhibits a variety of urea transporters. It induces urea loss and diuresis when coupled with high protein diets. Phloretin has been found to inhibit weight gain and improve metabolic homeostasis in mice fed with high-fat diet. Phloretin inhibits aquaporin 9 (AQP9) on mouse hepatocytes.

== Nanoparticle synthesis ==
Phloretin functionalized gold-nanoparticles (Pht-GNPs) were synthesized using a single-step synthesis method and tested for its anticancer activity. Pht-GNPs showed significant cancer cell toxicities compared to free phloretin.

== Glycosides ==
- Phlorizin is the 2'-glucoside of phloretin
- Naringin dihydrochalcone is a diglycoside of phloretin

== See also ==
- Phloretin-glucosidase
