= Nothofagin =

Names
- IUPAC name 2',4,4',6'-Tetrahydroxy-3-C-β-D-glucopyranosyldihydrochalcone

Identifiers
CAS Number	11023-94-2
3D model (JSmol)	Interactive image
ChEMBL	ChEMBL4082869
ChemSpider	10306387
PubChem CID	21722188
CompTox Dashboard (EPA)	DTXSID401027257
- InChI: InChI=1S/C21H24O10/c22-8-14-17(27)19(29)20(30)21(31-14)16-13(26)7-12(25)15(18(16)28)11(24)6-3-9-1-4-10(23)5-2-9/h1-2,4-5,7,14,17,19-23,25-30H,3,6,8H2/t14-,17-,19+,20-,21+/m1/s1 Key: VZBPTZZTCBNBOZ-VJXVFPJBSA-N; InChI=1/C21H24O10/c22-8-14-17(27)19(29)20(30)21(31-14)16-13(26)7-12(25)15(18(16)28)11(24)6-3-9-1-4-10(23)5-2-9/h1-2,4-5,7,14,17,19-23,25-30H,3,6,8H2/t14-,17-,19+,20-,21+/m1/s1 Key: VZBPTZZTCBNBOZ-VJXVFPJBBW
- SMILES: O[C@H]1[C@H](O)[C@@H](O)[C@@H](O[C@@H]1CO)c3c(O)cc(O)c(C(=O)CCc2ccc(O)cc2)c3O

Properties
Chemical formula	C_{21}H_{24}O_{10}
Molar mass	436.413 g·mol^{−1}
- Except where otherwise noted, data are given for materials in their standard state (at 25 °C [77 °F], 100 kPa). verify (what is ?) Infobox references

Nothofagin is a dihydrochalcone. It is a C-linked phloretin glucoside found in rooibos (Aspalathus linearis) and New Zealand red beech (Nothofagus fusca). It is a phenolic antioxidant.
