= Rooibos wine =

Rooibos wine is a variety of wine in which wood from the rooibos (Aspalathus linearis) and honeybush (Cyclopia spp.) plants is used instead of the traditional oak wood during the maturation phase. It has its origin in the Western Cape, South Africa. The wine has a unique flavor component and due to the anti-oxidative effect of the plants can be produced without the use of sulfur dioxide.

== Production ==
Fresh rooibos has a high antioxidant content (particularly vitamin C) and a relatively low tannin content, making it a potential alternative to the use of sulfur dioxide in the preservation of wine along with honeybush. During the maturation phase of rooibos wine, the wood of rooibos (Aspalathus linearis) and honeybush (Cyclopia spp.) is used instead of the traditional oak. Studies at the University of Stellenbosch showed that treatment with rooibos and honeybush plant material protects red wine from the negative effects associated with exposure to oxygen making sulfur dioxide unnecessary. The use of rooibos and honeybush plant material as a preservative in the production of red wine has been patented. The rooibos wine product is free of SO_{2} and has a unique flavour profile that can be ascribed to the aging of the wine in rooibos and honeybush wood.

== Notable brands ==
The Stellenbosch-based Audacia produced the first rooibos wine – a Merlot – in South Africa in 2013 . Their rooibos product range has since expanded to include Cabernet Sauvignon, Shiraz, a Red Blend and a White Blend. KWV South Africa (Pty) LTD followed in 2014 with a rooibos Pinotage under their Earth’s Essence brand.
