= Lindera lucida =

Conservation status
- Least Concern (IUCN 3.1)

Scientific classification
- Kingdom: Plantae
- Clade: Embryophytes
- Clade: Tracheophytes
- Clade: Angiosperms
- Clade: Magnoliids
- Order: Laurales
- Family: Lauraceae
- Genus: Lindera
- Species: L. lucida

Binomial name
- Lindera lucida (Blume) Boerl. Handl. FI. Ned. Ind. 3 (1900) 147.

Synonyms
- Aperula lucida (Blume) Blume; Benzoin lucidum (Blume) Kuntze; Cylicodaphne lucida (Blume) Blume; Litsea lucida Blume; Malapoenna lucidissima Kuntze; Polyadenia lucida (Blume) Nees

Species of flowering plant

Lindera lucida is a species of flowering plant in the family Lauraceae. It is a tree native to Assam in northeastern India, Peninsular Malaysia, and Sumatra. It grows in lowland and lower montane rain forests up to 1,200 metres (3,900 ft) elevation.

The species was first described as Litsea lucida by Carl Ludwig Blume in 1826. In 1900 Jacob Gijsbert Boerlage placed the species in genus Lindera as L. lucida.

Dihydrochalcones (3′,5′-dihydroxy-2′,4′,6′-trimethoxydihydrochalcone, methyl linderone, 5-hydroxy-6,7,8-trimethoxyflavone (alnetin) and 2′-hydroxy-3′,4′,5′,6′-tetramethoxydihydrochalcone (dihydrokanakugiol) can be found in twigs of L. lucida.
