= BOS Ice Tea =

South African brand of ice tea

BOS Brands (Pty) Ltd
- Type: Public
- Founded: 2010
- Founder: Grant Rushmere, Richard Bowsher
- Headquarters: Woodstock, Cape Town, South Africa
- Area served: South Africa, Europe, Asia, United States
- Key people: Grant Rushmere, Richard Bowsher, David Evans
- Website: www.bosicetea.com

BOS is a South African based ice tea brand that uses organic rooibos as the primary ingredient. The company was established by Grant Rushmere and Richard Bowsher, a rooibos tea farmer and an entrepreneur, respectively. The initial selection of ice teas was introduced in June 2010. BOS's headquarters are situated in Woodstock, Cape Town. Alex Ferguson, former manager of Manchester United F.C., is listed as an investor.

== Sustainability ==
BOS plants and maintains one tree for every 2,000 units sold. As of January 2019 the company has planted over 20,000 trees in leafless areas of South Africa.

== Products ==
The rooibos used in BOS is sourced from Klip Op Mekaar Rooibos Farm in the Cederberg Mountains in the Western Cape. The ice tea is made in six flavors:

- Lemon
- Peach
- Berry
- Ginger
- Yuzu
- Lime

BOS Sport, a sports drink range, was launched in January 2014 with four flavors:

- Lemon Lime
- Mandarin Orange
- Red Berry
- Blueberry

== Distribution ==
Since its launch in mid-2010, BOS has become popular in South Africa, and is now on sale in most retail outlets nationwide. In 2013, BOS launched in Belgium and the Netherlands, and plans to further expand into other African countries. Since mid 2015, BOS is also available in Singapore and the rest of Southeast Asia. In 2018, BOS made its United States market debut by launching in California.
