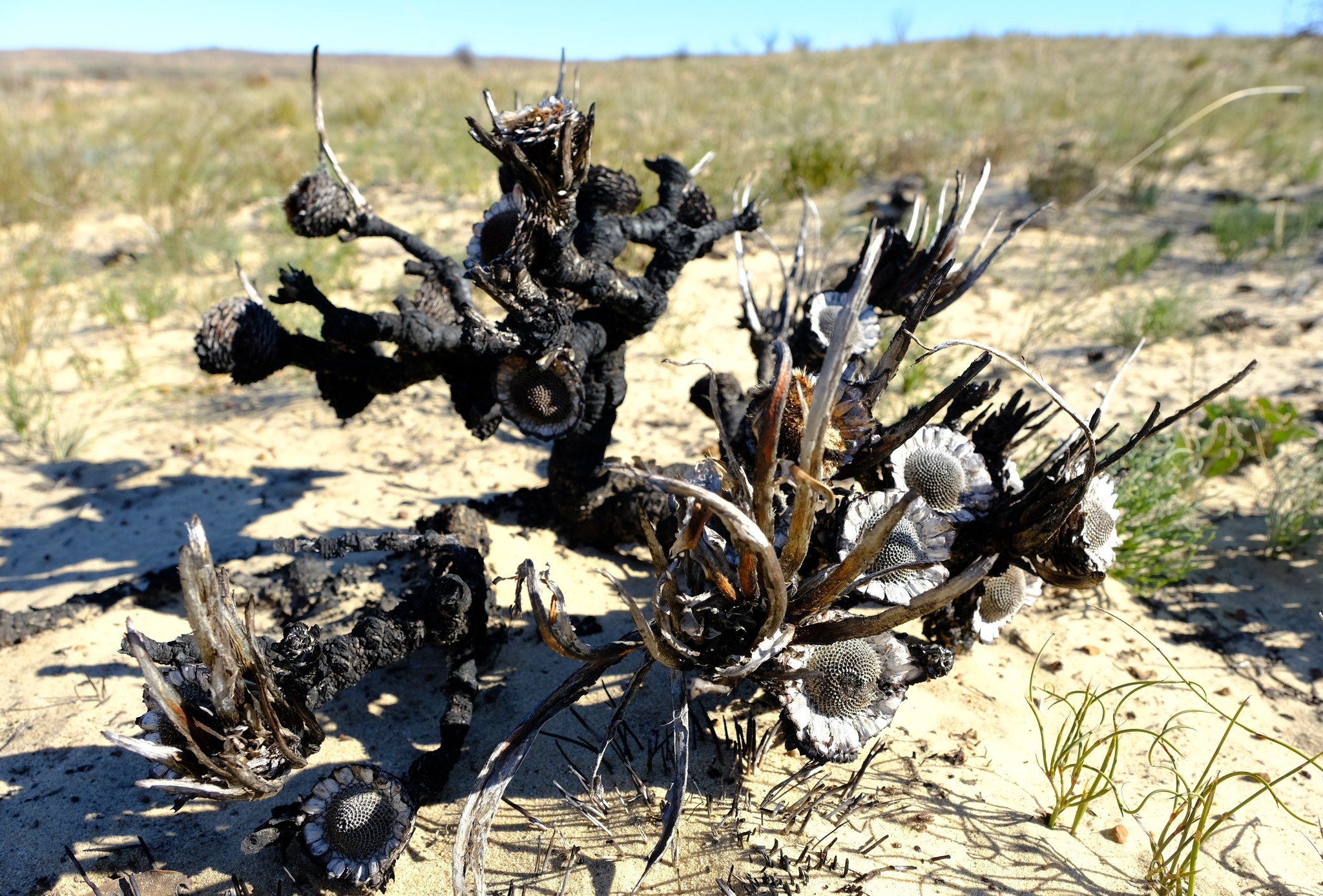

Conservation status
- Vulnerable (IUCN 3.1)

Scientific classification
- Kingdom: Plantae
- Clade: Embryophytes
- Clade: Tracheophytes
- Clade: Angiosperms
- Clade: Eudicots
- Order: Proteales
- Family: Proteaceae
- Genus: Protea
- Species: P. convexa

Binomial name
- Protea convexa E.Phillips
- Protea convexa distribution Extant (resident)

= Protea convexa =

Large-leaf sugarbush

Species of flowering plant

Protea convexa, also known as large-leaf sugarbush, is a rare flowering shrub in the genus Protea of the family Proteaceae, which is endemic to the southwestern Cape Region of South Africa.

== Taxonomy ==
The first person who is known to have collected Protea convexa was the German explorer Rudolf Marloth on plains near Matjiesfontein in September 1903. Marloth's collection of a pressed specimen (#3209) was sent to and arrived at the Kew Herbarium in 1904, where it has been housed ever since. Based on this specimen, in 1910 the South African botanist Edwin Percy Phillips then described it as a new species. Phillips did not designate holotypes in his paper, but in 1960 the South African botanist Hedley Brian Rycroft designated Marloth's specimen as such. The specific epithet refers to the shape of the receptacle, the bottom of the flower head.

== Description ==
This is a flat, prostrate shrub, although it has been said to grow up to 10 feet (3.0 m) high. On average, individual plants have a generation length of about 20 years. The leaves are very broad and large for a Protea, 5–9 inches (13–23 cm) in length and 2–3.5 inches (5.1–8.9 cm) broad at the widest point. The leaves are glaucous, glabrous and prominently veined. The flower heads are squat and compressed in shape, with a convex, hemispherical receptacle (the bottom of the structure). It is monoecious, both sexes occur in each flower. The seeds are stored in capsules, themselves stored in the dried old flower head.

=== Similar species ===
In his initial diagnosis, Phillips found it to be most similar to Protea acaulos, or at least what he called P. acaulis var. obovata, differing in the shape of the receptacle. It also has larger, glaucous leaves and a larger flower head.

== Distribution ==
This species is endemic to the Western Cape province of South Africa. It is specifically found in the northern Cederberg, Witteberg, Klein Swartberg, Elandsberg, and Tra-Tra mountain ranges. It can be found in the mountains above the Klein Karoo in the background of the village of Matjiesfontein.

== Ecology ==
The plant grows on the northern slopes of arid, rocky kloofs (dry ravines) at altitudes of 1,100 to 1,500 metres (3,600 to 4,900 ft). It exclusively grows in a fynbos habitat in the wild, in substrates derived from either sandstone or quartzite.

The adult specimens of this protea are killed when they are caught in the wildfires which periodically pass through the native habitat, but the seeds can survive such events. Its flowers bloom in Spring, from August to November, with the peak in October. Pollination occurs through the visits of either rats, mice, birds or insects. The seeds are stored in the fruit after becoming ripe, and the fruit are themselves stored in the old, dried, fire-resistant inflorescences, which are persistently retained on the plant after senescence. The inflorescences open one to two years after flowering after fires have passed through the land. When released from their capsules, the seeds are eventually dispersed by means of the wind.

== Conservation ==
Protea convexa was already assessed as 'rare' in 1980, a conservation status which was given again in 1996 by the South African National Biodiversity Institute (SANBI) in the first Red List of South African Plants. It was considered rare and known from only a few populations in the 1990s. In their 2006 assessment for the Red List, SANBI considered the conservation status to be 'critically endangered', this was repeated again in the 2009 assessment.

The plant is mostly thought to be threatened by the expansion of rooibos tea farms in its habitat, as well as the effects of climate change. It is susceptible to drought, plants can die in such circumstances. Other potential threats identified were invasive plants, natural disasters and pollution.

In 2005 Bomhard et al. predicted, based on their reading of models projecting the effects of climate change, that more than 80% of the population of the time would be extirpated by 2020, which qualified the species for upgrading its conservation status from 'lower risk' to 'critically endangered'. In the 2006 assessment, SANBI, "based on the opinion of experts", moved up the date when the species would be reduced by more than 80% to 2025. The total population numbers were thought to be decreasing in 2006.
