= Neohesperidin =

Names
- IUPAC name (2S)-3′,5-Dihydroxy-4′-methoxy-7-[α-L-rhamnopyranosyl-(1→2)-β-D-glucopyranosyloxy]flavan-4-one
- Systematic IUPAC name (2S)-7-{[(2S,3R,4S,5S,6R)-4,5-Dihydroxy-6-(hydroxymethyl)-3-{[(2S,3R,4R,5R,6S)-3,4,5-trihydroxy-6-methyloxan-2-yl]oxy}oxan-2-yl]oxy}-5-hydroxy-2-(3-hydroxy-4-methoxyphenyl)-2,3-dihydro-4H-1-benzopyran-4-one
- Other names Hesperetin 7-O-neohesperidoside

Identifiers
CAS Number	13241-33-3
3D model (JSmol)	Interactive image
ChEBI	CHEBI:59016
ChemSpider	390879
ECHA InfoCard	100.032.910
KEGG	C09806
PubChem CID	442439
UNII	OA5C88H3L0
CompTox Dashboard (EPA)	DTXSID60927668
- InChI: InChI=1S/C28H34O15/c1-10-21(33)23(35)25(37)27(39-10)43-26-24(36)22(34)19(9-29)42-28(26)40-12-6-14(31)20-15(32)8-17(41-18(20)7-12)11-3-4-16(38-2)13(30)5-11/h3-7,10,17,19,21-31,33-37H,8-9H2,1-2H3/t10-,17-,19+,21-,22+,23+,24-,25+,26+,27-,28+/m0/s1 Key: ARGKVCXINMKCAZ-UZRWAPQLSA-N; InChI=1/C28H34O15/c1-10-21(33)23(35)25(37)27(39-10)43-26-24(36)22(34)19(9-29)42-28(26)40-12-6-14(31)20-15(32)8-17(41-18(20)7-12)11-3-4-16(38-2)13(30)5-11/h3-7,10,17,19,21-31,33-37H,8-9H2,1-2H3/t10-,17-,19+,21-,22+,23+,24-,25+,26+,27-,28+/m0/s1 Key: ARGKVCXINMKCAZ-UZRWAPQLBV
- SMILES: C[C@H]1[C@@H]([C@H]([C@H]([C@@H](O1)O[C@@H]2[C@H]([C@@H]([C@H](O[C@H]2OC3=CC(=C4C(=O)C[C@H](OC4=C3)C5=CC(=C(C=C5)OC)O)O)CO)O)O)O)O)O

Properties
Chemical formula	C_{28}H_{34}O_{15}
Molar mass	610.565 g·mol^{−1}
- Except where otherwise noted, data are given for materials in their standard state (at 25 °C [77 °F], 100 kPa). Infobox references

Neohesperidin is a flavanone glycoside found in citrus fruits. It is the 7-O-neohesperidose derivative of hesperetin, which in turn is the 4'-methoxy derivative of eriodictyol. Neohesperidin dihydrochalcone has an intense sweet taste, and is listed as a generally recognized as safe flavour enhancer by the Flavor and Extract Manufacturers Association.

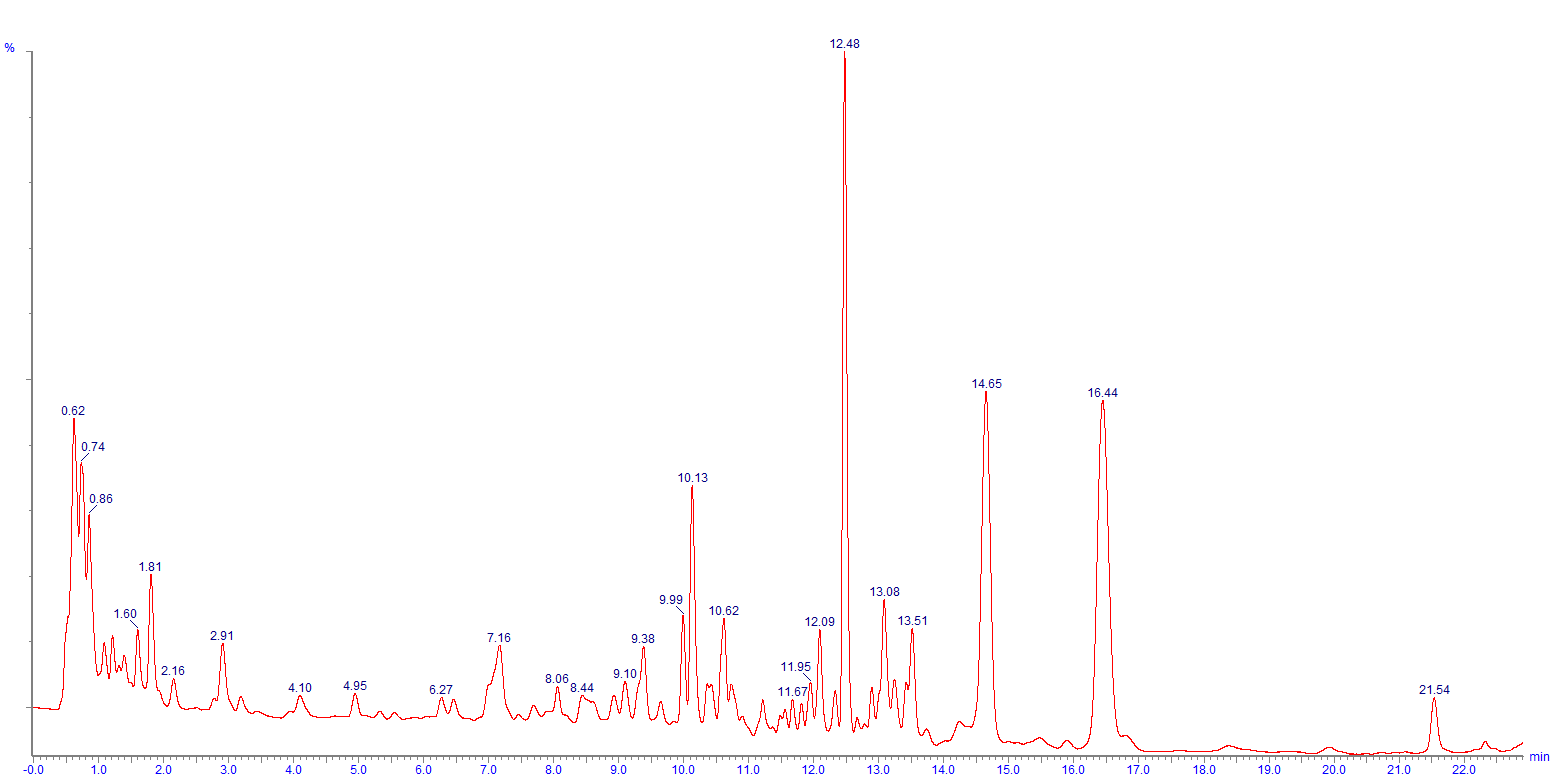
UV 280 nm chromatogram after UHPLC separation of commercial orange juice
