= Aspalathin =

Names
- IUPAC name 3-(3,4-Dihydroxyphenyl)-1-[5-(β-D-glucopyranosyl)-2,4-dihydroxyphenyl]propan-1-one
- Systematic IUPAC name 3-(3,4-Dihydroxyphenyl)-1-{2,4-dihydroxy-5-[(2S,3R,4R,5S,6R)-3,4,5-trihydroxy-6-(hydroxymethyl)oxan-2-yl]phenyl}propan-1-one

Identifiers
CAS Number	6027-43-6
3D model (JSmol)	Interactive image
ChEBI	CHEBI:79078
ChemSpider	9457391
ECHA InfoCard	100.233.299
PubChem CID	11282394
CompTox Dashboard (EPA)	DTXSID90726949
- InChI: InChI=1S/C21H24O11/c22-7-14-17(28)19(30)20(31)21(32-14)16-13(27)6-12(26)15(18(16)29)10(24)4-2-8-1-3-9(23)11(25)5-8/h1,3,5-6,14,17,19-23,25-31H,2,4,7H2/t14-,17-,19+,20-,21+/m1/s1 Key: VCPUQYKWJRESOC-VJXVFPJBSA-N; InChI=1/C21H24O11/c22-7-14-17(28)19(30)20(31)21(32-14)16-13(27)6-12(26)15(18(16)29)10(24)4-2-8-1-3-9(23)11(25)5-8/h1,3,5-6,14,17,19-23,25-31H,2,4,7H2/t14-,17-,19+,20-,21+/m1/s1 Key: VCPUQYKWJRESOC-VJXVFPJBBW
- SMILES: O=C(c1c(O)c(c(O)cc1O)[C@@H]2O[C@@H]([C@@H](O)[C@H](O)[C@H]2O)CO)CCc3ccc(O)c(O)c3

Properties
Chemical formula	C_{21}H_{24}O_{11}
Molar mass	452.412 g·mol^{−1}
- Except where otherwise noted, data are given for materials in their standard state (at 25 °C [77 °F], 100 kPa). verify (what is ?) Infobox references

Aspalathin is a C-linked dihydrochalcone glucoside found in rooibos tea, a herbal tea prepared from the South African rooibos plant, Aspalathus linearis (Fabaceae).

It was first isolated in 1965 by chromatography.

It has demonstrated antidiabetic activity.
