= Naringin dihydrochalcone =

Names
- IUPAC name 1-[4-[(3S,4R,5R,6S)-4,5-dihydroxy-6-(hydroxymethyl)-3-[(2S,3R,4R,5R,6S)-3,4,5-trihydroxy-6-methyloxan-2-yl]oxyoxan-2-yl]oxy-2, 6-dihydroxyphenyl]-3-(4-hydroxyphenyl)propan-1-one
- Systematic IUPAC name 3,5-Dihydroxy-4-[3-(4-hydroxyphenyl)propanoyl]phenyl 2-O-(6-deoxy-α-L-mannopyranosyl)-β-L-glucopyranoside
- Other names Naringin DC

Identifiers
CAS Number	18916-17-1
3D model (JSmol)	Interactive image
ChemSpider	23089598
ECHA InfoCard	100.127.977
PubChem CID	25245680
UNII	7233QDO0QW
CompTox Dashboard (EPA)	DTXSID10940428
- InChI: InChI=1S/C27H34O14/c1-11-20(33)22(35)24(37)26(38-11)41-25-23(36)21(34)18(10-28)40-27(25)39-14-8-16(31)19(17(32)9-14)15(30)7-4-12-2-5-13(29)6-3-12/h2-3,5-6,8-9,11,18,20-29,31-37H,4,7,10H2,1H3/t11-,18-,20-,21-,22+,23+,24+,25-,26-,27-/m0/s1 Key: CWBZAESOUBENAP-IKACCGSXSA-N; InChI=1/C27H34O14/c1-11-20(33)22(35)24(37)26(38-11)41-25-23(36)21(34)18(10-28)40-27(25)39-14-8-16(31)19(17(32)9-14)15(30)7-4-12-2-5-13(29)6-3-12/h2-3,5-6,8-9,11,18,20-29,31-37H,4,7,10H2,1H3/t11-,18-,20-,21-,22+,23+,24+,25-,26-,27-/m0/s1 Key: CWBZAESOUBENAP-IKACCGSXBG
- SMILES: C[C@H]1[C@@H]([C@H]([C@H]([C@@H](O1)O[C@H]2[C@@H]([C@H]([C@@H](O[C@@H]2Oc3cc(c(c(c3)O)C(=O)CCc4ccc(cc4)O)O)CO)O)O)O)O)O

Properties
Chemical formula	C_{27}H_{34}O_{14}
Molar mass	582.555 g·mol^{−1}
Appearance	White powder
Melting point	169 to 170 °C (336 to 338 °F; 442 to 443 K)
- Except where otherwise noted, data are given for materials in their standard state (at 25 °C [77 °F], 100 kPa). verify (what is ?) Infobox references

Naringin dihydrochalcone, sometimes abbreviated to naringin DC, is an artificial sweetener derived from naringin, a bitter compound found in citrus.

Naringin dihydrochalcone is a phloretin glycoside discovered at the same time as neohesperidin dihydrochalcone during the 1960s as part of a United States Department of Agriculture research program to find methods for minimizing the taste of bitter flavorants in citrus juices.

When naringin is treated with potassium hydroxide or another strong base, and then catalytically hydrogenated, it becomes a dihydrochalcone that is roughly 300–1800 times sweeter than sugar at threshold concentrations.
