= Alnetin =

Names
- IUPAC name 5-Hydroxy-6,7,8-trimethoxyflavone
- Systematic IUPAC name 5-Hydroxy-6,7,8-trimethoxy-2-phenyl-4H-1-benzopyran-4-one
- Other names 5-Hydroxy-6,7,8-trimethoxy-2-phenyl-4H-chromen-4-one

Identifiers
CAS Number	3151-82-4
3D model (JSmol)	Interactive image
ChemSpider	65966
PubChem CID	73210
UNII	2L2Y6EHL5E
CompTox Dashboard (EPA)	DTXSID20185409
- InChI: InChI=1S/C18H16O6/c1-21-16-14(20)13-11(19)9-12(10-7-5-4-6-8-10)24-15(13)17(22-2)18(16)23-3/h4-9,20H,1-3H3 Key: VOLPCZWHFBZDQT-UHFFFAOYSA-N; InChI=1/C18H16O6/c1-21-16-14(20)13-11(19)9-12(10-7-5-4-6-8-10)24-15(13)17(22-2)18(16)23-3/h4-9,20H,1-3H3 Key: VOLPCZWHFBZDQT-UHFFFAOYAZ
- SMILES: O=C\1c3c(O/C(=C/1)c2ccccc2)c(OC)c(OC)c(OC)c3O

Properties
Chemical formula	C_{18}H_{16}O_{6}
Molar mass	328.316
- Except where otherwise noted, data are given for materials in their standard state (at 25 °C [77 °F], 100 kPa). Infobox references

Alnetin is a flavone isolated from Lindera lucida.
