= Dihydrokanakugiol =

Names
- Preferred IUPAC name 1-(2-Hydroxy-3,4,5,6-tetramethoxyphenyl)-3-phenylpropan-1-one
- Other names 2′-Hydroxy-3′,4′,5′,6′-tetramethoxydihydrochalcone

Identifiers
CAS Number	117842-21-4
3D model (JSmol)	Interactive image
ChemSpider	164658
PubChem CID	189521
UNII	UF83QKJ2CR
CompTox Dashboard (EPA)	DTXSID50151930
- InChI: InChI=1S/C19H22O6/c1-22-16-14(13(20)11-10-12-8-6-5-7-9-12)15(21)17(23-2)19(25-4)18(16)24-3/h5-9,21H,10-11H2,1-4H3 Key: NTAJFHWMQLZQMI-UHFFFAOYSA-N; InChI=1/C19H22O6/c1-22-16-14(13(20)11-10-12-8-6-5-7-9-12)15(21)17(23-2)19(25-4)18(16)24-3/h5-9,21H,10-11H2,1-4H3 Key: NTAJFHWMQLZQMI-UHFFFAOYAK
- SMILES: COC1=C(C(=C(C(=C1C(=O)CCC2=CC=CC=C2)O)OC)OC)OC

Properties
Chemical formula	C_{19}H_{22}O_{6}
Molar mass	346.379 g·mol^{−1}
- Except where otherwise noted, data are given for materials in their standard state (at 25 °C [77 °F], 100 kPa). Infobox references

Dihydrokanakugiol is a dihydrochalcone isolated from Lindera lucida.
