= Indriline =

Stimulant and antidepressant drug

Clinical data
- Other names: Lu 3-083, MJ 1986.

Identifiers
- CAS Number: 7395-90-6
- PubChem CID: 23878
- ChemSpider: 22324
- UNII: J2LLI1K6QQ
- ChEMBL: ChEMBL2110854
- CompTox Dashboard (EPA): DTXSID90864052

Chemical and physical data
- Formula: C_{19}H_{21}N
- Molar mass: 263.384 g·mol^{−1}
- 3D model (JSmol): Interactive image
- SMILES: CN(C)CCC1(C=CC2=CC=CC=C21)C3=CC=CC=C3
- InChI: InChI=1S/C19H21N/c1-20(2)15-14-19(17-9-4-3-5-10-17)13-12-16-8-6-7-11-18(16)19/h3-13H,14-15H2,1-2H3; Key:KAQPNQMPHIRKJJ-UHFFFAOYSA-N

Indriline is a central nervous system stimulant with antidepressant activity and application in the treatment of gastric ulcers.

A patent using this chemical is assigned to: Pharmacology.

== Synthesis ==
The chemical synthesis of indriline has been described:

Indriline synthesis

Treatment of 3-phenylindene [1961-97-3] (1) with n-butyl lithium and dimethylamino-2-choroethane gave indriline as well as some inactive isomer. Based on neighboring group participation (NGP), the reaction intermediate is presumably an aziridinium ion

According to Molbase the number of routes for preparing the starting 3-phenylindene is rich. For example from dihydrochalcone. A more classical synthesis is also described in a Pyrophendane patent.
