= LCTL =

Protein-coding gene in the species Homo sapiens

Identifiers
- Aliases: LCTL, KLG, KLPH, lactase like
- External IDs: OMIM: 617060; MGI: 2183549; GeneCards: LCTL

Gene location (Human)
Chr.	Chromosome 15 (human)
Band	15q22.31	Start	66,547,179 bp
Band	15q22.31	End	66,565,998 bp

Gene location (Mouse)
Chr.	Chromosome 9 (mouse)
Band	9|9 C	Start	64,024,429 bp
Band	9|9 C	End	64,045,400 bp
RNA expression pattern
Bgee	Human / Mouse (ortholog); Top expressed in: sural nerve; testicle; C1 segment; gonad; stromal cell of endometrium; caudate nucleus; nucleus accumbens; amygdala; ventricular zone; putamen / Top expressed in: lens; white adipose tissue; morula; blastocyst; right kidney; human kidney; primary oocyte; ovary; secondary oocyte; skeletal muscle tissue; More reference expression data
BioGPS	n/a
Gene ontology
Molecular function	hydrolase activity, hydrolyzing O-glycosyl compounds; beta-glucosidase activity
Cellular component	integral component of membrane; endoplasmic reticulum membrane; brush border; membrane; endoplasmic reticulum
Biological process	glycosyl compound metabolic process; carbohydrate metabolic process; lens morphogenesis in camera-type eye; visual perception; response to stimulus
Sources:Amigo / QuickGO
Orthologs
Databases	NCBI: entry; OMA: entry
Species	Human	Mouse
Entrez	197021	235435
Ensembl	ENSG00000188501	ENSMUSG00000032401
UniProt	Q6UWM7	Q8K1F9
RefSeq (mRNA)	NM_001278562; NM_207338; NM_001394632; NM_001394633	NM_145835
RefSeq (protein)	NP_001265491; NP_997221	NP_665834
Location (UCSC)	Chr 15: 66.55 – 66.57 Mb	Chr 9: 64.02 – 64.05 Mb
PubMed search
- Wikidata
View/Edit Human	View/Edit Mouse

Lactase-like is a protein that in humans is encoded by the LCTL gene. Lactase-like is a glycosidase enzyme.

== Function ==
This gene encodes a member of family 1 glycosidases. Glycosidases are enzymes that hydrolyze glycosidic bonds and are classified into families based on primary amino acid sequence. Most members of family 1 have two conserved glutamic acid residues, which are required for enzymatic activity. The mouse ortholog of this protein has been characterized and has a domain structure of an N-terminal signal peptide, glycosidase domain, transmembrane domain, and a short cytoplasmic tail. It lacks one of the conserved glutamic acid residues important for catalysis, and its function remains to be determined (PMID: 12084582). Alternative splicing results in multiple transcript variants. [provided by RefSeq, Jun 2013]
