= Cynaropicrin =

Identifiers
- IUPAC name: [(3aR,4S,6aR,8S,9aR,9bR)-8-hydroxy-3,6,9-trimethylidene-2-oxo-3a,4,5,6a,7,8,9a,9b-octahydroazuleno[4,5-b]furan-4-yl] 2-(hydroxymethyl)prop-2-enoate
- CAS Number: 35730-78-0
- PubChem CID: 119093
- ChemSpider: 106409
- UNII: M9233789I9
- KEGG: C09385
- ChEBI: CHEBI:4038
- ChEMBL: ChEMBL374146
- CompTox Dashboard (EPA): DTXSID20957143
- ECHA InfoCard: 100.216.734

Chemical and physical data
- Formula: C_{19}H_{22}O_{6}
- Molar mass: 346.379 g·mol^{−1}
- 3D model (JSmol): Interactive image
- SMILES: C=C1C[C@@H]([C@@H]2[C@@H]([C@@H]3[C@H]1C[C@@H](C3=C)O)OC(=O)C2=C)OC(=O)C(=C)CO
- InChI: InChI=InChI=1S/C19H22O6/c1-8-5-14(24-18(22)9(2)7-20)16-11(4)19(23)25-17(16)15-10(3)13(21)6-12(8)15/h12-17,20-21H,1-7H2/t12-,13-,14-,15-,16+,17+/m0/s1; Key:KHSCYOFDKADJDJ-NQLMQOPMSA-N

Cynaropicrin is a sesquiterpene lactone of the guaianolide type found mainly in leaves of artichoke plants. It is one of the compounds that gives the artichoke its characteristic bitterness. It is found in artichoke leaves with an abundance of approximately 87 g/kg, but can hardly be found in other parts of the plant. Cynaropicrin makes up about 0.7% of leaf extracts of the artichoke. It exhibits a large diversity of bioactivities and shows properties such as anti-inflammatory, antifeedant and activation of bitter sensory receptors, but has not yet been used in medicine. Despite its pharmacologically beneficial properties, it can be toxic in higher doses. The compound has attracted attention in recent years as a potential anticancer drug.

== History ==
The knowledge of the health benefits of the artichoke dates back to the 4th century B.C., but its use was not rediscovered until the 16th century. Research into the composition of the artichoke started in the first half of the 20th century. In the early 1950s, cynarin was isolated from the leaves and some years later cynaropicrin was discovered. Cynaropicrin was first isolated from the leaves of the Cynara scolymus L. (artichoke) in 1959 by a group of researchers of the Czechoslovak Academy of Sciences in Prague. It was found to be the main compound causing the bitter flavour of the artichoke. The researchers encountered difficulties in acquiring cynaropicrin in a crystalline form, which they later found to be caused by its ability to readily polymerize.

== Structure and reactivity ==
Cynaropicrin has a 5-7-5 fused tricyclic skeleton and contains two hydroxyl groups on each side of the molecule, allowing it to form a homopolymer. Its γ-butyrolactone ring is involved in most of its biological functions. The unsaturated carbonyl group on the lactone ring allows for nucleophilic Michael addition. Cynaropicrin is soluble in water and has no violations of the rule of five.

== Synthesis ==
Cynaropicrin is synthesized in the leaves of the artichoke plant and was found to accumulate in the trichomes. While the full mechanism of biosynthesis of cynaropicrin is unknown, it is proposed that biosynthesis starts with three isoprene C5-units, which are processed by the mevalonate pathway to form farnesyl pyrophosphate (FPP). With germacrene A and germacrene A acid as intermediates, FPP is converted into costunolide using two syntheses and a cytochrome P450 oxidase. Multiple yet unknown reactions occur to first form guaianolide and later cynaropicrin.

== Mechanism of action ==
Cynaropicrin is shown to have various effects, and thus various mechanisms of action.

=== Anti-hepatitis C virus ===
Cynaropicrin inhibits the entry of pan-genomic hepatitis C virus into cells and inhibits cell-cell transmission.

=== Anti-hyperlipidemic ===
Cynaropicrin also shows anti-hyperlipidemic activity. The oxygen functional groups and the methylene of the GBL ring were found the help in anti-hyperlipidemic activity. Inhibition of gastric emptying also plays a minor role in this property.

=== Anti-tumor and cytotoxic activity ===
Cynaropicrin inhibits the activation of major adhesion molecules CD29 and CD98 involved in inflammation, but not CD43. This indicates that it might be a specific immunopharmacological effect. These adhesion molecules are essential factors in regulating the inflammatory process. It is linked to the inhibition of extracellular signal-related kinase (ERK).

Research shows that it had a pro-apoptotic activity on cancer cell lines U937, Eol-1 and Jurkat T cells. Its cytotoxic activity was inhibited by N-acetyl-L-cysteine and L-cysteine, reactive oxygen species and rottlerin (protein kinase Cδ inhibitor), indicating that PKCδ and ROS are important for its pro-apoptotic activity of cynaropicrin by proteolytic cleavage of PKCδ.

Transcription factor signal inducer and activator of transcription 3 (STAT3) is continuously activated in cancer cells. It plays a critical role in the inhibition of apoptosis and induces chemoresistance. The α-β-unsaturated carbonyl moiety in cynaropicrin leads to a drop of intracellular GSH concentration via the Michael reaction. This inhibits the phosphorylation of STAT3 and increases the S-glutathionylation of STAT3 and therefore deactivating it. This leads to an increase in the expression of apoptotic genes.

=== Anti-inflammatory ===
Cynaropicrin is an inhibitor of TNF-α, a cytokine used in inflammation of tissue. It inhibits the production of TNF-α from lipopolysaccharide-stimulated murine macrophage RAW264.7 cells. It also inhibits the release of nitric oxide from lipopolysaccharide- and interferon-γ-stimulated RAW264.7 cells. Lastly. it also suppressed lymphocyte proliferation from splenocytes. All these compounds, TNF-α, nitric oxide and lymphocytes, are all essential for inflammation.

=== Anti-photoaging and antioxidant ===
Cynaropicrin is a potent activator of the ArH-Nrf2-Nqo1 pathway in human keratinocytes. It also inhibits the generation of ROS, and pro-inflammatory cytokines TNF-α and IL-6 in keratinocytes irradiated with UVB. These processes are important in photoaging which is a causative agent for skin cancer.

=== Antibacterial ===
Cynaropicrin binds to the thiol group of the Cys115 in the bacterial enzyme MurA through Michael addition reaction. The unsaturated ester side chain of cynaropicrin appears to mimic the substrate phosphoenolpyruvate (PEP). The irreversible inhibition of this enzyme stops the cytoplasmic biosynthesis of peptidoglycan precursor molecules.

=== Anti-parasitic ===
Cynaropicrin shows a reduction in parasitemia in murine models and has potent antitrypanosomal activity. It lowers intracellular GSH and trypanothione levels and inhibits trypanosomal ornithine decarboxylase with its α,β-unsaturated methylene moiety which acts as Michael acceptor. This leads to apoptosis of parasites. The 2-hydroxymethyl-2-propenoyl moiety was found to play an important role in the toxicity. Removal of this group led to a loss of toxicity towards T. brucei rhodesiense and a tenfold loss of activity against T brucei.

== Metabolism ==
The metabolism of cynaropicrin and the biotransformation in humans is not known.

== Indications ==
=== Anti-hepatitis C virus ===
Cynaropicrin has been shown to be an inhibitor against HCV in the early stages of its lifecycle. Eight of the eighteen genotypes of the HCV virus (1a, 1b, 2b, 3a, 4a, 5a, 6a, and 7a) were inhibited using only small doses, revealing its potential against the disease.

=== Anti-hyperlipidemic ===
It was shown that leaf-extract of artichoke, with cynaropicrin as one of its functional compounds, put a restraint on the elevation of serum triglyceride elevation. This raises the possibility of the use against obesity related diseases and up to now incurable diseases.

=== Anti-tumor and cytotoxic activity ===
Cynaropicrin has a cytotoxic effect in various human cancer cell lines. It has been shown to inhibit cell proliferation in certain cancer cell lines (AGS and Hepa 1c1c7 cells), which is possible by, among other things, suppression of anti-apoptotic genes. It also induces apoptosis in leukocyte cancer cells and affects the invasion, migration and metastasis of those cells. This is an example of diseases mediated by DC29 and DC98, of which the compound holds potential as a drug for treatment.

=== Anti-inflammatory ===
Cynaropicrin has anti-inflammatory abilities through the proliferation of lymphocytes and the inhibition of the production of mediators. An example of which is the inhibition of cytokine-induced and TNF-α neutrophil chemoattractant-1 and nitric oxide release.

=== Anti-photoaging and antioxidant ===
Cynaropicrin can be used as an anti-photoaging agent, as it prevents UVB-induced photoaging. Additionally, an experiment with artichoke leaf extract resulted in a decrease in wrinkles and noticeable pores, as well as an increase in facial pigmentation. This is due to the lessened decline of dermal proteoglycan, a compound important for holding water.

=== Antibacterial ===
In bacterial cells the enzyme MurA is of vital importance, as it is responsible for the cytoplasmic biosynthesis of peptidoglycan precursor molecules. Cynaropicrin inhibits this enzyme, and thus it has potent antibacterial activity.

=== Anti-parasitic ===
It has been shown that cynaropicrin has anti-parasitic activities for various organisms (trypanosoma) both in vitro and in vivo. The compound is the first natural product that has in vivo potential against the T. brucei.

=== Antifeedant ===
Cynaropicrin is a compound with promising potential as an antifeedant, as it has been shown to have deterring activity against multiple species of Lepidoptera (Arctiidae and Saturniidae). It also works relatively well against Trogoderma granarium larvae, Tribolium confusum larvae and Sitophilus granarius beetles. The compound works the best in combination with other sesquiterpene lactones and not in its pure form.

== Efficacy ==
=== Anti-hepatitis C virus ===
The effect of cynaropicrin on all affected genotypes has been shown to be generally strong, with EC_{50} values in low micromolar ranges: 0.4 - 1.4 μM, with an average of 0.8 μM.

=== Anti-tumor and cytotoxic ===
Cynaropicrin has shown variable efficacy on different cancer cell lines. The IC_{50} lies between 0.068 and 8.7 μg/ml, with outliers of 30.22 and 116.96 μg/ml for the growth inhibition of AGS and Hepa1c1c7 cells respectively.

The cytotoxic effect on some of the human tumor cell lines has been given contradictory ED_{50} values. SK-OV-3, SK-MEL-2, A549, HCT-15 and XF498 (CNS) cell lines have been tested and resulted in a range between 0.29 and 1.37 μg/ml. Another study has given values between 1.41 and 8.48 μg/ml for the SK-MEL-2, SK-OV-3, A549 and HCT cell lines. Additionally, the same study has given a range of ED_{50} values for the compound doxorubicin, which is 0.0038-0.089 μm/ml. This leaves cynaropicrin as the less effective compound.

=== Anti-photoaging and antioxidant ===
In keratinocytes, cynaropicrin has an EC_{50} of 0.89 μM and an CC_{50} of 47.6 μM on Nqo1 induction. This makes it a potent antioxidant there and thus a potent anti-photoaging compound.

=== Anti-parasitic ===
For the antiparasitic activity of cynaropicrin various species were tested, especially the trypanosoma. The IC_{50} values vary, but lie between 0.2 and 4.4 μM. In a mouse model the compound caused a reduction of parasitemia of 92% in comparison to the control.

== Toxicity ==
The toxicity of cynaropicrin was investigated in vitro and in vivo. In mice, doses of 25 mg/kg/day increased the mortality and induced toxic effects like ataxia and tremors. At higher doses (≥200 mg/kg), the liver was also affected. There was an increase in the ALT levels, with effects of mononuclear cell infiltration, necrosis and hepatocyte regeneration. Additionally, the spleen undergoes a modest amount of white pulp activation and has an increased number of megakaryocytes. At a dose of 400 mg/kg, mice died due to its toxicity.

It has been shown that cynaropicrin has a dose-related effect on cell cultures of neuronal and glial cells of foetal rat brain. The functionality of the compound is unknown, but results in cell death in more than eighty percent of the cells of the culture.

On preparations of isolated aortic rings of rabbit it was shown that cynaropicrin inhibits the contraction of smooth muscles.

In humans, there has been no proven toxicological effects in normal intake. However, when taken in pure form in large quantities, it is acutely toxic. People who come into contact with the compound due to their profession sometimes develop the allergic reaction contact dermatitis or local eczema.
