= 6-phospho-β-galactosidase =

InterPro Family

6-Phospho-β-galactosidase

Identifiers
- EC no.: 3.2.1.85
- CAS no.: 37237-42-6

Databases
- IntEnz: IntEnz view
- BRENDA: BRENDA entry
- ExPASy: NiceZyme view
- KEGG: KEGG entry
- MetaCyc: metabolic pathway
- PRIAM: profile
- PDB structures: RCSB PDB PDBe PDBsum
Search
- PMC: articles
- PubMed: articles
- NCBI: proteins

The enzyme 6-phospho-β-galactosidase (EC 3.2.1.85) catalyzes the following reaction:

a 6-phospho-β-D-galactoside + H_{2}O $\rightleftharpoons$ 6-phospho-D-galactose + an alcohol

This enzyme belongs to the family of hydrolases, specifically those glycosidases that hydrolyse O- and S-glycosyl compounds. The systematic name is 6-phospho-β-D-galactoside 6-phosphogalactohydrolase. Other names in common use include phospho-β-galactosidase, β-D-phosphogalactoside galactohydrolase, phospho-β-D-galactosidase, and 6-phospho-β-D-galactosidase. This enzyme participates in galactose metabolism.

== Structural studies ==
As of 2007, four structures have been solved for this class of enzymes, with PDB accession codes 1PBG, 2PBG, 3PBG, and 4PBG.
