= 6-Phospho-β-glucosidase =

Class of enzymes

Identifiers
- EC no.: 3.2.1.86
- CAS no.: 37205-51-9

Databases
- IntEnz: IntEnz view
- BRENDA: BRENDA entry
- ExPASy: NiceZyme view
- KEGG: KEGG entry
- MetaCyc: metabolic pathway
- PRIAM: profile
- PDB structures: RCSB PDB PDBe PDBsum
- Gene Ontology: AmiGO / QuickGO
Search
- PMC: articles
- PubMed: articles
- NCBI: proteins

The enzyme 6-phospho-β-glucosidase (EC 3.2.1.86) catalyzes the following reaction:

6-phospho-β-D-glucosyl-(1,4)-D-glucose + H_{2}O $\rightleftharpoons$ D-glucose + D-glucose 6-phosphate

This enzyme belongs to the family of hydrolases, specifically those glycosidases that hydrolyse O- and S-glycosyl compounds. The systematic name of this enzyme class is 6-phospho-β-D-glucosyl-(1,4)-D-glucose glucohydrolase. Other names in common use include phospho-β-glucosidase A, phospho-β-glucosidase, and phosphocellobiase.

== Structural studies ==
As of late 2007, only one structure has been solved for this class of enzymes, with the PDB accession code 1S6Y.
