= Glycosylceramidase =

Class of enzymes

Identifiers
- EC no.: 3.2.1.62
- CAS no.: 9033-10-7

Databases
- IntEnz: IntEnz view
- BRENDA: BRENDA entry
- ExPASy: NiceZyme view
- KEGG: KEGG entry
- MetaCyc: metabolic pathway
- PRIAM: profile
- PDB structures: RCSB PDB PDBe PDBsum
- Gene Ontology: AmiGO / QuickGO
Search
- PMC: articles
- PubMed: articles
- NCBI: proteins

The enzyme glycosylceramidase (EC 3.2.1.62) catalyzes the following chemical reaction:

glycosyl-N-acylsphingosine + H_{2}O $\rightleftharpoons$ N-acylsphingosine + a sugar

It belongs to the family of hydrolases, specifically those glycosidases that hydrolyse O- and S-glycosyl compounds. The systematic name of this enzyme class is glycosyl-N-acylsphingosine glycohydrolase. Other names in common use include phlorizin hydrolase, phloretin-glucosidase, glycosyl ceramide glycosylhydrolase, cerebrosidase, phloridzin β-glucosidase, lactase-phlorizin hydrolase, and phloridzin glucosidase.
