= Dihydrochalcone =

- Chemical structure of dihydrochalcone

Names
- Preferred IUPAC name 1,3-Diphenylpropan-1-one
- Other names Hydrochalcone; Benzylacetophenone; Hydrocinnamophenone; 3-Phenylpropiophenone; Phenethyl phenyl ketone Phenyl phenethyl ketone β-Phenylpropiophenone; 1,3-Diphenyl-1-propanone ω-Benzyl acetophenone

Identifiers
CAS Number	1083-30-3 =
3D model (JSmol)	Interactive image
ChEMBL	ChEMBL490512
ChemSpider	58334
ECHA InfoCard	100.150.317
PubChem CID	64802
UNII	H5W525SX7Q
CompTox Dashboard (EPA)	DTXSID7061481
- InChI: InChI=1S/C15H14O/c16-15(14-9-5-2-6-10-14)12-11-13-7-3-1-4-8-13/h1-10H,11-12H2 Key: QGGZBXOADPVUPN-UHFFFAOYSA-N
- SMILES: C1=CC=C(C=C1)CCC(=O)C2=CC=CC=C2

Properties
Chemical formula	C_{15}H_{14}O
Molar mass	210.27 g/mol
Appearance	white solid
Density	1.0614 g/cm3
Melting point	72–75 °C (162–167 °F; 345–348 K)
- Except where otherwise noted, data are given for materials in their standard state (at 25 °C [77 °F], 100 kPa). verify (what is ?) Infobox references

Dihydrochalcone (DHC) is the organic compound with the formula C_{6}H_{5}C(O)(CH_{2})_{2}C_{6}H_{5}. It is the reduced derivative of chalcone (C_{6}H_{5}C(O)(CH)_{2}C_{6}H_{5}). It is a white solid that is soluble in many organic solvents. Dihydrochalcone per se is often minor significance, but some derivatives occur in nature and have attracted attention as drugs.

The formation of dihydrochalcones removes the conjugation between the two ring systems (via the ketone) when the double bond is abolished. This causes the visible color of the chalcones to disappear in their dihydrochalcone derivatives.

== Natural dihydrochalcones ==
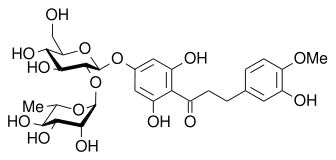
Neohesperidin dihydrochalcone is a commercial artificial sweetener that features the dihydrochalcone substituent.

- Aspalathin, a C-linked dihydrochalcone glucoside found in rooibos, a common herbal tea
- Naringin dihydrochalcone, an artificial sweetener derived from naringin
- Neohesperidin dihydrochalcone, an artificial sweetener derived from citrus
- Nothofagin, a C-linked phloretin glucoside found in rooibos
- Phloretin
- Isosalipurpurin

Dihydrochalcones (3′,5′-dihydroxy-2′,4′,6′-trimethoxydihydrochalcone (methyl linderone) and 2′-hydroxy-3′,4′,5′,6′-tetramethoxydihydrochalcone (dihydrokanakugiol) can be found in twigs of Lindera lucida.

== Uses ==
A known use of dihydrochalcone is in the synthesis of 3-phenylindene [1961-97-3]. This in-turn finds application in the synthesis of Indriline & Pyrophendane [7009-69-0].
