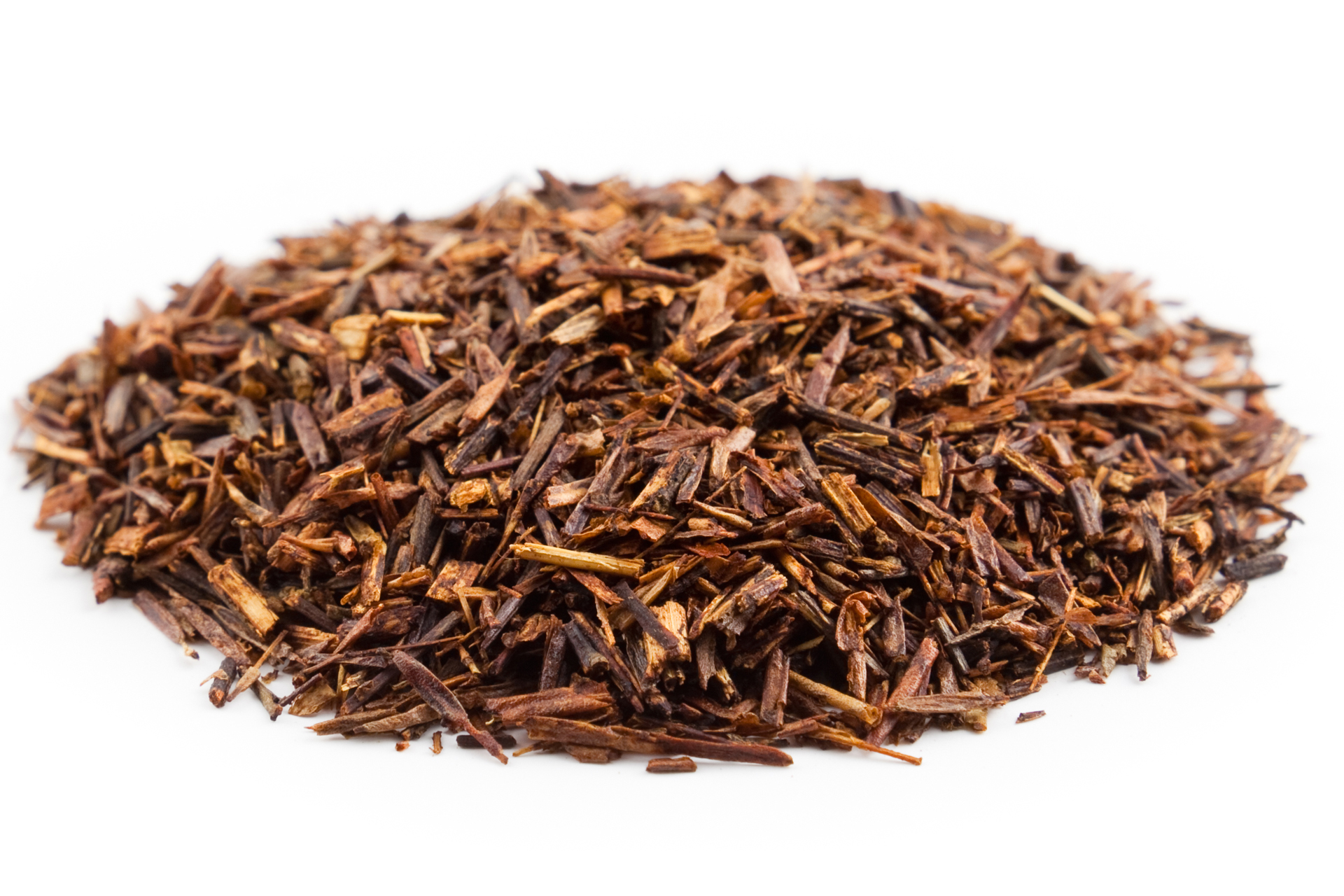
- Cut redbush

Conservation status
- Least Concern (SANBI Red List)

Scientific classification
- Kingdom: Plantae
- Clade: Tracheophytes
- Clade: Angiosperms
- Clade: Eudicots
- Clade: Rosids
- Order: Fabales
- Family: Fabaceae
- Subfamily: Faboideae
- Genus: Aspalathus
- Species: A. linearis

Binomial name
- Aspalathus linearis (Burm.f.) R.Dahlgren

Synonyms
- Lebeckia linearis (Burm.f.) DC.; Psoralea linearis Burm.f.; Achyronia tenuifolia (DC.) Kuntze; Aspalathus cognata C.Presl; Aspalathus corymbosa E.Mey.; Aspalathus tenuifolia DC.; Borbonia pinifolia Marloth; Genista contaminata Poir.; Lebeckia candolleana Walp.

= Rooibos =

Species of flowering plant

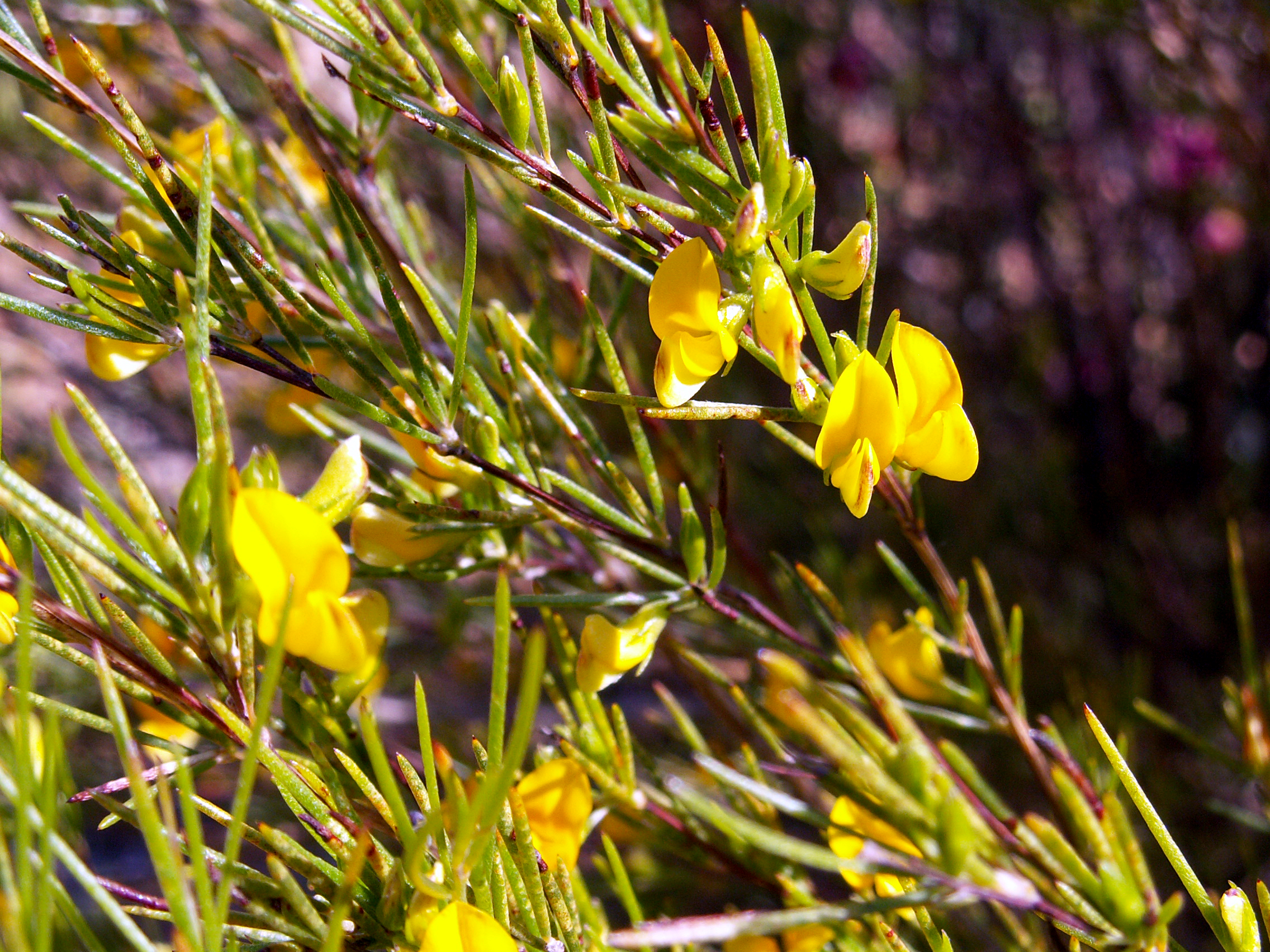
Flowers

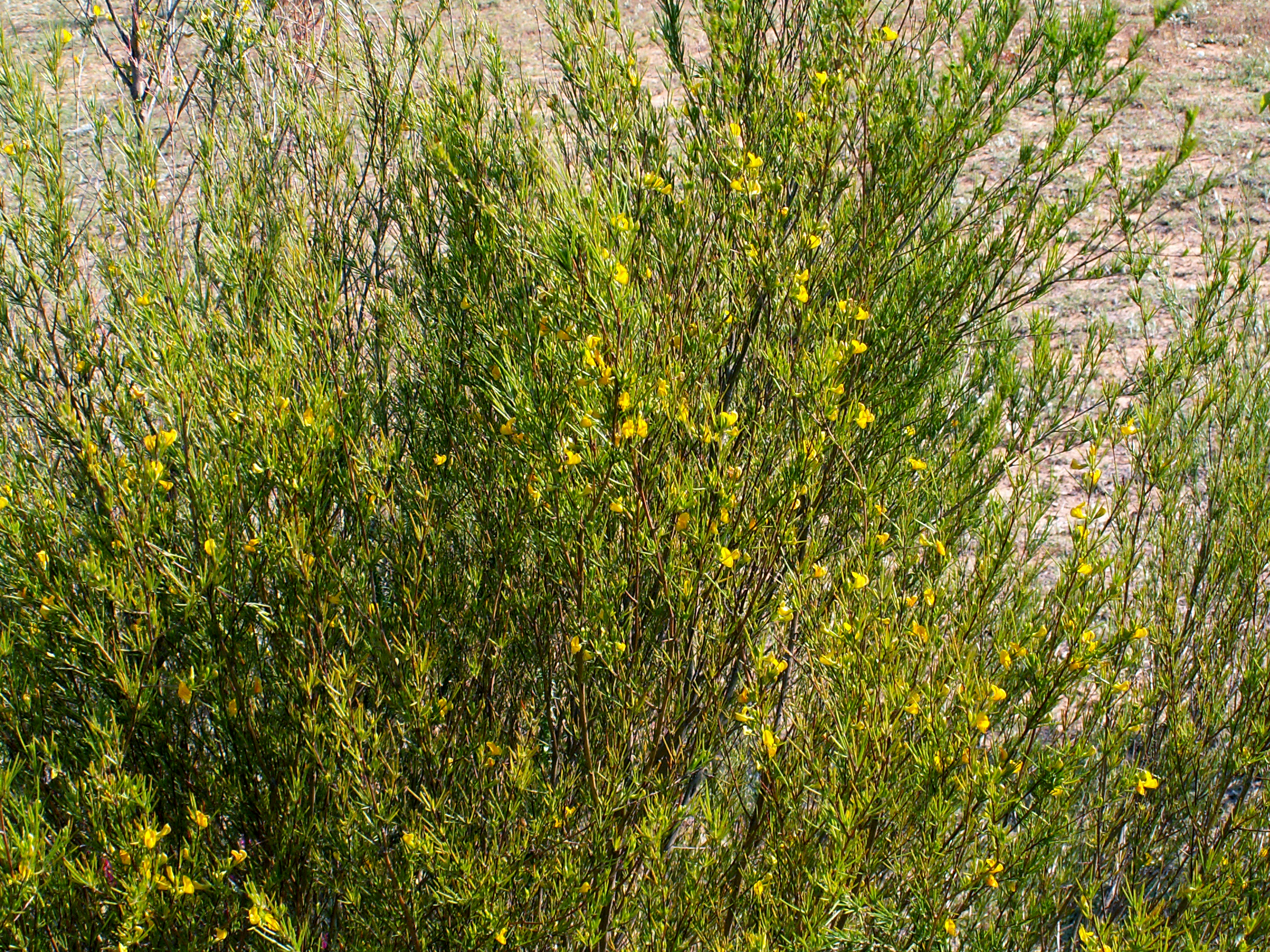
Plant

Rooibos (/ˈrɔɪbɒs/ ROY-boss; Afrikaans: [ˈroːibɔs], lit. 'red bush'), or Aspalathus linearis, is a broom-like member of the plant family Fabaceae that grows in South Africa's Fynbos biome. The leaves are used to make a caffeine-free herbal infusion that has been consumed in Southern Africa for generations. Internationally since the early 2000s, rooibos became more commonly consumed, possibly due to its earthy flavour and aroma similar to those of yerba mate or tobacco.

Outside of Southern Africa, it is called bush tea, red tea, or redbush tea (predominantly in Great Britain). The name rooibos is Afrikaans deriving from rooi bos, meaning 'red bush'. The name is protected in South Africa and has protected designation of origin status in the EU.

Rooibos was formerly classified in the genus Psoralea but is now thought to be part of Aspalathus, following Dahlgren (1980). The specific name of linearis, for the plant's linear growing structure and needle-like leaves, was given by Burman (1759).

== Production and processing ==
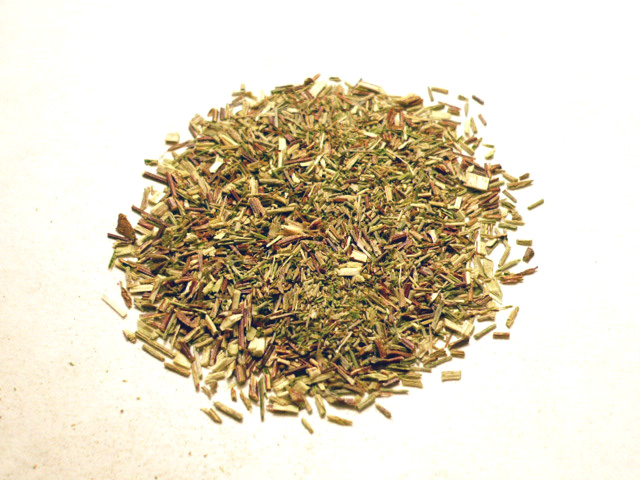
Green rooibos tea

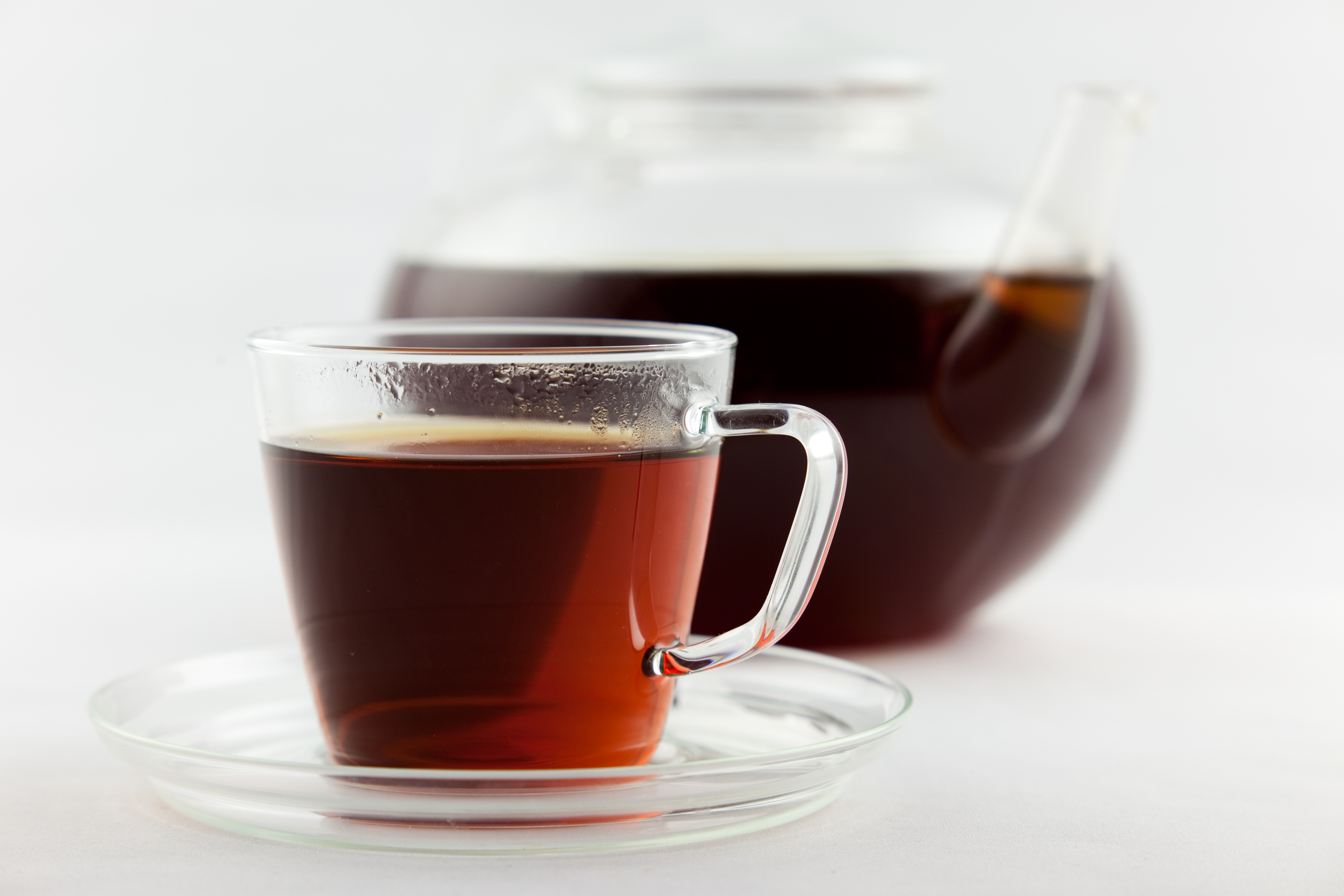
Rooibos tea in a glass

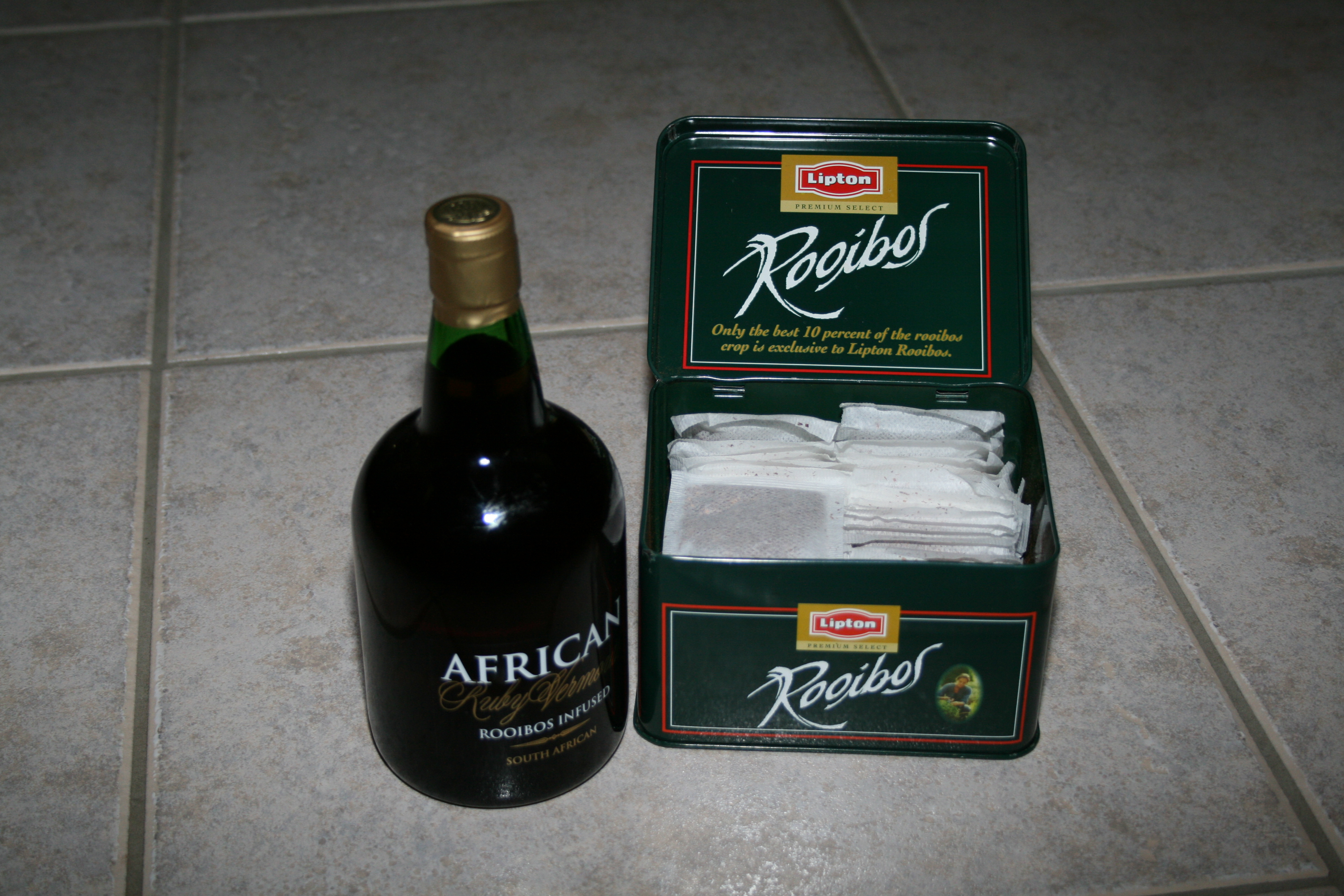
A rooibos-infused liqueur and rooibos tea

Rooibos is usually grown in the Cederberg, a small mountainous area in the West Coast District of the Western Cape province of South Africa.

Generally, the leaves undergo oxidation. This process produces the distinctive reddish-brown colour of rooibos and enhances the flavour. Unoxidised green rooibos is also produced, but the more demanding production process for green rooibos (similar to the method by which green tea is produced) makes it more expensive than traditional rooibos. It carries a malty and slightly grassy flavour somewhat different from its red counterpart.

=== Cultivation ===
Rooibos is farmed exclusively in a 60,000 ha (150,000 acres) area in the Cederberg region of South Africa, some 155 mi (249 km) north of Cape Town. The rooibos industry is a major employer during the summer months of harvesting. Workers cut the bushes, which are initially green, then lay them in the sun to dry, a process turning the rooibos leaves into a dark red color. After it has been processed and sterilized, rooibos is ready for local markets or export.

== Use ==
Rooibos is commonly prepared as a tisane by steeping in hot water, in the same manner as black tea. The infusion is consumed on its own or flavoured by addition of milk, lemon, sugar or honey. It is also served as lattes, cappuccinos or iced tea.

== Chemical composition ==
As a fresh leaf, rooibos contains a high content of ascorbic acid (vitamin C).

Rooibos tea does not contain caffeine and has low tannin levels compared to black tea or green tea. Rooibos contains polyphenols, including flavanols, flavones, flavanones, dihydrochalcones, and nothofagin.

The processed leaves and stems contain benzoic and cinnamic acids.

== Grading ==
Rooibos grades are largely related to the percentage needle or leaf to stem content in the mix. A higher leaf content results in a darker liquor, richer flavour and less "dusty" aftertaste. The high-grade rooibos is exported and does not reach local markets, with major consumers being the EU, particularly Germany, where it is used in creating flavoured blends for loose-leaf tea markets.

== History ==
Three species of the Borboniae group of Aspalathus, namely A. angustifolia, A. cordata and A. crenata, were once used as tea. These plants have simple, rigid, spine-tipped leaves, hence the common name 'stekeltee'. The earliest record of the use of Aspalathus as a source of tea was that of Carl Peter Thunberg, who wrote about the use of A. cordata as tea: "Of the leaves of Borbonia cordata the country people make tea." (Thunberg, July 1772, at Paarl). This anecdote is sometimes erroneously associated with rooibos tea (Aspalathus linearis).

Archaeological records suggest that Aspalathus linearis could have been used thousands of years ago, but that does not imply rooibos tea was made in precolonial times. The traditional method of harvesting and processing rooibos (for making rooibos infusion or decoction tea) could have, at least partly, originated in precolonial times. However, it does not necessarily follow that San and Khoikhoi used that method to prepare a beverage that they consumed for pleasure as tea.

The earliest available ethnobotanical records of rooibos tea originate in the late 19th century. Several authors have assumed that the tea originated from the local inhabitants of the Cederberg. Apparently, rooibos tea is a traditional drink of Khoi-descended people of the Cederberg (and "poor whites"). However, that tradition has not been traced further back than the last quarter of the 19th century. Traditionally, the local people would climb the mountains and cut the fine needle-like leaves from wild rooibos plants. They then rolled the bunches of leaves into hessian bags and brought them down the steep slopes using donkeys. Rooibos tea was traditionally processed by beating the material on a flat rock with a heavy wooden pole or club or a large wooden hammer.

In 1904, South African businessman, also referred to as 'the father of the rooibos industry', Benjamin Ginsberg ran a variety of experiments at Rondegat Farm and finally cured rooibos. He simulated the traditional Chinese method of making Keemun by fermenting the tea in barrels, drawing inspiration from his Jewish family's tradition of brewing tea and herbal infusions, which were customarily prepared with a samovar. The major hurdle in growing rooibos commercially was that farmers could not germinate the rooibos seeds. The seeds were hard to find and impossible to germinate commercially.

By the late 1920s, growing demand for the tea had led to problems with supply of the wild rooibos plants. As a remedy, Pieter le Fras Nortier, a district surgeon in Clanwilliam and an avid naturalist, proposed to develop a cultivated variety of rooibos to be raised on appropriately-situated land. He worked on cultivation of the rooibos species in partnership with the farmers Oloff Bergh and William Riordan and with the encouragement of Benjamin Ginsberg.

Bergh harvested a large amount of rooibos in 1925 on his farm Kleinvlei, in the Pakhuis Mountains. Nortier collected seeds in the Pakhuis Mountains (Rocklands) and in a large valley, called Grootkloof, and those first selected seeds are known as the Nortier-type and Redtea-type.

In 1930, Nortier began conducting experiments with the commercial cultivation of the rooibos plant. He cultivated the first plants at Clanwilliam on his farm of Eastside and on the farm of Klein Kliphuis. An aged Khoi woman found an unusual seed source: having chanced upon ants dragging seed, she followed them back to their nest and, on breaking it open, found a granary. Nortier's research was ultimately successful, and he subsequently showed all the local farmers how to germinate their own seeds. Nortier ascertained that seeds require a process of scarification before they are planted in acidic, sandy soil. The seed is gathered by special sifting processes. Nortier is today accepted as the father of the rooibos tea industry.

The variety developed by Nortier has become the mainstay of the rooibos industry enabling it to expand and create income and jobs for inhabitants of rooibos-growing regions. Thanks to Nortier's research, rooibos tea became an iconic national beverage and then a globalised commodity. Production is today the economic mainstay of the Clanwilliam district. In 1948, the University of Stellenbosch awarded Nortier an Honorary Doctorate D.Sc. (Agria) in recognition for his valuable contribution to South African agriculture.

== Botanical features ==
Aspalathus linearis has a small endemic range in the wild, but horticultural techniques to maximise production have been effective at maintaining cultivation as a semi-wild crop to supply the new demands of the broadening rooibos tea industry. A. linearis is often grouped with the honeybush (Cyclopia), another plant from the Fynbos region of Southern Africa, which is also used to make tea. Like other members of the genus, A. linearis is considered a part of the Fynbos ecoregion in the Cape Floristic Region, whose plants often depend on fire for reproduction.

A. linearis is a legume and thus an angiosperm and produces an indehiscent fruit. Its flowers make up a raceme inflorescence. Seed germination can be slow, but sprouting can be induced by acid treatment. The seeds are hard-shelled and often need scarification.

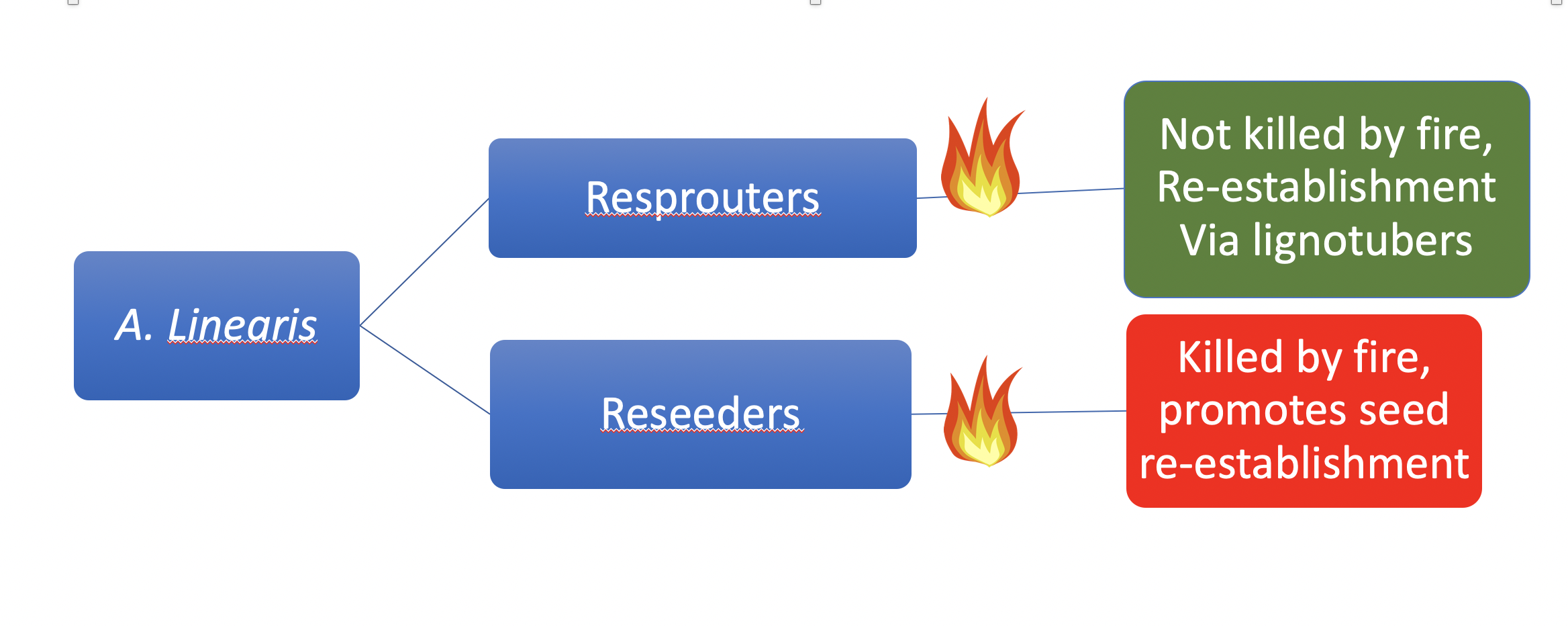
A. linearis response to fire. Plants native to the Fynbos eco-region, like rooibos, are fire dependent, but rooibos varieties exhibit two different adaptions to fire.

For A. linearis, fire can stimulate resprouting in the species, but the sprouting is less than that of other plants in the Fynbos ecoregion. A. linearis can be considered facultative and obligate sprouters and have lignotuber development for after fires. Typically, there are two classifications of A. linearis in response to fire: reseeders and resprouters. Reseeders are killed by fire, but it stimulates their seeds’ germination. Resprouters are not completely killed during a fire and grow back from established lignotubers.

Seeds of wild populations are dispersed by species of ants, whose use as dispersers reduces parent-offspring and sibling-sibling competition. Ants are also helpful in dispersion as they reduce the susceptibility of seeds to other herbivores.

Like in most other legumes, there is a symbiotic relationship between rhizobia bacteria and the underground lignotuber structure that promotes nitrogen fixation and growth. The nitrogen content in the soil is a environmental factor for growth, development, and reproduction. There are multiple ecotypes of A. linearis that have different selected methods of growth and morphology and are dependent on the environment. It is unclear how many ecotypes there might be, given their limited geographic range and the limited literature about genetic diversity. A 1999 study indicated that resprouting populations and reseeding populations were selected to reduce genetic bottlenecks; however, whether that promotes certain reproductive strategies over others was unclear.

Wild populations can contain both sprouting and non-sprouting individuals, but cultivated rooibos are typically reseeders, not resprouters, and have higher growth rates. Cultivated A. linearis can be selected for certain traits that are desirable for human use. Cultivated plants are diploid with a base chromosome number of 9 (2n = 18 chromosomes), but the understanding of how this might differ in ecotypes is limited. The selection process can include human-mediated pollination, fire suppression, and supplementing soil contents.

Like many other Fynbos plants, A. linearis is not significantly pollinated by cape honey bees, which suggests an alternative way of primary pollination. Some wasps likely play an important role in pollinating the flowers and some wasp species are thought to be specially adapted to accessing A. linearis flowers.

=== Environmental concerns ===
The rooibos plant is endemic to a small part of the Western Cape Province, South Africa. It grows in a symbiotic relationship with local micro-organisms. A 2012 South African news item cited concerns regarding the prospects of rooibos farming in the face of climate change.

The use of rooibos and the expansion of its cultivation are threatening other local species of plants endemic to the area such as Protea convexa, Roridula dentata and P. scolymocephala.

== Marketing ==
In 1994, Burke International registered the name "Rooibos" with the US Patent and Trademark Office and so established a monopoly on the name in the United States when the plant was virtually unknown there. When it later entered more widespread use, Burke demanded that companies pay fees to use the name or to cease its use. In 2005, the American Herbal Products Association and a number of import companies defeated the trademark through petitions and lawsuits. After losing one of the cases, Burke surrendered the name to the public domain.

=== Legal protection of the name rooibos ===
The South African Department of Trade and Industry issued final rules on 6 September 2013 that protects and restricts the use of the names "rooibos", "red bush", "rooibostee", "rooibos tea", "rooitee", and "rooibosch" in the country so that the name cannot be used for things unless they are derived from Aspalathus linearis. It also provides guidance and restrictions for how products that include rooibos and in what measures should use the name rooibos in their branding.

In May 2021, the European Union conferred protected designation of origin (PDO) status to "rooibos". Any foodstuff sold as "rooibos" in the EU and several countries outside the bloc must be made by using only Aspalathus linearis leaves that are cultivated in the Cederberg region of South Africa.

=== Market development ===
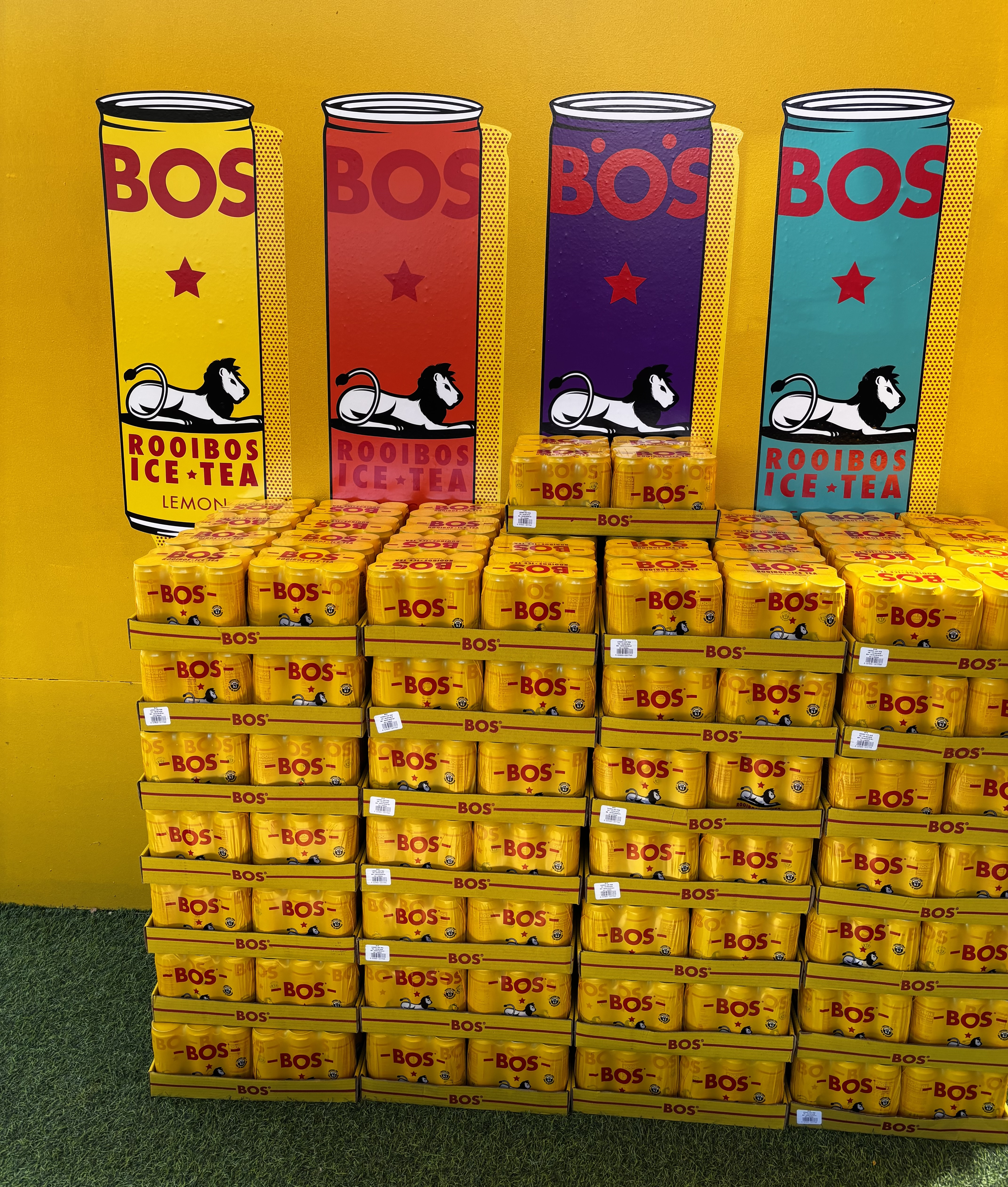
Rooibos iced tea made from Aspalathus linearis leaves

In 2012, the industry for rooibos tea was valued at US$23 billion. As of 2024, global consumption of rooibos tea had increased by 12% over a two year period, with exports surpassing 10,000 tonnes (10 million kg). The teabag is the most common rooibos consumer product. In 2025, Japan was the largest import market, accounting for 33% of South Africa’s total rooibos exports.

== See also ==
- Cyclopia (plant)
- Rooibos wine
