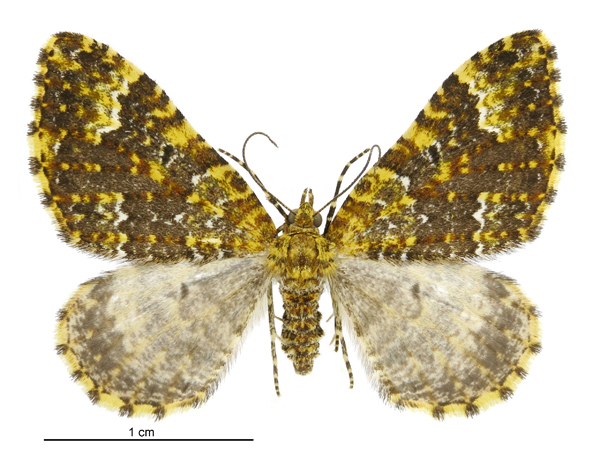
- Female
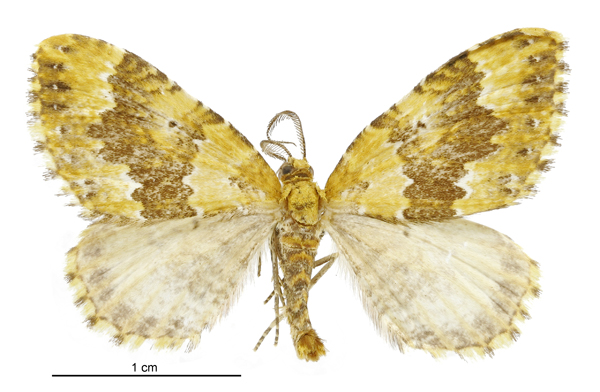
- Male

Scientific classification
- Kingdom: Animalia
- Phylum: Arthropoda
- Clade: Pancrustacea
- Class: Insecta
- Order: Lepidoptera
- Family: Geometridae
- Genus: Asaphodes
- Species: A. prasinias

Binomial name
- Asaphodes prasinias (Meyrick, 1883)

Synonyms
- Larentia prasinias Meyrick, 1883; Xanthorhoe prasinias (Meyrick, 1883)

= Asaphodes prasinias =

Species of moth endemic to New Zealand

Asaphodes prasinias, also known as the yellow and brown carpet moth, is a moth in the family Geometridae. It is endemic to New Zealand and has been found on both the North and South Islands. This species inhabits native forest including beech forest and subalpine scrub. The range of this species has reduced as this species is regarded as being locally extinct in the previously inhabited open non-forest habitats around Invercargill. Adults are on the wing from November to January.

== Taxonomy ==
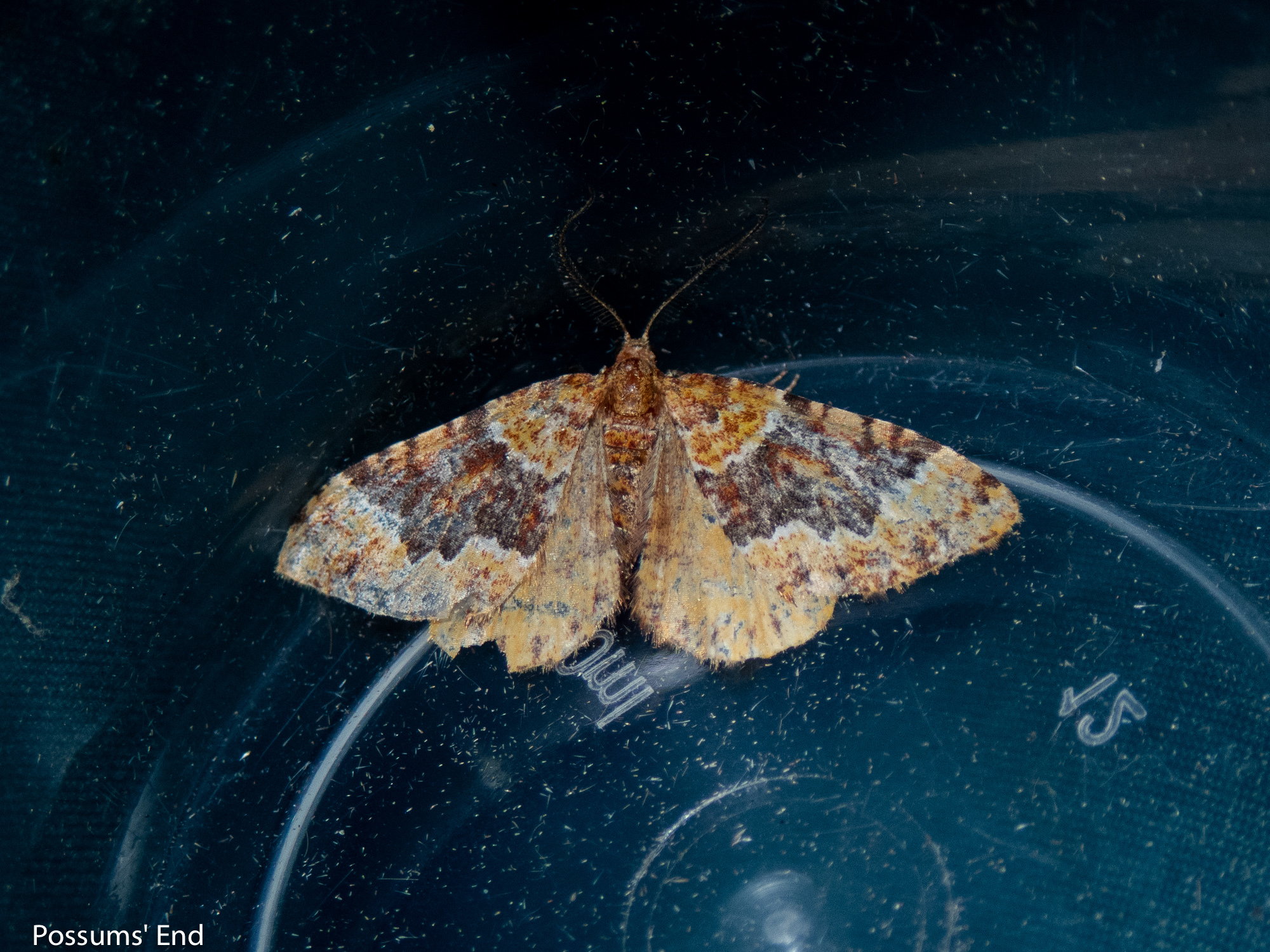
Observation of live A. prasinias

This species was first described in 1883 by Edward Meyrick using specimens collected by Castle Hill in Canterbury by J. D. Enys and named Larentia prasinias. Meyrick gave a fuller description of the species later in 1884. George Hudson discussed the species in his 1898 volume New Zealand moths and butterflies and referred to it as Xanthorhoe prasinias. Hudson discussed and illustrated also this species under that name in his 1928 publication The butterflies and moths of New Zealand. In 1939 Louis Beethoven Prout confirmed the placement of this species in the genus Larentia. This placement was not accepted by New Zealand taxonomists. In 1971 J. S. Dugdale placed this species in the genus Asaphodes. This placement was reaffirmed by Dugdale in 1988. The male lectotype, collected at Castle Hill, is held by the Natural History Museum, London.

== Description ==
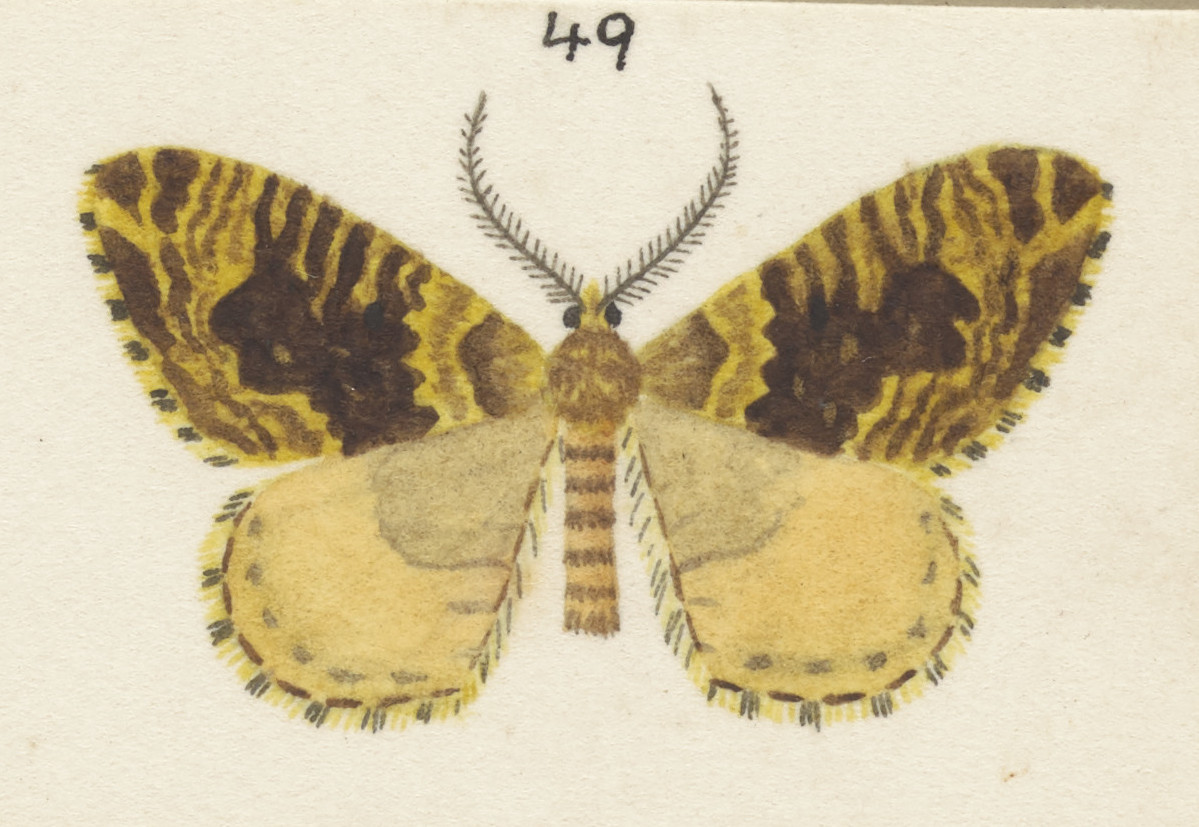
Illustration of male A. prasinias by George Hudson.

Meyrick described this species as follows:

Male, female. 26-29 mm. Forewings moderate, hindmargin slightly sinuate; bright yellow; numerous cloudy confused dentate brownish striae; a moderately broad rather dark fuscous median band, including a large ill defined clear yellow patch on upper half, containing a black dot; its margins dentate, anterior margin concave, posterior margin moderately angulated in middle, sinuate above; a subterminal row of small dark fuscous spots; cilia yellow, barred with dark fuscous. Hindwings moderate, hindmargin rounded; pale yellow; basal half finely and obscurely striated with bluish grey; hindmargin reddish-tinged, with a subterminal row of small grey spots.

The appearance of this species can vary in the depth of ground colour, as well as the width of the transverse lines, on the forewings.

== Distribution ==
This species is endemic to New Zealand in both the North and South Islands. Along with the type locality of Castle Hill this species has also been observed at Mount Taranaki, in the North Island, and at Mount Arthur, Arthur's Pass, Otira, Lake Wakatipu, and Invercargill. Although found in subalpine habitat, in the extreme south of the country, it can be observed in low land situations. The range of this species has reduced as this species is regarded as being locally extinct in the previously inhabited open non-forest habitats around Invercargill.

== Habitat ==
This species inhabits native forest including beech forests and subalpine scrub. Hudson stated that A. prasinias is attracted to Coprosma paviflora.

== Behaviour ==
The adults of this species is on the wing from November to January.

== Hosts ==
The larvae of this species have been raised on species in the genus Ranunculus.
