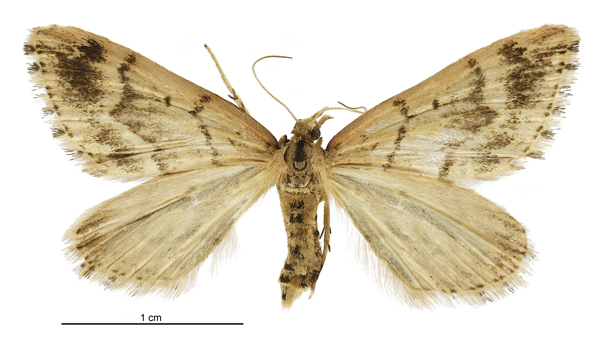
- Female
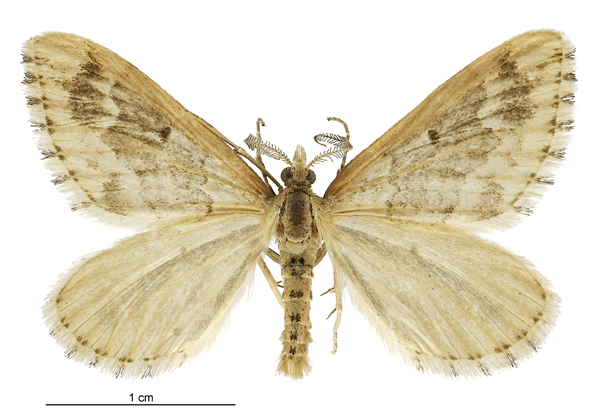
- Male

Scientific classification
- Kingdom: Animalia
- Phylum: Arthropoda
- Clade: Pancrustacea
- Class: Insecta
- Order: Lepidoptera
- Family: Geometridae
- Genus: Asaphodes
- Species: A. aegrota

Binomial name
- Asaphodes aegrota (Philpott, 1915)

Synonyms
- Xanthorhoe albalineata Philpott, 1915; Xanthorhoe albilineata (Philpott, 1915); Larentia albalineata (Philpott, 1915)

= Asaphodes albalineata =

Species of moth, endemic to New Zealand

Asaphodes albalineata is a species of moth in the family Geometridae. It is endemic to New Zealand and has been observed on Stewart Island / Rakiura. This species is similar in appearance to Asaphodes oraria but can be distinguished as it has an unusual pattern on the underside of its hindwings. It inhabits open hill tops and adults are on the wing in December.

== Taxonomy ==
A. albalineata was first described by Alfred Philpott in 1915 under the name Xanthorhoe albalineata from a specimen collected in December, at an altitude of 600 metres, on Table Hill on Stewart Island / Rakiura. In 1928 George Hudson discussed and illustrated this species under the name Xanthorhoe albilineata. In 1939 Louis Beethoven Prout placed this species in the genus Larentia. This placement was not accepted by New Zealand taxonomists. In 1971 J. S. Dugdale placed this species within the genus Asaphodes. In 1988 J. S. Dugdale reaffirmed this placement and stated that although both the original spelling of albalineata, as well as the correction albilineata in a revision by Edward Meyrick, are incorrect, albalineata should be used under ICNZ rules. The male holotype specimen is held in the New Zealand Arthropod Collection.

== Description ==
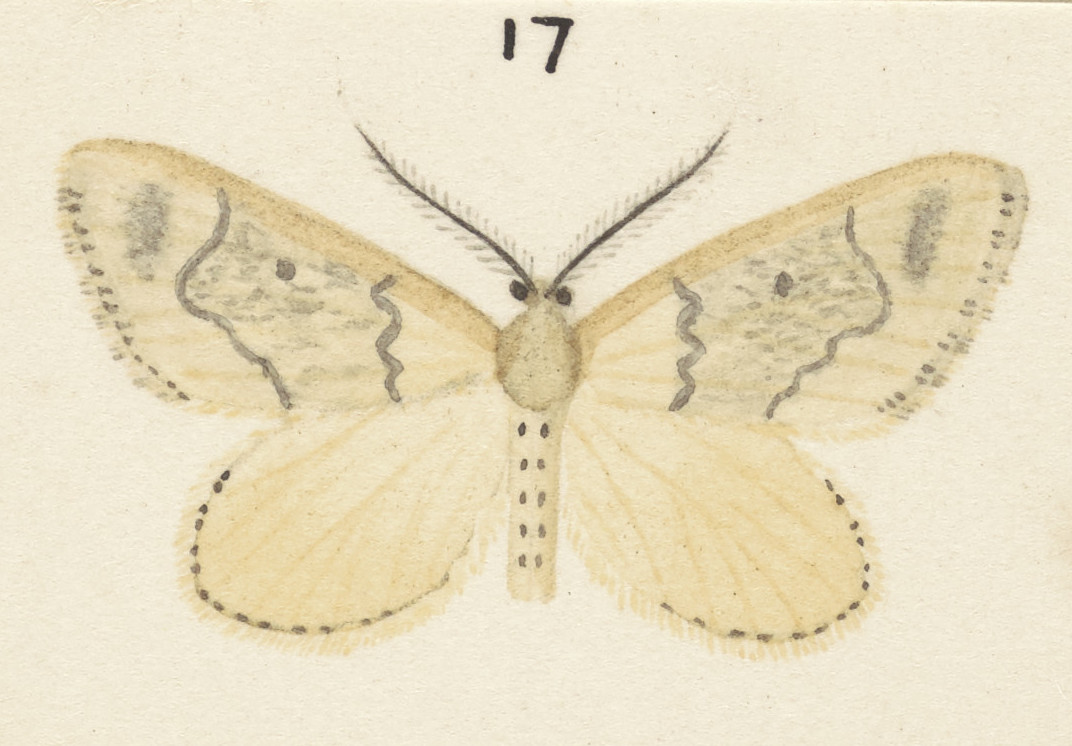
Illustration of A. albalineata by George Hudson.

Philpott originally described this species as follows:

♂ 26–30 mm. Head ochreous, face whitish. Palpi rather elongate, white. Antennae moderately bipectinated, stalk white basally. Thorax brownish-ochreous. Abdomen pale ochreous with paired linear black marks on the dorsal surface of each segment. Forewings triangular, elongate, costa slightly sinuate, hardly arched, apex obtuse, termen bowed, rather oblique; pale whitish - ochreous; markings greyish-fuscous; basal line obscurely indicated, angled above middle; first line from ¼ costa to ⅓ dorsum, irregular, sharply angled inwards above middle; a roundish discal dot; second line from ⅔ costa to ½ dorsum, bluntly projecting at middle, inwardly oblique at dorsum; median band slightly suffused with fuscous in disc and anteriorly to second line; an irregular patch of fuscous suffusion between upper third of second line and termen; a series of paired dots on termen, the apical ones tending to be inwardly produced as paired lines: cilia pale whitish-ochreous with a few dark scales opposite paired dots Hindwings elongate, termen obliquely rounded; pale whitish-ochreous; a terminal series of paired fuscous dots: cilia pale whitish-ochreous. Undersides: Forewings ochreous, disc broadly fuscous; hindwings ochreous; a straight white streak above middle from base to near termen, attenuated posteriorly, margined beneath with brownish-fuscous; a similar streak above dorsum.

This species is similar in appearance to Asaphodes oraria but can be distinguished from that species by the unusual pattern on the underside of its hindwings.

== Distribution ==
This species is endemic to New Zealand and has been observed on Stewart Island / Rakiura.

== Habitat ==
This species inhabits open hill tops.

== Behaviour ==
The adults of this species are on the wing in December.
