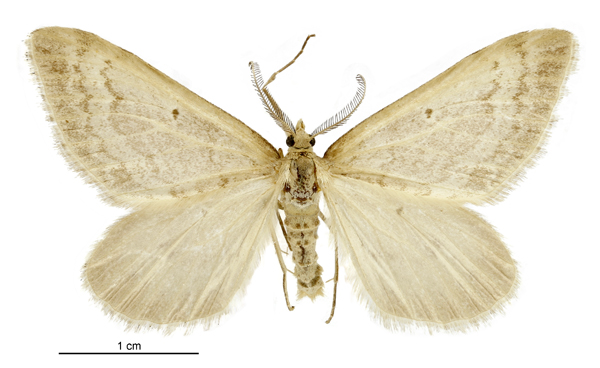
- Male

Scientific classification
- Kingdom: Animalia
- Phylum: Arthropoda
- Clade: Pancrustacea
- Class: Insecta
- Order: Lepidoptera
- Family: Geometridae
- Genus: Asaphodes
- Species: A. nephelias

Binomial name
- Asaphodes nephelias (Meyrick, 1883)

Synonyms
- Larentia nephelias Meyrick, 1883; Xanthorhoe nephelias (Meyrick, 1883); Xanthorhoe subflava Howes, 1917

= Asaphodes nephelias =

Species of moth

Asaphodes nephelias is a moth in the family Geometridae. It is endemic to New Zealand and has been observed in the South Island. The preferred habitat of this species is alpine tussock grasslands above native forest and in wetlands. The adults of this species are on the wing from January to March and are day flying. The female has brachypterous wings.

== Taxonomy ==
This species was first described in 1883 by Edward Meyrick using specimens collected at Arthur's Pass at 4600 ft in January and named Larentia nephelias. Meyrick gave a fuller description later in 1884. George Hudson discussed the species in his 1898 volume New Zealand moths and butterflies and referred to it as Xanthorhoe nephelias. Hudson discussed and illustrated this species under that name in his 1928 publication The butterflies and moths of New Zealand. In the same publication Hudson synonymised Xanthorhoe subflava with this species. In 1971 J. S. Dugdale placed this species within the genus Asaphodes. In 1988 Dugdale confirmed this placement. The male lectotype is held at the Natural History Museum, London.

== Description ==
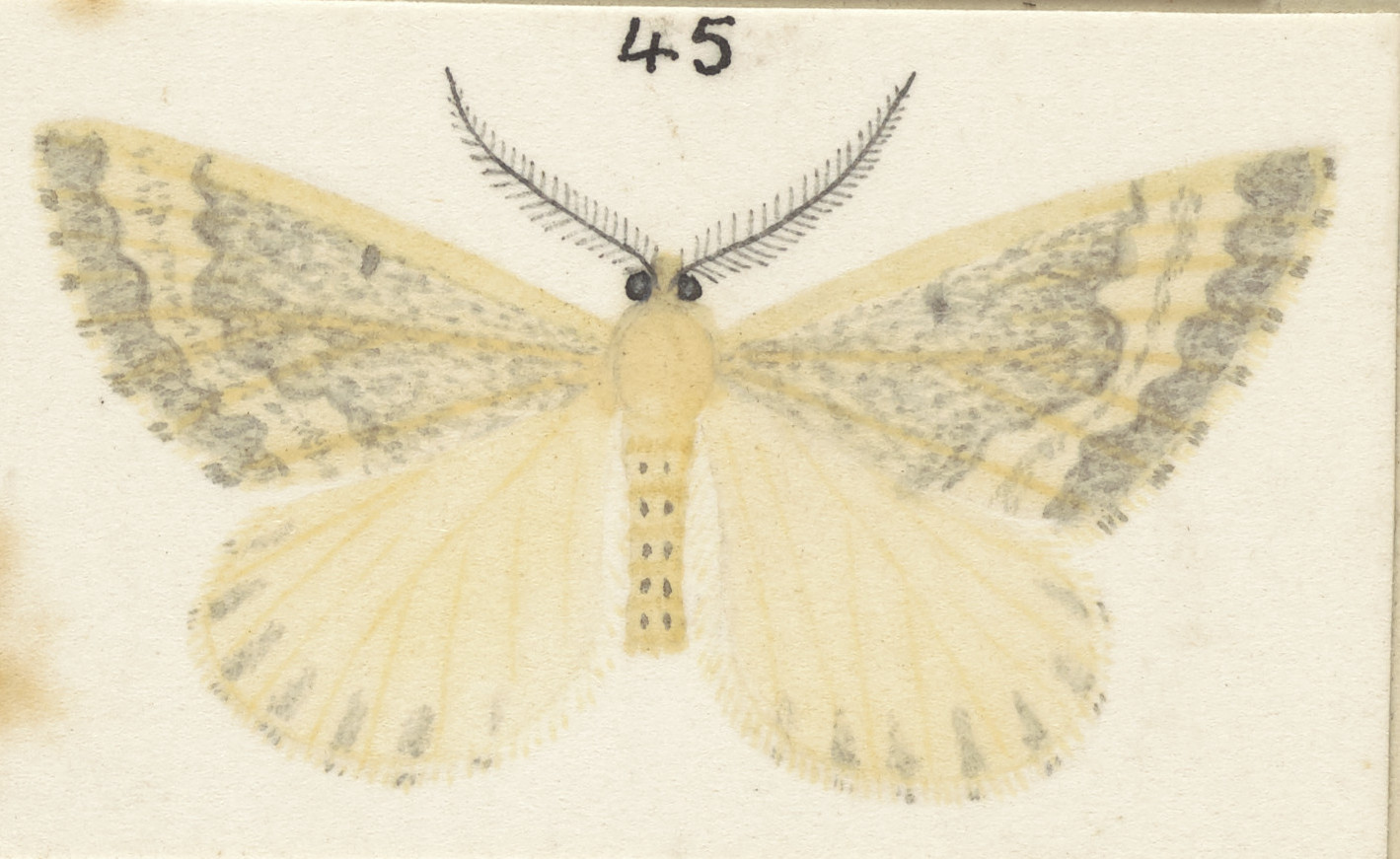
Illustration of A. nephelias by George Hudson.

Meyrick first described this species as follows:

Pale whitish-grey, slightly ochreous; a discal dot, sinuate line beyond middle, and two rows of cloudy spots before hind margin dark fuscous.

Meyrick gave a fuller description in 1884 and stated:

Male, female. — 32-34 mm. Forewings moderate, in female narrower and more elongate, hindmargin rounded; pale whitish-grey, slightly ochreous-tinged; an indistinct suffusion of dark fuscous scales before middle; a small dark fuscous discal dot; a rather irregular cloudy dark fuscous line beyond middle, sinuate beneath costa, shortly angulated in middle; a very faint stria beyond this; a hindmarginal band composed of two rows of cloudy partially confluent dark fuscous spots, separating on costa : cilia pale whitish-grey. Hindwings moderate, in female narrower, hindmargin rounded; ground-colour as in forewings, with a few grey scales posteriorly.

The female of this species is brachypterous.

== Distribution ==
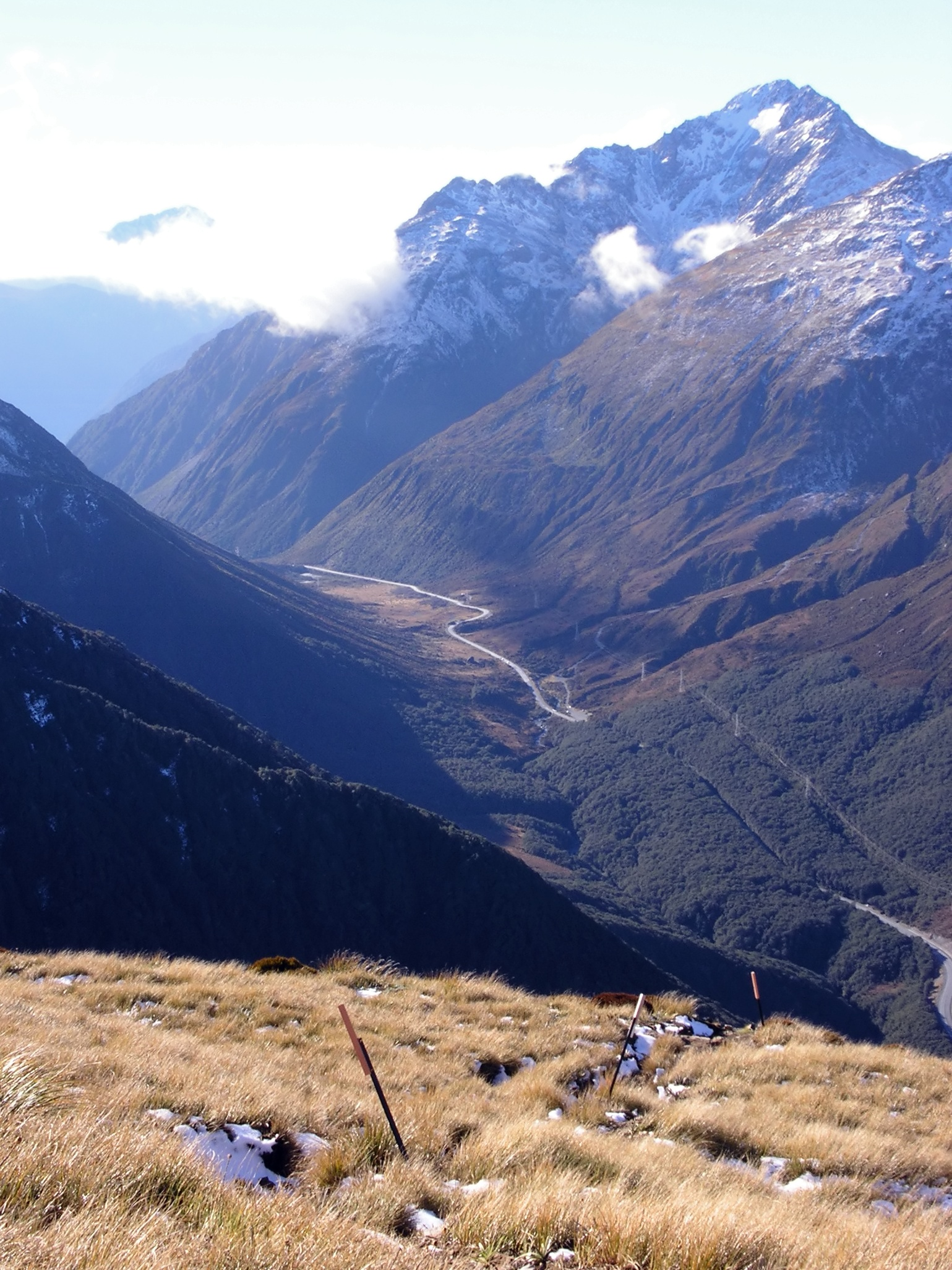
Arthur's Pass, type locality of A. nephelias.

This species is endemic to New Zealand and has been collected in Arthur's Pass and Mount Arthur. This species has also been collected in Central Otago including on Ben Lomond, Nevis Valley as well as at Danseys Pass.

== Behaviour ==
The adults of this species are on the wing from January to March and are day flying.

== Habitat ==
This species is found in alpine tussock grasslands above native forest. It has also been observed in wetlands in Otago at the Danseys Pass as well as the Nevis Red Tussock Fen.
