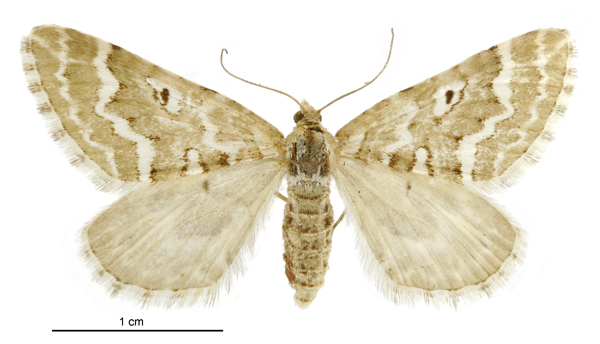
- Female
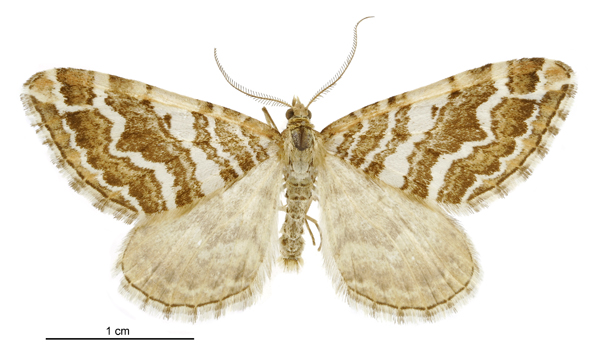
- Male

Scientific classification
- Kingdom: Animalia
- Phylum: Arthropoda
- Clade: Pancrustacea
- Class: Insecta
- Order: Lepidoptera
- Family: Geometridae
- Genus: Asaphodes
- Species: A. declarata

Binomial name
- Asaphodes declarata (Prout, 1914)

Synonyms
- Xanthorhoe declarata Prout, 1914

= Asaphodes declarata =

Species of moth

Asaphodes declarata is a species of moth in the family Geometridae. This species is endemic to New Zealand and has been observed in the southern parts of the South Island. This species prefers open tussock grassland habitat amounts beech forest and in mountainous terrain. It can be found at altitudes of between 450 and 1750 m. The adults of this species are on the wing from November to March. The moths can vary both in size and, with the female of the species, in markings.

== Taxonomy ==
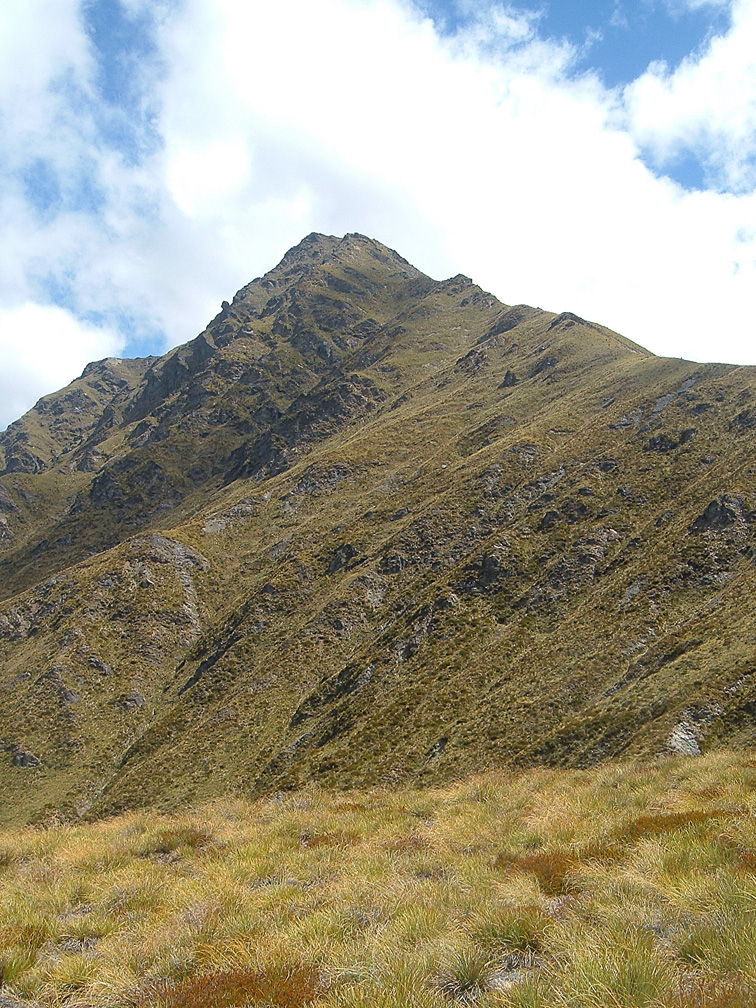
Ben Lomond, type locality of A. declarata.

This species was described by Louis Beethoven Prout in 1914 as Xanthorhoe declarata using material collected by George Howes at Ben Lomond in Otago in February. George Hudson discussed and illustrated this species under the name Xanthorhoe declarata in his 1928 publication The Butterflies and Moths of New Zealand. However Hudson made an error, giving the incorrect name of the discoverer of the species, as well as the incorrect type locality.

In 1987 Robin C. Craw proposed assigning this species to the genus Asaphodes. In 1988 John S. Dugdale agreed with this proposal. The holotype specimen is held at the Natural History Museum, London.

== Description ==
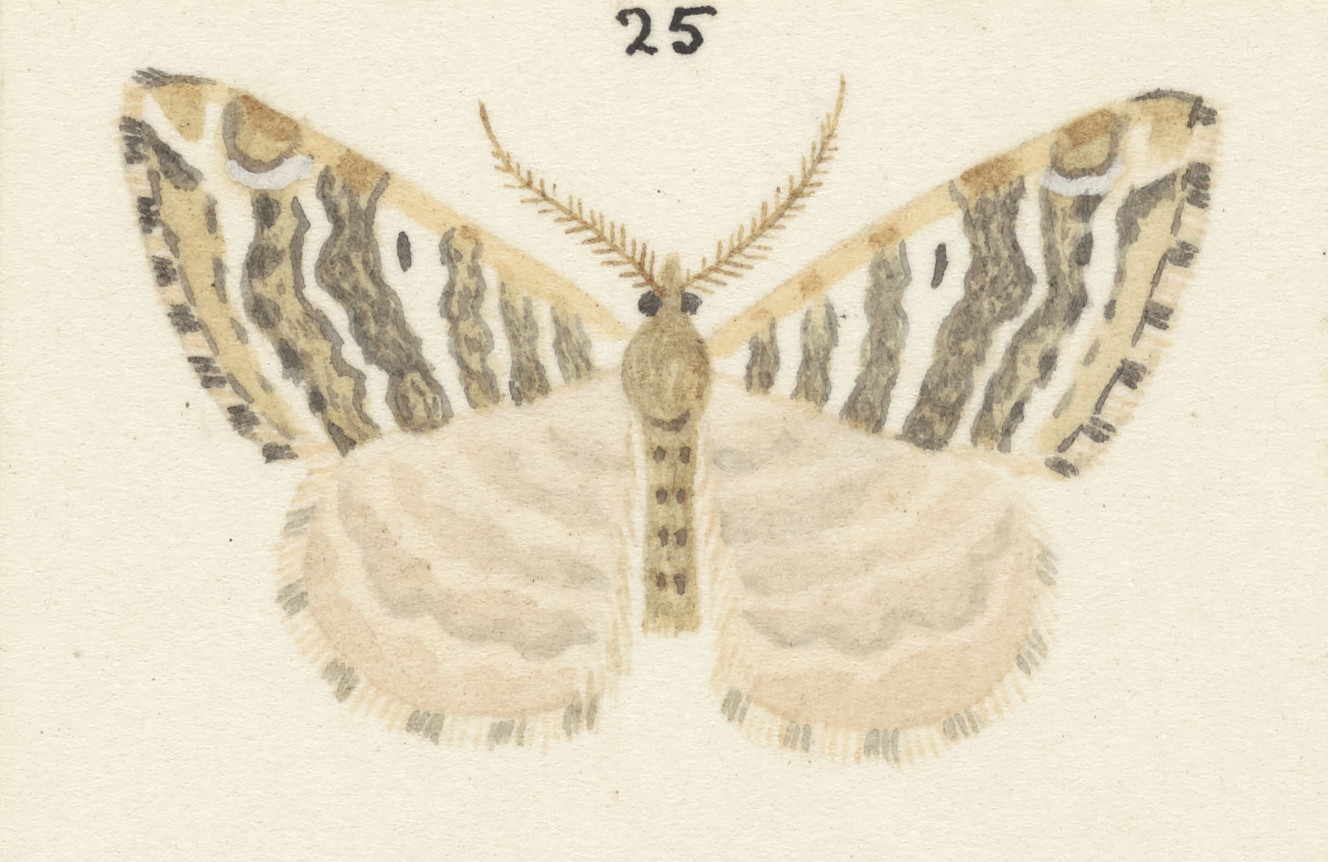
Illustration of A. declarata by George Hudson.

Prout described the species as follows:

♂︎. 36-38 mm. Very closely related to X. clarata Walk., but apparently quite distinct. Differs in the greyer brown (not ochreous) markings of the forewing and the white (not yellow or ochreous) hindwing. Forewing with the second subbasal white fascia less strongly curved; discal dot enlarged, touching the first post-discal fuscous line; outer boundary of median area less deeply inbent on fold; white subterminal line less deeply dentate. The first fuscous post-discal line, though too variable in both species to give a constant distinction, is, as a rule, sharply out-angled between veins 6 and 7 in clarata, but in declarata only very obtusely bent or very gently curved. The hindwing beneath differs still more markedly : in clarata its basal half, though partly dark-marked, is encroached upon by a deep and large pale prong running inwards at vein 5 as far as the discocellulars (in some, measure even to the base) and another on the fold; in declarata the basal half is much more uniformly dark-marked, its distal edge only forming two very moderate inward bends. Abdomen also whitish, dorsally with pairs of rather dark spots.

Hudson noted that this species could easily be confused with a faded specimen of Asaphodes clarata. He also pointed out that A. declarata varies considerably in both size and, with the female of the species, in markings.

== Distribution ==
This species is endemic to New Zealand. This species has been found in Otago and Southland.

== Biology and life cycle ==
Hudson stated that A. declarata can be found on the wing from November until February. Adults have also been recorded in March.

== Habitat ==
A. declarata prefers open tussock habitat amongst beech forest in mountainous terrain. It can be found at elevations of between 450 and 1750m in altitude.
