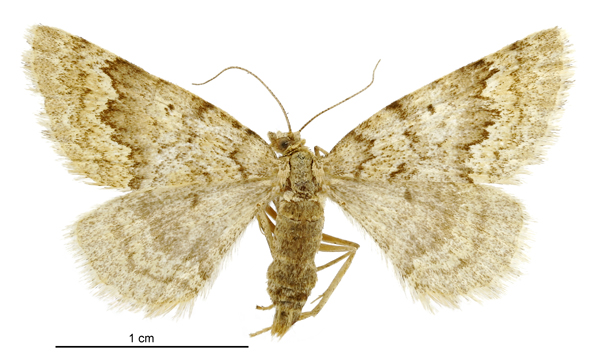
- Female
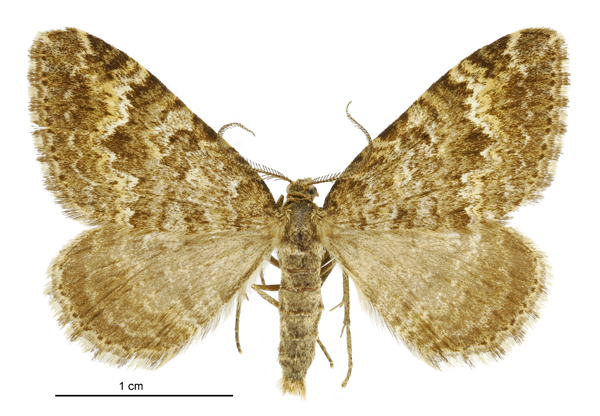
- Male

Scientific classification
- Kingdom: Animalia
- Phylum: Arthropoda
- Clade: Pancrustacea
- Class: Insecta
- Order: Lepidoptera
- Family: Geometridae
- Genus: Asaphodes
- Species: A. cosmodora

Binomial name
- Asaphodes cosmodora (Meyrick, 1888)

Synonyms
- Larentia cosmodora Meyrick, 1888; Xanthorhoe cosmodora (Meyrick, 1888); Larentia bryopis Meyrick, 1888; Xanthorhoe bryopis (Meyrick, 1888); Asaphodes bryopis (Meyrick, 1888)

= Asaphodes cosmodora =

Species of moth

Asaphodes cosmodora is a species of moth in the family Geometridae. This species is endemic to New Zealand and has been observed in the South Island. The adults of this species are on the wing in January and February.

== Taxonomy ==
A. cosmodora was described by Edward Meyrick in 1888 as Larentia cosmodora using material he collected at Gordon's Pyramid on Mount Arthur in January. George Hudson also discussed this species under the name Xanthorhoe clarata in both 1898 and in 1928. In 1971 J. S. Dugdale confirmed the placement of this species in the genus Asaphodes. In 1988 Dugdale confirmed this placement in his catalogue of New Zealand Lepidoptera. Dugdale also proposed that the species Asaphodes bryopis be synonymised with A. cosmodora. The female holotype specimen is held at the Natural History Museum, London.

== Description ==
Meyrick originally described the species as follows:

Female. — 27 mm. Head, palpi, antennae, thorax, abdomen, and legs whitish-ochreous, slightly brownish-tinged; abdomen with a double dorsal series of dark fuscous dots. Forewings with costa hardly perceptibly arched, hindmargin slightly rounded, oblique; whitish-ochreous, slightly yellowish-tinged; a curved irregular black line rather near base, followed by a white line; median band rather darker, tinged with yellowish-fuscous towards edges, margined with dentate black lines and outside these with white, anterior from 1/3 of costa to 2/5 of inner margin, rather curved, posterior from 2/3 of costa to 3/4 of inner margin, somewhat prominent beneath costa, and with a more distinct double prominence in middle; two white dentate-edged spots within median band, first beneath costa, containing small black discal dot, second on inner margin; a waved white subterminal line; a fine dark fuscous hindmarginal line interrupted into numerous dots: cilia whitish-ochreous, with dark fuscous bars hardly reaching base. Hindwings whitish-ochreous, with faint darker greyish-tinged lines; a median band of four more distinct cloudy grey lines, first three straight, fourth well-marked, rather dark fuscous, waved, somewhat prominent in middle, beneath confluent with third; a faint white subterminal line; cilia pale whitish-ochreous, with a faint greyish line tending to form spots.

== Distribution ==
This species is endemic to New Zealand. Along with mountainous areas in the Kahurangi National Park, this species has also been found in the Dansey ecological district in Otago at altitudes of between 1000 and 1300 m.

== Biology and life cycle ==
A. cosmodora can be found on the wing in January and February.
