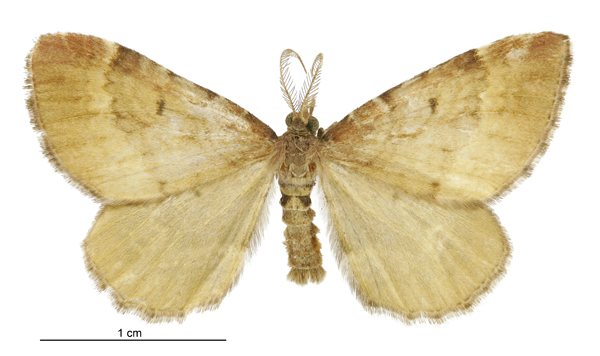
- Male

Conservation status
- Nationally Critical (NZ TCS)

Scientific classification
- Kingdom: Animalia
- Phylum: Arthropoda
- Clade: Pancrustacea
- Class: Insecta
- Order: Lepidoptera
- Family: Geometridae
- Genus: Asaphodes
- Species: A. imperfecta

Binomial name
- Asaphodes imperfecta (Philpott, 1905)

Synonyms
- Xanthorhoe imperfecta Philpott, 1905; Larentia imperfecta (Philpott, 1905)

= Asaphodes imperfecta =

Species of moth

Asaphodes imperfecta is a moth in the family Geometridae. It is endemic to New Zealand and is found in the southern part of the South Island. The species inhabits low lying swampy native forest. The host plants of the larvae of this species is unknown. The adults are on the wing in December and January. It is classified as critically endangered by the Department of Conservation.

== Taxonomy ==
This species was first described by Alfred Philpott in 1905 as Xanthorhoe imperfecta. Philpott used specimens he collected in the West Plains suburb of Invercargill. George Hudson discussed and illustrated this species under that name in 1928. In 1939 Louis Beethoven Prout placed this species in the genus Larentia. This placement was not accepted by New Zealand taxonomists. In 1971 J. S. Dugdale placed this species in the genus Asaphodes. In 1988 John S. Dugdale confirmed this placement. The male holotype specimen, collected at West Plains, Invercargill, is held at the New Zealand Arthropod Collection.

== Description ==
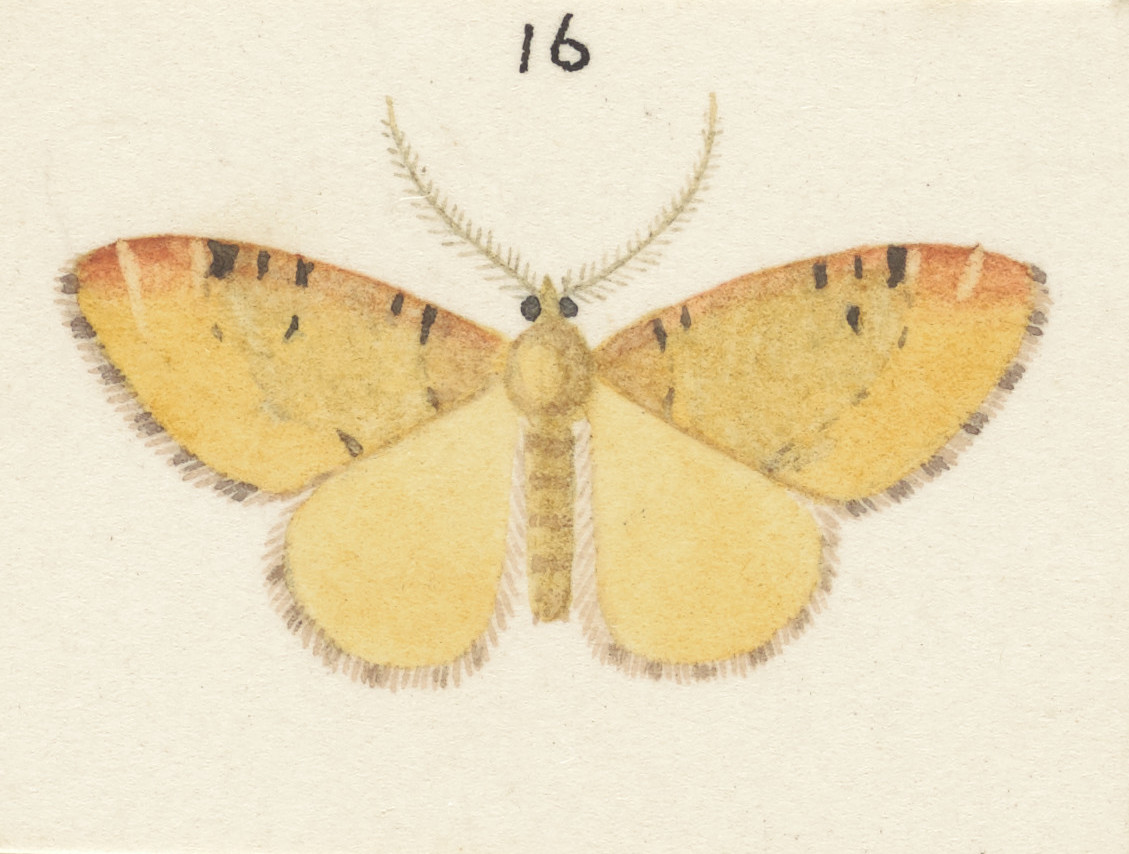
Illustration of A. imperfecta by George Hudson.

Philpott described A. imperfecta as follows:

29 mm. Head, thorax, and abdomen brownish-ochreous. Fore wings ochreous, in male often reddish on costa and about apex. The usual lines are in the male reduced to irregular blackish costal spots; in the female these costal spots give rise to very faint transverse waved lines. White spots follow most of the dark costal spots, and there is a fairly conspicuous pair at 2/3; cilia ochreous, barred with blackish. Hind wings ochreous; cilia greyish-ochreous mixed with darker. Nearest to X. ceyrota, but easily distinguished by the brighter ground-colour and the white costal spots.

== Distribution ==
Asaphodes imperfecta is endemic to New Zealand. The species was regarded as being rare and local to the southern part of the South Island. It is now regarded as being locally extinct in its type locality of Invercargill. George Vernon Hudson mentions that it was also present in Dunedin.

== Ecology and habitat ==
Adult moths had been collected in forest and Hudson stated the species preferred low lying swampy forest habitat. Hudson also stated that adult moths were on the wing in December and January.

== Host plants ==
The host plants of this species are unknown.

== Conservation status ==
In 2015 this moth was classified under the New Zealand Threat Classification system as being Nationally Critical. It has been hypothesised that this species is under threat as a likely result of habitat loss, given the drying out of ecosystems as a result of wetland drainage which in turn ensures the land no longer supports the plants the species lives on in its larvae stage. This classification was confirmed in 2025 with the qualifier that this species is in need of conservation research.
