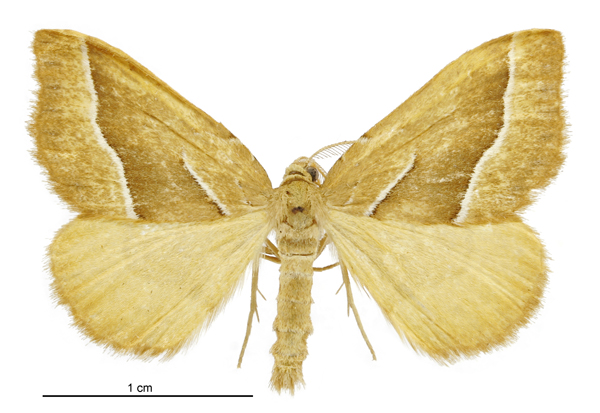
- Male
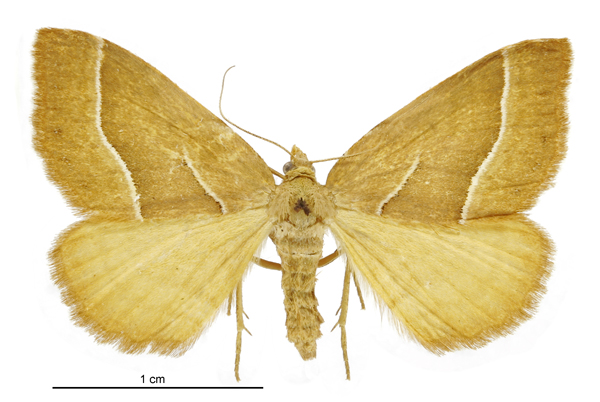
- Female

Conservation status
- Nationally Vulnerable (NZ TCS)

Scientific classification
- Kingdom: Animalia
- Phylum: Arthropoda
- Clade: Pancrustacea
- Class: Insecta
- Order: Lepidoptera
- Family: Geometridae
- Genus: Asaphodes
- Species: A. stinaria

Binomial name
- Asaphodes stinaria (Guenée, 1868)

Synonyms
- Camptogramma stinaria Guenée, 1868; Xanthorhoe stinaria (Guenée, 1868); Larentia stinaria (Guenée, 1868)

= Asaphodes stinaria =

Species of moth endemic to New Zealand

Asaphodes stinaria is a moth in the family Geometridae. It is endemic to New Zealand and has previously been observed in both the North and South Islands. The range of this species has contracted and it has recently only been located in Westland, Otago and Southland. This species inhabits wetlands, tussock country, and in grassy openings in native forest. The larval host species has been hypothesised as being 'hairy' Ranunculus species however as at 2000 this hasn't been confirmed. It is classified as Nationally Vulnerable by the Department of Conservation. There has been considerable reductions of the range of this species with it possibly becoming extinct in eastern parts of New Zealand.

== Taxonomy ==
A. stinaria was first described by Achille Guenée in 1868 from a specimen collected in Canterbury by Richard William Fereday. Guenée named the species Camptogramma stinaria. In 1898 George Vernon Hudson subsequently placed this species within the genus Xanthorhoe. In 1971 John S. Dugdale assigned Xanthorhoe stinaria to the genus Asaphodes. He confirmed this placement in 1988. The male holotype specimen is held at the Natural History Museum, London.

== Description ==
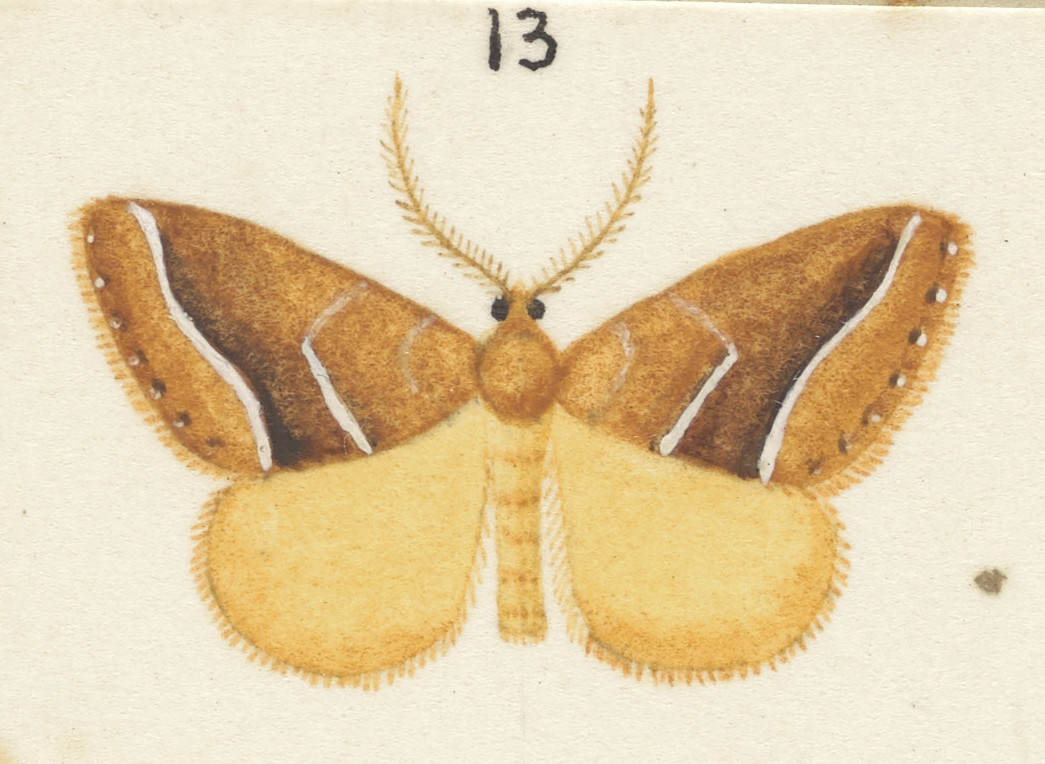
Illustration of A. stinaria by George Hudson.

Guenée described the species as follows:

Superior wings ochreous-yellow, suffused with blackish; the only markings are two distant lines, the first forming a single angle in the cellule, the second simply wavy, these lines are slender, white, narrowly bordered with black on the costa, where they approach nearer one to the other, and followed by a brownish tinge; extremity of the fringes finely marked with white; inferior wings ochreous-yellow, without markings above, but beneath they are powdered with red, and traversed by six parallel lines, of which the four first are placed close together and discoidal, the two others isolated and toothed. Body concoloroua, without markings. Antennas of the male furnished with long pubescent and spatulated pectinations.

== Distribution ==
A. stinaria is endemic to New Zealand. This species has historically occurred in the following areas but has not been located there recently: Taupo, Hawkes Bay, North Canterbury, Mid Canterbury, South Canterbury, Dunedin and Fiordland. Areas where it has been located recently include Westland, Central Otago, Otago Lakes and Southland.

== Ecology and habitat ==
Adults of the species emerge during the months of November until March with December being the most common month in which the adult moth has been collected. A. stinaria has been found in wetlands, tussock country, open non-forest habitat as well as grassy openings in forested habitat.

== Host plants ==
Fereday is recorded to have stated that this species frequented Carex subdola. It is currently thought that A. stinaria is associated with a 'hairy' Ranunculus species. However at present the name of the specific host species is unconfirmed.

== Conservation status ==
This species has considerably reduced its range in recent times. It is regarded as possibly becoming extinct in the eastern parts of New Zealand. The moth has therefore been classified under the New Zealand Threat Classification system as being Nationally Vulnerable. It has been suggested that the decline of this moth is as a result of habitat destruction and the overgrazing of its possible host plant.
