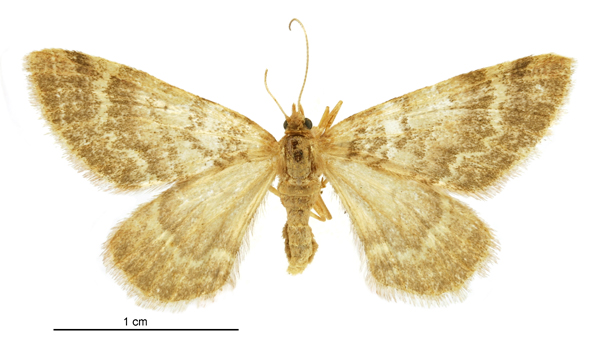
- Female
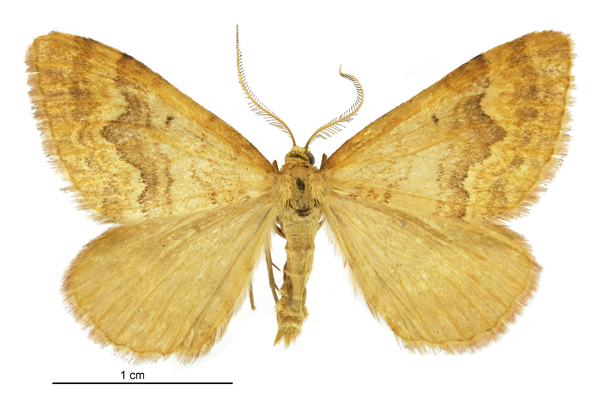
- Male

Scientific classification
- Kingdom: Animalia
- Phylum: Arthropoda
- Clade: Pancrustacea
- Class: Insecta
- Order: Lepidoptera
- Family: Geometridae
- Genus: Asaphodes
- Species: A. aphelias

Binomial name
- Asaphodes aphelias (Prout, 1939)

Synonyms
- Xanthorhoe aphelias Prout, 1939; Xanthorhoe helias obscura Philpott, 1921

= Asaphodes aphelias =

Species of moth

Asaphodes aphelias is a species of moth in the family Geometridae. It is endemic to New Zealand and has been observed in Fiordland. This species inhabits damp native scrub and has been observed in upland wetlands at altitudes of between 800 and 1100 m. Adults are on the wing in February but the female of this species is unusual as it has narrow fore and hind wings.

== Taxonomy ==
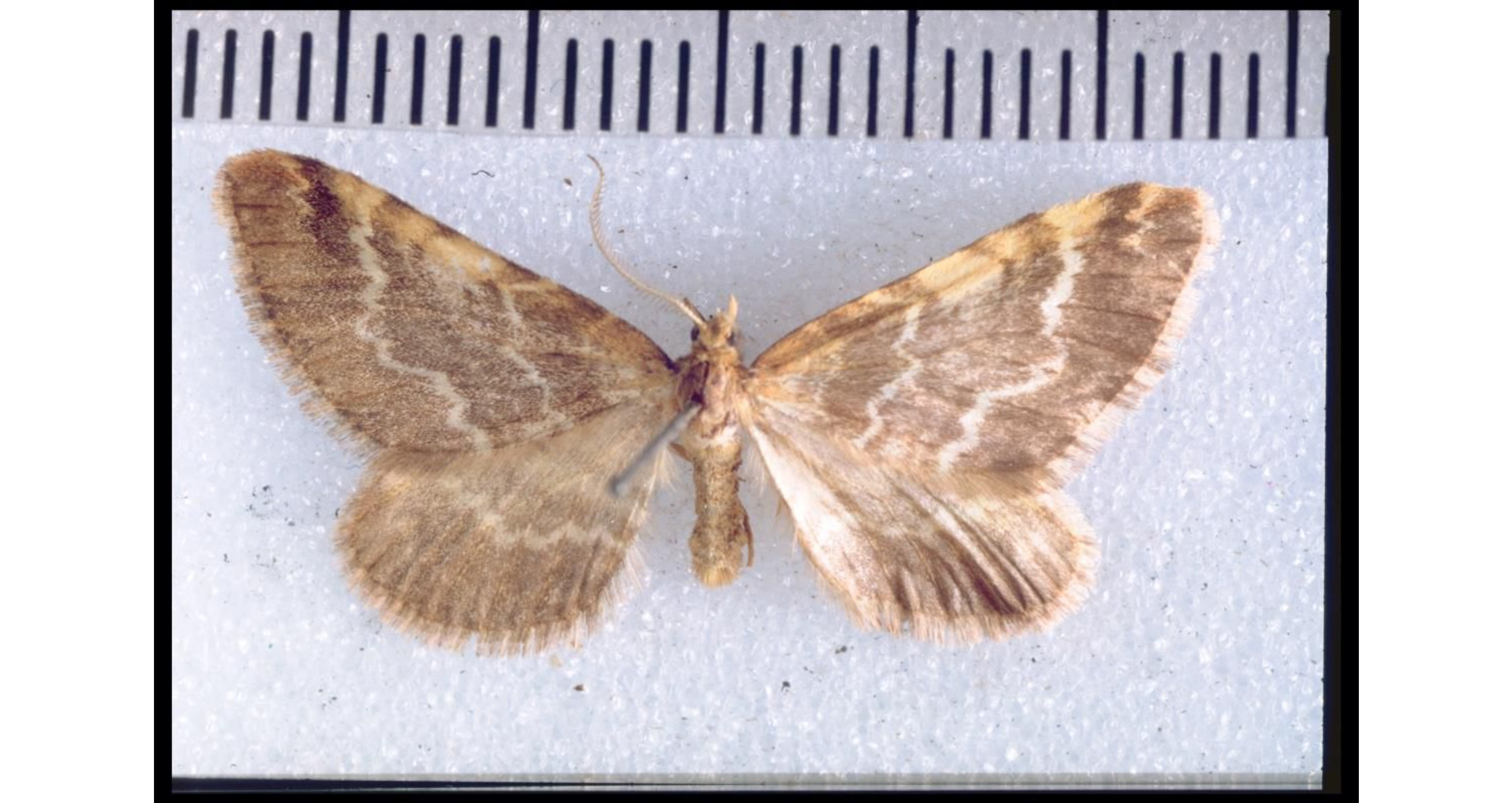
A. aphelias male holotype

This species was first described by Philpott under the name Xanthorhoe helias obscura. In 1939 George Hudson discussed and illustrated this species under the name Xanthorhoe obscura. In 1939 Louis Beethoven Prout provided a new name for this species, naming it Xanthorhoe aphelias. Prout did so as the species originally named Scotocoremia obscura Butler, 1882 was at that point in time placed in the genus Xanthorhoe and Philpott had raised Xanthorhoe helias obscura to the rank of species. In 1971 J. S. Dugdale placed this species in the genus Asaphodes. In 1988 Dugdale affirmed this placement in his catalogue of New Zealand Lepidoptera. The holotype specimen, a male collected from Hump Ridge in Fiordland by Alfred Philpott, is held at the New Zealand Arthropod Collection.

== Description ==
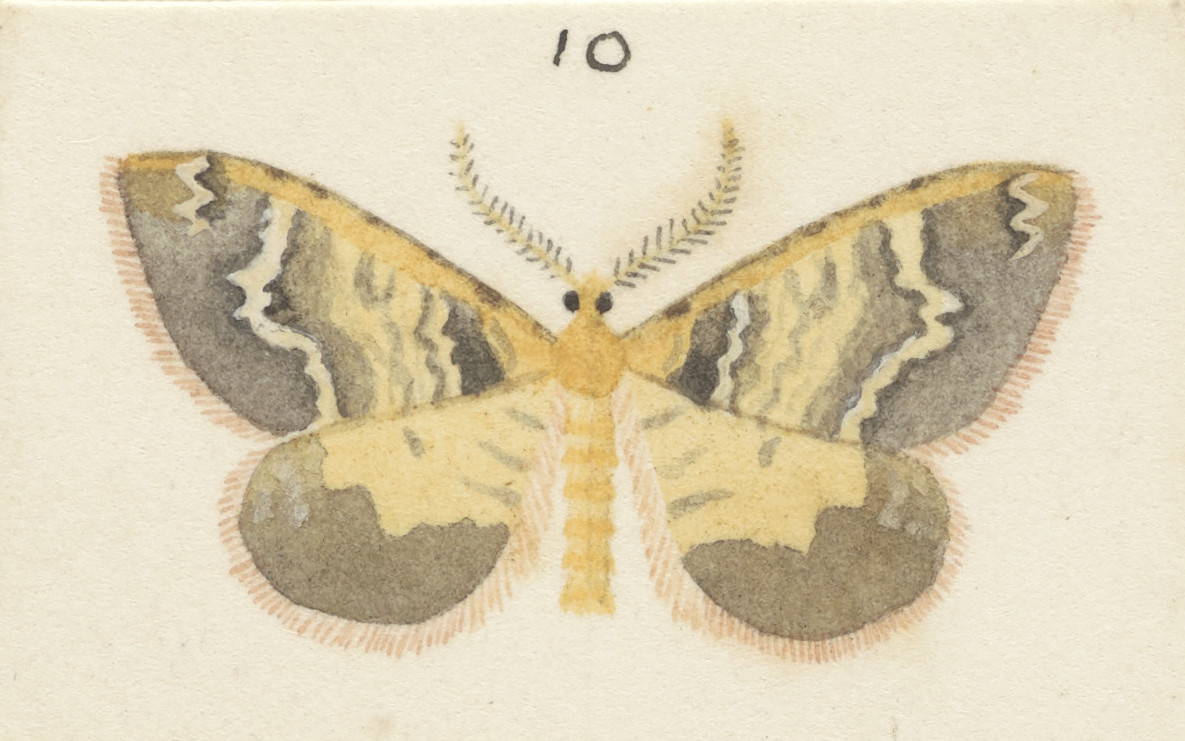
A. aphelias illustrated by George Hudson as Xanthorhoe obscura

Philpott first described this species, as a subspecies, as follows:

♂♀. 26–30 mm. Head and palpi ochreous, the latter usually darker. Antennae, shaft whitish-ochreous, pectinations darker. Thorax ochreous, tinged with reddish on shoulders. Abdomen ochreous mixed with fuscous, anal tuft bright ochreous. Legs whitish-ochreous, anterior pair suffused with fuscous. Forewings dull fuscous shading to ochreous along costa; first and second lines distinct, narrow, white; subterminal thin, whitish, sometimes partially obsolete: cilia pink. Hindwings ochreous, apical half fuscous; second line prominent, irregular, whitish, anteriorly fuscous-margined; one or two parallel ochreous lines sometimes follow second line, and there are indications occasionally of preceding lines also: cilia pink.

The female of this species is unusual as it has narrow fore and hind wings.

== Distribution ==
This species is endemic to New Zealand. It has been observed in Fiordland.

== Habitat ==
A. apelias inhabits damp native scrub and has been observed in upland wetlands at altitudes of between 800 and 1100 m.

== Behaviour ==
The adults of this species are on the wing in February.
