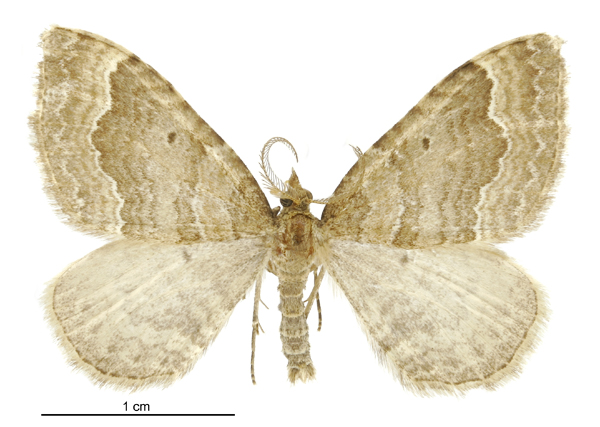
- Male
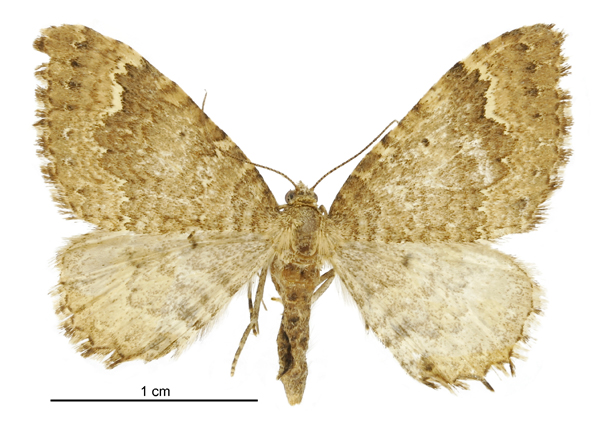
- Female

Scientific classification
- Kingdom: Animalia
- Phylum: Arthropoda
- Clade: Pancrustacea
- Class: Insecta
- Order: Lepidoptera
- Family: Geometridae
- Genus: Asaphodes
- Species: A. chionogramma

Binomial name
- Asaphodes chionogramma (Meyrick, 1883)

Synonyms
- Larentia chionogramma Meyrick, 1883; Xanthorhoe chionogramma (Meyrick, 1883)

= Asaphodes chionogramma =

Species of moth endemic to New Zealand

Asaphodes chionogramma is a moth in the family Geometridae. It is endemic to New Zealand and found in both the North and South Islands. This species inhabits the lower slopes of mountains in valleys with native forest at altitudes of between 2000 and 3000 ft. The adults of this species are on the wing in December and January.

== Taxonomy ==
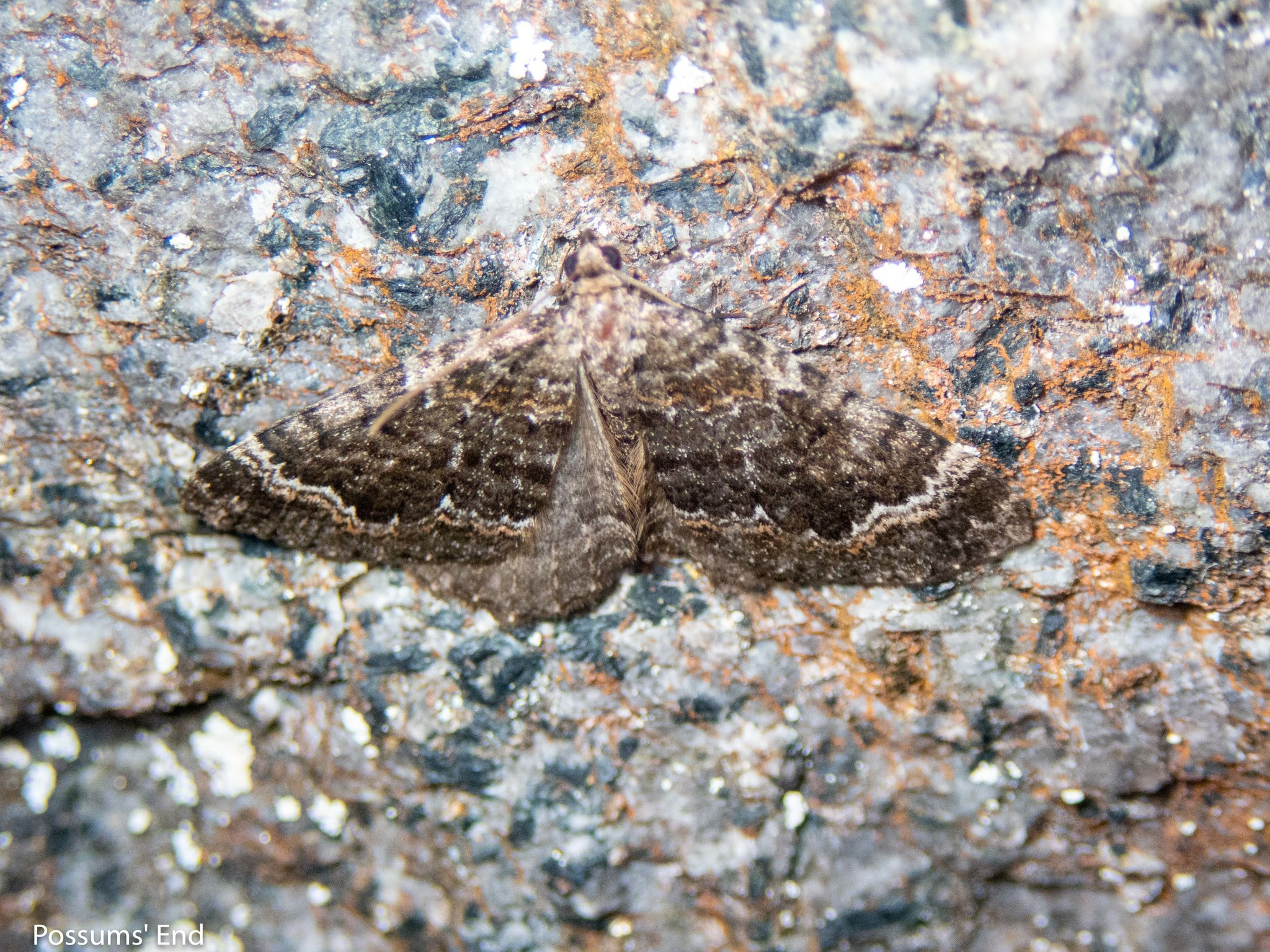
Live observation of A. chionogramma

This species was first described by Edward Meyrick in 1883 as Larentia chionogramma. Meyrick gave a fuller description of the species later in 1884. George Hudson discussed and illustrated the species in his 1898 volume New Zealand Moths and Butterflies and referred to it as Xanthorhoe chionogramma. He also discussed and illustrated this species using that same name in his 1928 publication. In 1971 J. S. Dugdale placed this species in the genus Asaphodes. This placement was reaffirmed by Dugdale in 1988. The male lectotype, collected at Mount Hutt, is held at the Natural History Museum, London.

== Description ==
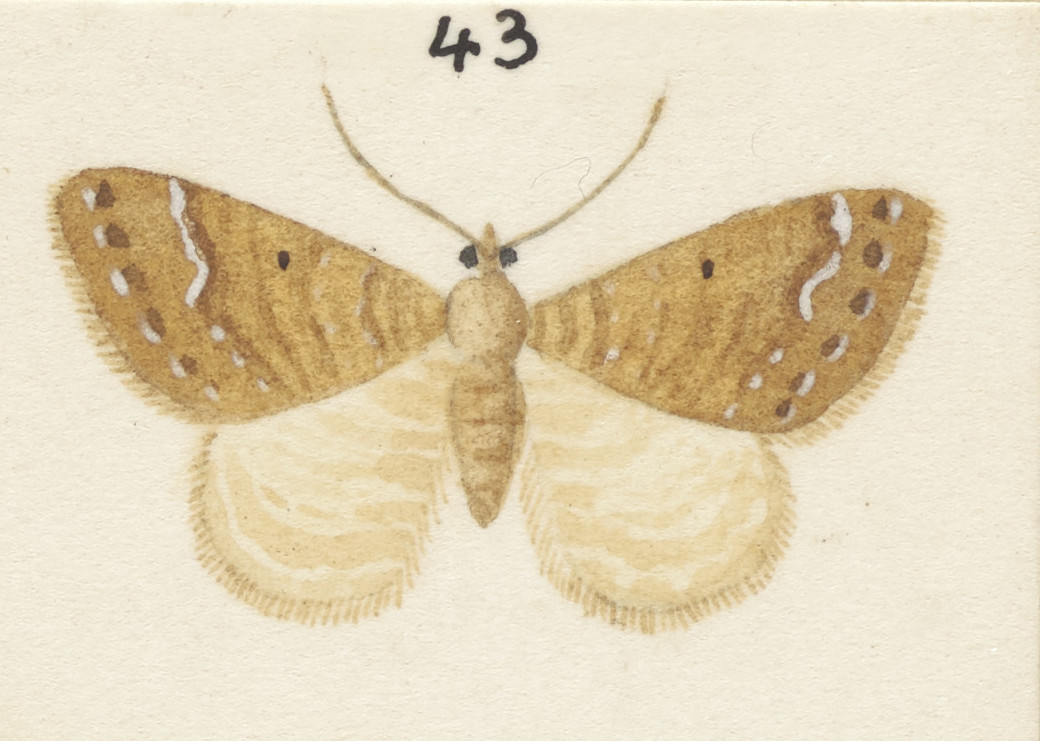
Illustration of male A. chionogramma.

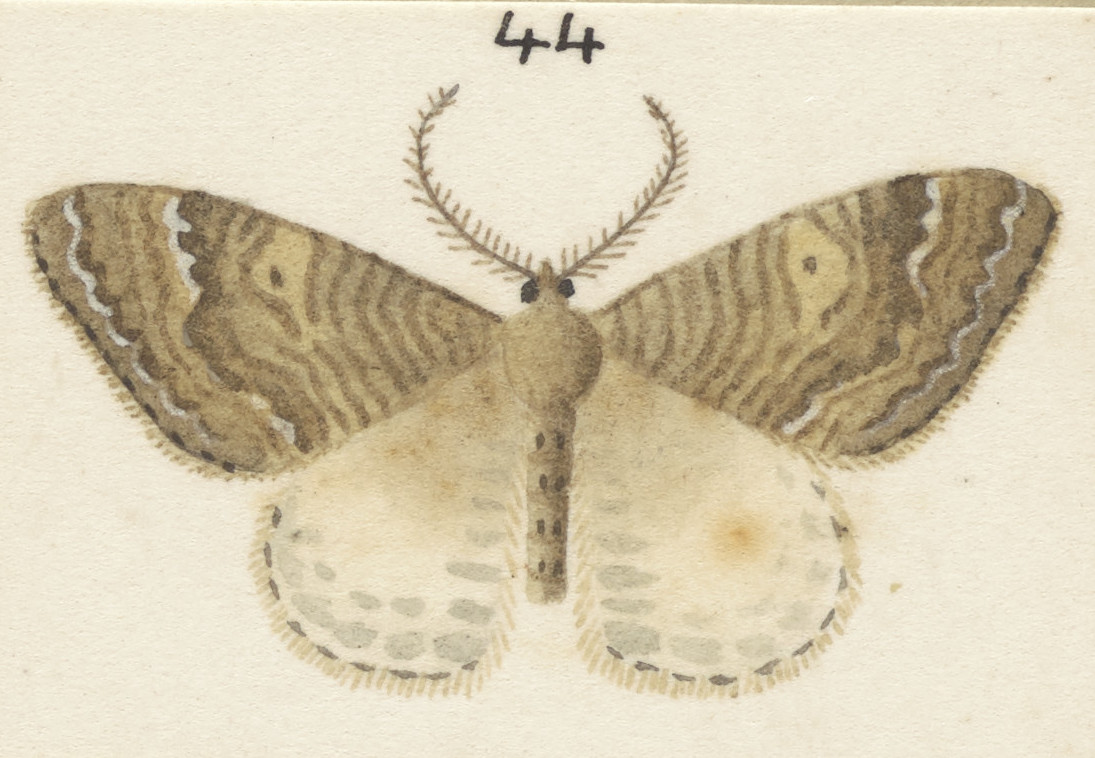
Illustration of female A. chionogramma.

Hudson described the species as follows:

The expansion of the wings is about 1 1/8 inches. The fore-wings are rather dark greyish-brown; there are numerous indistinct wavy paler and darker transverse lines near the base; a rather broad transverse brown band towards the middle, shaded towards the base, and edged with an interrupted jagged white line towards the termen; beyond this there are several broken darker and paler lines. The hind-wings are very pale greyish-ochreous, clouded with grey near the base, and with several rows of small cloudy grey spots near the termen. The female is paler than the male and the markings are less distinct.

== Distribution ==
Asaphodes chionogramma is endemic to New Zealand. This species can be found in the North and South Islands. Specimens of this species have been collected in the mid Canterbury. Meyrick collected this species at Mount Hutt and Hudson stated the species had been collected in the North Island at Mount Taranaki and also occurred at Mount Arthur and Mount Hutt.

== Behaviour ==
The adults of this species is on the wing in December and January.

== Habitat ==
The habitat of this species is on the lower slopes of mountains in wooded valleys at altitudes of between 2000 and 3000 ft.
