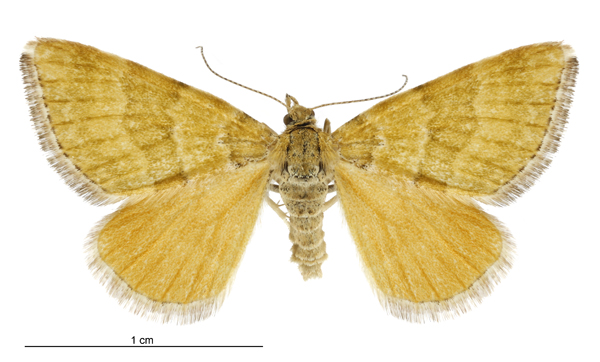
- Female
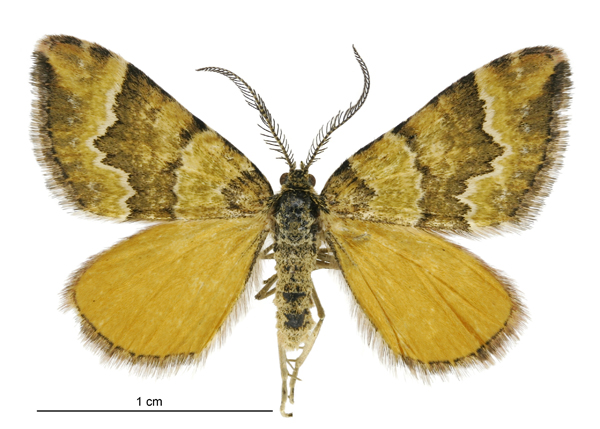
- Male

Scientific classification
- Kingdom: Animalia
- Phylum: Arthropoda
- Clade: Pancrustacea
- Class: Insecta
- Order: Lepidoptera
- Family: Geometridae
- Genus: Asaphodes
- Species: A. cinnabari

Binomial name
- Asaphodes cinnabari (Howes, 1912)

Synonyms
- Larentia cinnabari Howes, 1912; Xanthorhoe cinnabari (Howes, 1912); Xanthorhoe cinnabaris (Howes, 1912); Xanthorhoe cinnabari obsoleta Prout, 1939

= Asaphodes cinnabari =

Species of moth endemic to New Zealand

Asaphodes cinnabari is a species of moth in the family Geometridae. This species is endemic to New Zealand and can be found in Otago and Southland where it lives in alpine swampy habitat. Adults of this species are on the wing in November.

== Taxonomy ==
This species was described by George Howes in 1912 as Larentia cinnabari using specimens collected by himself in the Garvie Mountains and at the Cinnabar Gold Company's claim in Central Otago. The species was originally discovered by his brother A. A. Howes at the Garvie Mountains. George Hudson discussed and illustrated this species under the name Xanthorhoe cinnabaris in his 1928 book The Butterflies and Moths of New Zealand. L. B. Prout proposed the subspecies Asaphodes cinnabari obsoleta, however this was synonymised by John S. Dugdale in 1988. In 1971 Dugdale assigned this species, called by him Xanthorhoe cinnabaris, to the genus Asaphodes. In 1988 Dugdale used the original description epithet cinnabari in his annotated catalogue of New Zealand Lepidoptera but confirmed his placement of this species into the genus Asaphodes. The holotype, collected at Nevis, is held at the Natural History Museum, London.

== Description ==
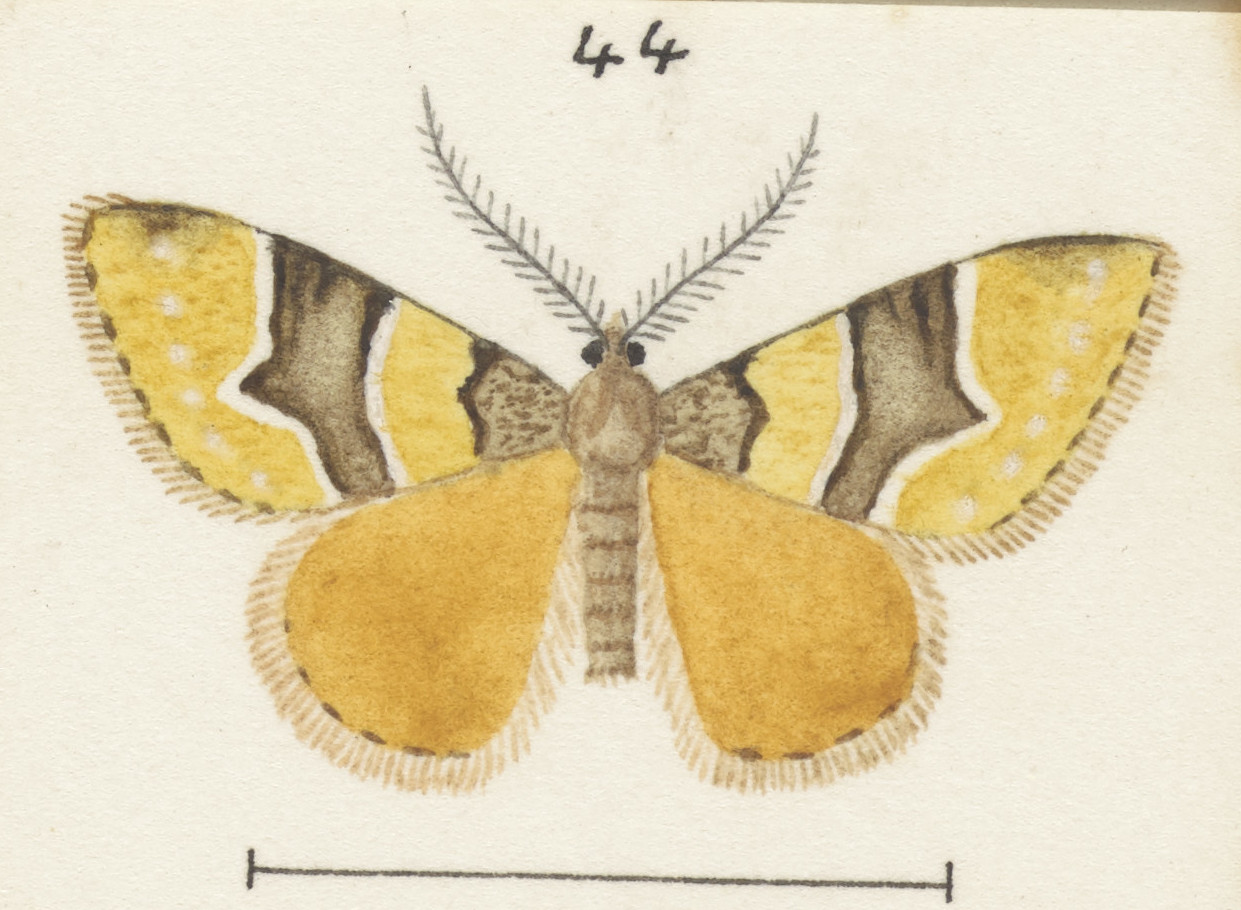
A. cinnabari illustrated by George Hudson.

Howes described the species as follows:

Expanse — in ♂︎, 20 mm. ; in ♀︎, 22 mm. Forewings pale orange, marked with brown and light ochre. Basal area brown, extending to about 1/6, where it is edged with a dark line, then a pale-ochreous thin line, which is followed by pale orange to 1/3. A dark-brown area from about 1/3 to 2/3, edged on both sides with a pale-ochre line. This brown area is bent out towards termen at centre of wing, and slightly constricted below. Subterminal line appears as dark shading on costa, and very faintly below. An oblique shaded patch below apex. With the exception of these markings, from 2/3 to termen is pale orange. There is a terminal series of small dark dots. Cilia purplish-brown, darker at base. Hind-wings uniform orange, with slight dark dots along termen. Cilia purplish-brown. In the female, the markings are the same as in the male but the moth is paler. Considerable variation in depth of colouring and extent of the dark markings showed in the specimens taken.

== Distribution ==
This species is endemic to New Zealand. This species is found in Otago and Southland. Along with the type locality, this species has also been collected in locations such as at the Cinnabar Gold Company claim, Greenstone Valley, and Gorge Hill in Mossburn. Hudson regarded this as a rare species.

== Biology and life cycle ==
The adults of this species is on the wing in November.

== Host plants and habitat ==
The species is an alpine moth and has been collected amongst tussock in swampy habitat. A. cinnabari has been reared in captivity on Hypochaeris radicata.

== Threats ==
The draining and destruction of the swampland habitat this species relies on has led to a decrease in the population of this species in Southland.
