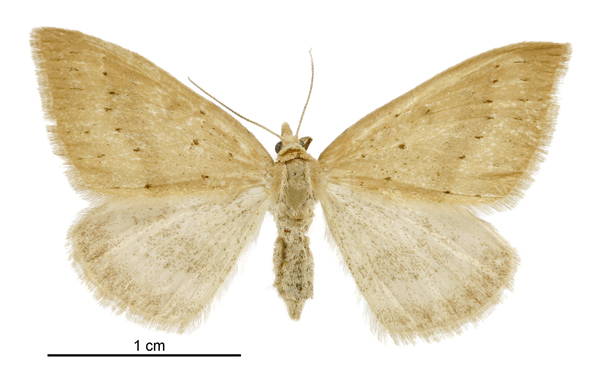
- female
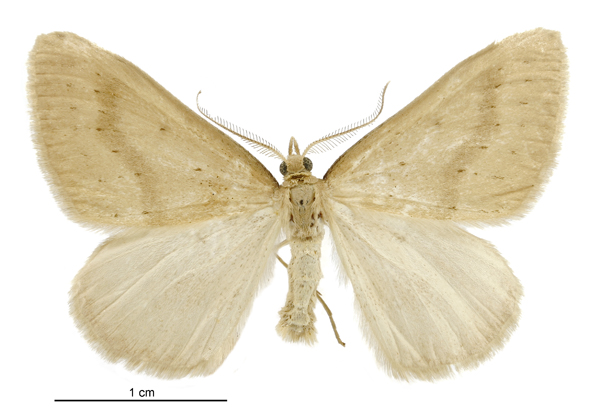
- male

Conservation status
- Data Deficit (NZ TCS)

Scientific classification
- Kingdom: Animalia
- Phylum: Arthropoda
- Clade: Pancrustacea
- Class: Insecta
- Order: Lepidoptera
- Family: Geometridae
- Genus: Asaphodes
- Species: A. mnesichola

Binomial name
- Asaphodes mnesichola (Meyrick, 1888)

Synonyms
- Larentia mnesichola Meyrick, 1888; Xanthorhoe mnesichola (Meyrick, 1888)

= Asaphodes mnesichola =

Species of moth

Asaphodes mnesichola is a species of moth in the family Geometridae. This species was first described by Edward Meyrick in 1888. It is endemic to New Zealand and has been observed in the South Island. This species inhabits subalpine native scrub. Adults of this species are on the wing in January and February. A. mnesichola was classified by the New Zealand Department of Conservation as "data deficient" under the New Zealand Threat Classification System.

== Taxonomy ==
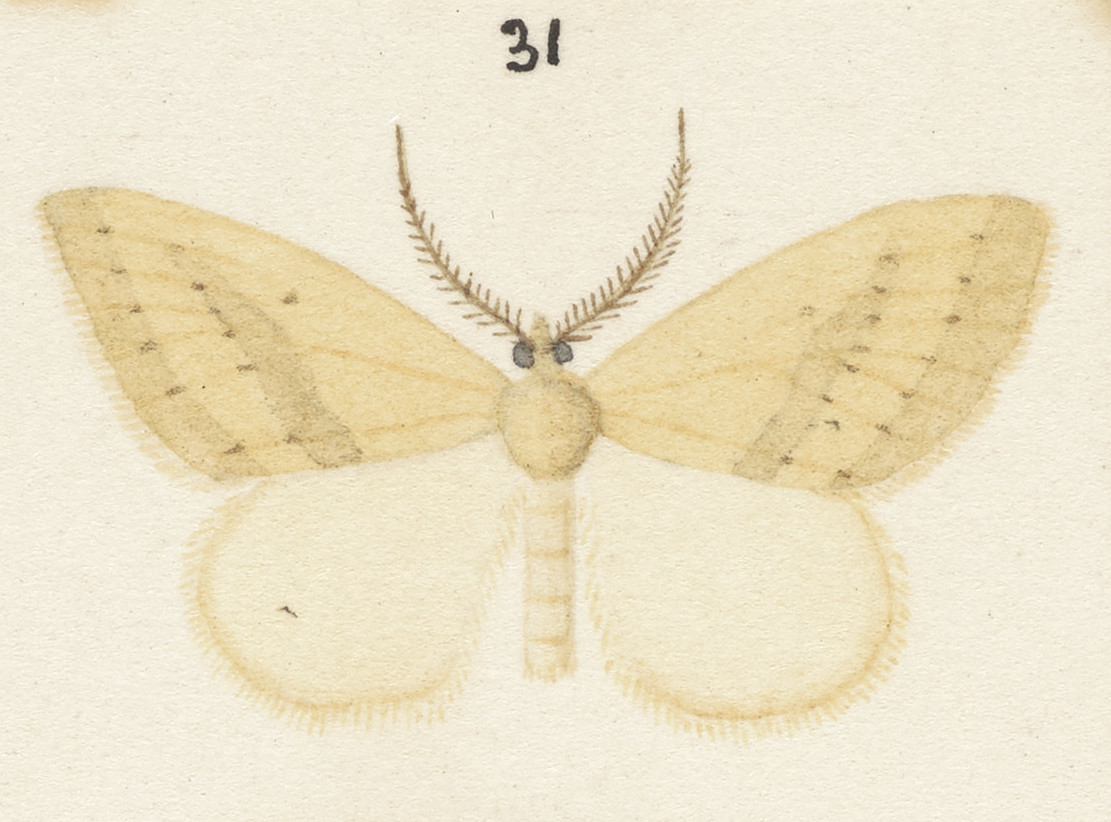
Illustration of male A. mnesichola by George Hudson.

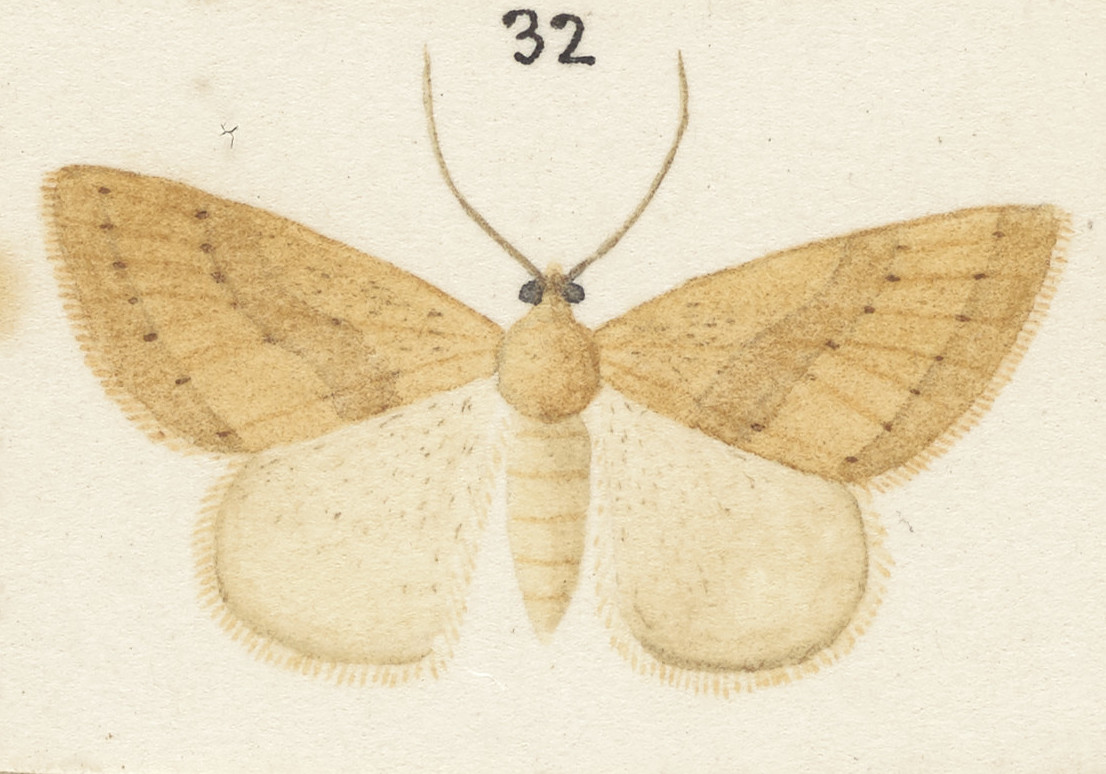
Illustration of female A. mnesichola by George Hudson.

This species was first described by Edward Meyrick in 1888 as Larentia mnesichola using material collected by Meyrick at Mount Arthur. Hudson discussed and illustrated this species in 1898 as Xanthorhoe mnesichola. He also discussed and illustrated this moth under this same name in his 1928 book The Butterflies and Moths of New Zealand. In 1971 John S. Dugdale placed this species within the genus Asaphodes. This placement was confirmed by Dugdale in 1988. The lectotype specimen is held at the Natural History Museum, London.

== Description ==
Meyrick described this species as follows:

Male, female. — 28-30 mm. Head, palpi, antennae, and thorax very pale brownish-ochreous. Abdomen ochreous-grey-whitish. Legs whitish-ocbreous, anterior femora and tibiae dark fuscous above. Forewings with costa gently arched, posteriorly more strongly, hindmargin slightly bowed, rather oblique; very pale glossy brownish-ochreous; four series of minute black dots on veins; first near base; second at 1/3, curved; third from 3/4 of costa to 2/3 of inner margin, rather prominent in middle, preceded by a cloudy fascia slightly darker than ground-colour; fourth subterminal; a minute black discal dot; hindmarginal space sometimes slightly darker : cilia whitish-ochreous, tips paler. Hindwings ochreous-grey-whitish; a cloudy indistinct pale fuscous hindmarginal fascia, containing a dentate subterminal line of ground-colour; cilia pale whitish-ochreous.

== Distribution ==
This species is endemic to New Zealand and has been observed in the South Island.

== Habitat ==
This species inhabits subalpine scrub.

== Behaviour ==
The adults of this species are on the wing in January and February.

== Conservation status ==
In 2025 this species was classified by the New Zealand Department of Conservation as "data deficient" under the New Zealand Threat Classification System.
