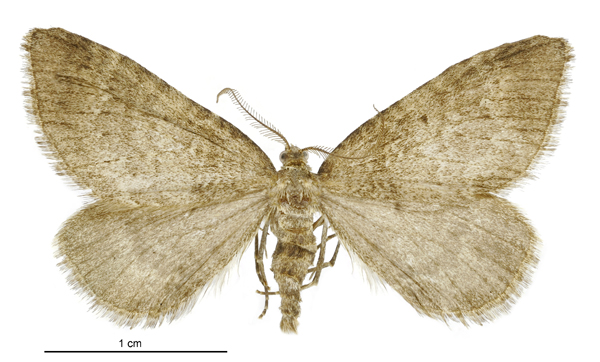
- Male

Scientific classification
- Kingdom: Animalia
- Phylum: Arthropoda
- Clade: Pancrustacea
- Class: Insecta
- Order: Lepidoptera
- Family: Geometridae
- Genus: Asaphodes
- Species: A. periphaea

Binomial name
- Asaphodes periphaea (Meyrick, 1905)

Synonyms
- Xanthorhoe periphaea Meyrick, 1905; Asaphodes peripheraea (Meyrick, 1905)

= Asaphodes periphaea =

Species of moth

Asaphodes periphaea is a moth in the family Geometridae. It is endemic to New Zealand and has only been collected in the mountains near Lake Wakatipu in the South Island. The male is fuscous coloured sprinkled with whitish colouration. The female is brachypterous. The preferred habitat of this species are alpine bluffs as well as mountainous open country. This species is on the wing from January to March.

== Taxonomy ==
This species was first described by Edward Meyrick in 1905 using a specimen collected by George Hudson at Humboldt Range, Lake Wakatipu at 4000 ft and named Xanthorhoe periphaea. In 1928 George Hudson discussed and illustrated this species under the name Xanthorhoe periphaea. In 1939 Louis Beethoven Prout placed this species in the genus Larentia. This placement was not accepted by New Zealand taxonomists. In 1971 J. S. Dugdale placed this species within the genus Asaphodes under the name Asaphodes perpheraea. In 1988 J. S. Dugdale confirmed this placement but perpetuated the error in the species name by using Asaphodes perpheraea when discussing this species. The male holotype specimen is held at the Natural History Museum, London.

== Description ==
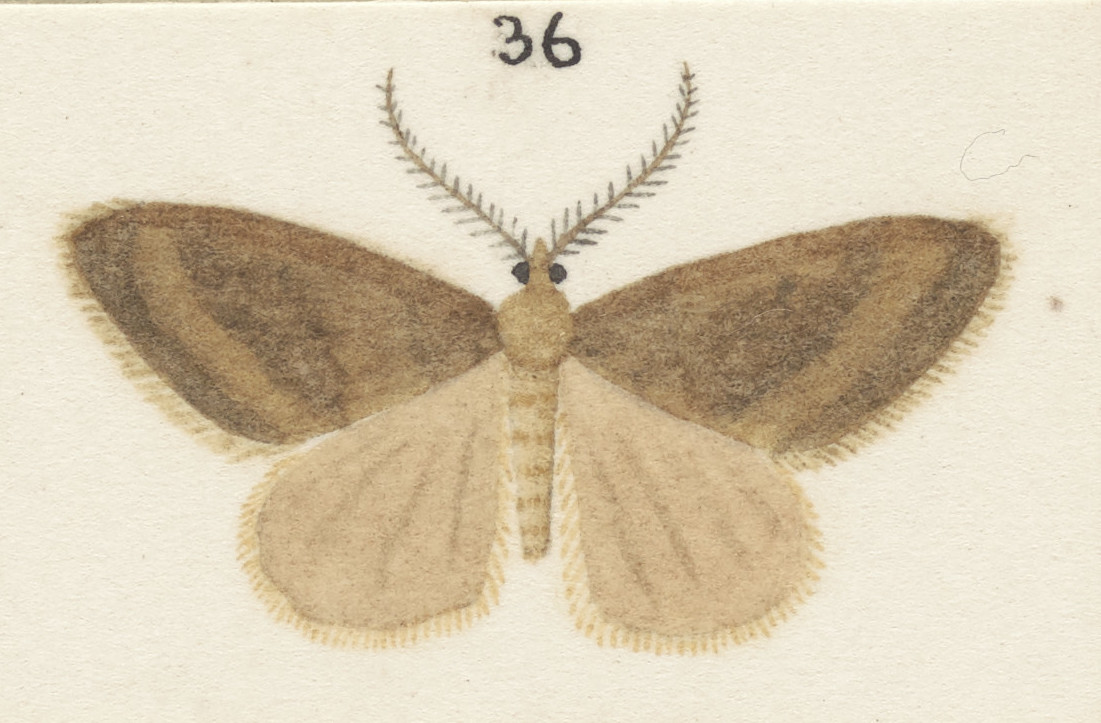
Illustration of male A. periphaea by George Hudson.

Meyrick first described this species as follows:

♂ . 26 mm. Head, thorax, and abdomen fuscous sprinkled with whitish. Fore-wings triangular, termen slightly bowed, oblique; light fuscous, sprinkled with darker fuscous and whitish; two very obscurely darker fasciae indicating median band, first curved, preceded by several white dots, second irregularly curved outwards on upper 3/5, followed by a series of white dots; some whitish dots indicating subterminal line, edged with obscure darker shades : cilia fuscous-whitish, with two fuscous lines. Hind-wings rather elongate, light fuscous; cilia as in fore-wings.

The female of this species is brachypterous and was first collected in January 1987.

== Distribution ==
This species is endemic to New Zealand. A. periphaea has only been collected in the mountains in the north, west and south of Lake Wakatipu. In January 1897 this species as found at Slate Basin and Jane Peak in Otago.

== Habitat ==
The preferred habitat of this species is alpine bluffs as well as mountainous open country.

== Behaviour ==
This species is on the wing from January to March.
