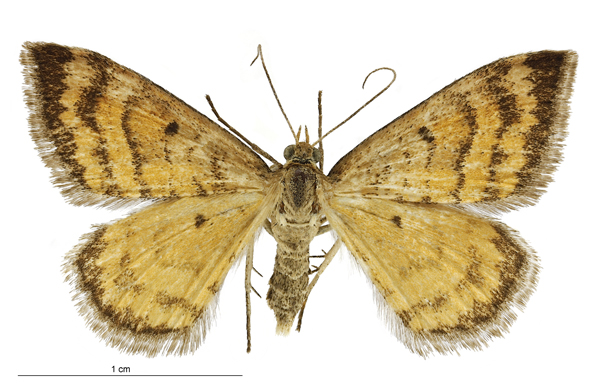
- Female of Asaphodes abrogata, type species of Asaphodes.

Scientific classification
- Kingdom: Animalia
- Phylum: Arthropoda
- Class: Insecta
- Order: Lepidoptera
- Family: Geometridae
- Subfamily: Larentiinae
- Genus: Asaphodes; Meyrick 1885

Synonyms
- Thyone Meyrick, 1883; Xanthorhoe (non Huebner, 1825) Meyrick, 1917

= Asaphodes =

Genus of moths

Asaphodes is a genus of moths in the family Geometridae erected by Edward Meyrick in 1885. This genus is endemic to New Zealand and species within this genus are found throughout New Zealand including the North, South and Stewart / Rakiura Islands.

== Taxonomy ==
This genus was first described by Edward Meyrick in 1885 as a replacement name for the genus Thyone. Meyrick gave more detail in 1886 as well as in 1892. This genus was reinterpreted by John S. Dugdale in 1971. Dugdale stated that the species within this genus

are distinguished from other genera by their possession of a rudimentary calcar (often a pair of contiguous hairy knobs), of a smooth, unscobinate saccular appendage, a deflexed, strongly sclerotised, sharp aedeagus apex in the ♂, and in the ♀ by the ductus bursae being not longer than wide, and containing the internally prolonged and fused ostiolar lamellae. The corpus bursae is reflexed dorsad of the ductus bursae. As in Helastia species, the ductus seminalis arises on the corpus bursae by the corpus/ductus bursae junction.

The type species of this genus is Asaphodes abrogata, by original monotypy.

== Description ==
Meyrick described this genus as follows:

Face with tuft or hardly projecting scales. Palpi moderate, porrected, rough-scaled. Antennae in ♂ bipectinated, apex simple. Thorax glabrous beneath. Posterior tibiae with all spurs present. Fore wings with areole simple. Hind wings with 8 anastomosing with cell from near base to beyond middle.

== Distribution ==
This genus is endemic to New Zealand and species within this genus are found throughout New Zealand including in the North, South and Stewart Island / Rakiura Islands.

== Species ==
The species found in the genus Asaphodes include:

- Asaphodes abrogata (Walker 1862)
- Asaphodes adonis (Hudson, 1898)
- Asaphodes aegrota (Butler, 1879)
- Asaphodes albalineata (Philpott, 1915)
- Asaphodes aphelias (Prout, 1939)
- Asaphodes beata (Butler, 1877)
- Asaphodes camelias (Meyrick, 1888)
- Asaphodes campbellensis (Dugdale, 1964)
- Asaphodes cataphracta (Meyrick, 1883)
- Asaphodes chionogramma (Meyrick, 1883)
- Asaphodes chlamydota (Meyrick, 1883)
- Asaphodes chlorocapna (Meyrick, 1925)
- Asaphodes cinnabari (Howes, 1912)
- Asaphodes citroena (Clarke, 1934)
- Asaphodes clarata (Walker, 1862)
- Asaphodes cosmodora (Meyrick, 1888)
- Asaphodes declarata (Prout, 1914)
- Asaphodes dionysias (Meyrick, 1907)
- Asaphodes exoriens (Prout, 1912)
- Asaphodes frivola (Meyrick, 1913)
- Asaphodes glaciata (Hudson, 1925)
- Asaphodes helias (Meyrick, 1883)
- Asaphodes ida (Clarke, 1926)
- Asaphodes imperfecta (Philpott, 1905)
- Asaphodes limonodes (Meyrick, 1888)
- Asaphodes mnesichola (Meyrick, 1888)
- Asaphodes nephelias (Meyrick, 1883)
- Asaphodes obarata (Felder & Rogenhofer, 1875)
- Asaphodes omichlias (Meyrick, 1883)
- Asaphodes oraria (Philpott, 1903)
- Asaphodes oxyptera (Hudson, 1909)
- Asaphodes periphaea (Meyrick, 1905)
- Asaphodes philpotti (Prout, 1927)
- Asaphodes prasinias (Meyrick, 1883)
- Asaphodes prymnaea (Meyrick, 1911)
- Asaphodes recta (Philpott, 1905)
- Asaphodes sericodes (Meyrick, 1915)
- Asaphodes stephanitis Meyrick, 1907
- Asaphodes stinaria (Guenee, 1868)
