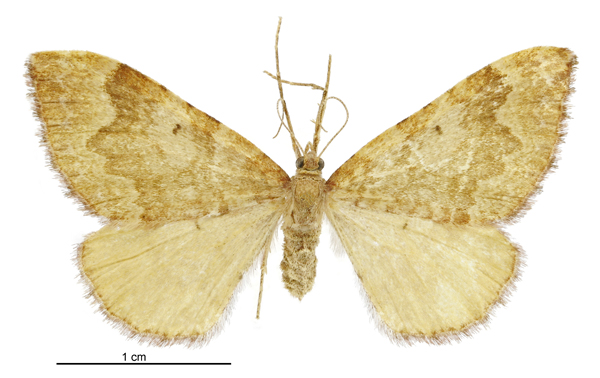
- Female
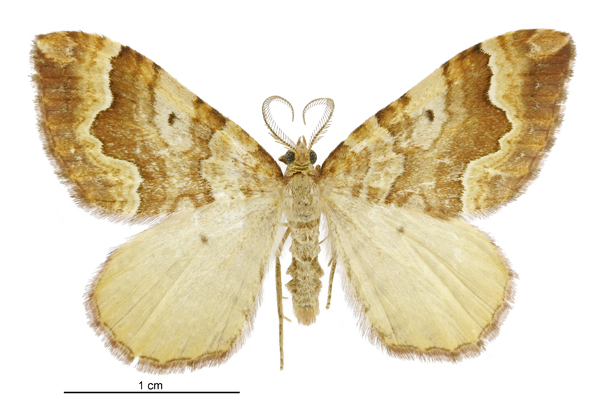
- Male

Scientific classification
- Kingdom: Animalia
- Phylum: Arthropoda
- Clade: Pancrustacea
- Class: Insecta
- Order: Lepidoptera
- Family: Geometridae
- Genus: Asaphodes
- Species: A. prymnaea

Binomial name
- Asaphodes prymnaea (Meyrick, 1911)

Synonyms
- Xanthorhoe prymnaea Meyrick, 1911

= Asaphodes prymnaea =

Species of moth

Asaphodes prymnaea is a moth in the family Geometridae. It is endemic to New Zealand and can be found on the Mount Arthur tableland. It is common in limestone valleys. The female of the species is paler and has less distinctive markings than the male. Adults are on the wing in January and February.

== Taxonomy ==
This species was first described by Edward Meyrick in 1911, using specimens collected by George Hudson in February at the Mount Arthur tableland at altitudes of between 3,600 - 4,200 ft, and named Xanthorhoe prymnaea. George Hudson discussed and illustrated this species under that name in his 1928 publication The butterflies and moths of New Zealand. In 1971 J. S. Dugdale placed this species in the genus Asaphodes. This placement was confirmed by Dugdale in 1988. The male lectotype, collected at Mount Arthur, is held by the Natural History Museum, London.

== Description ==
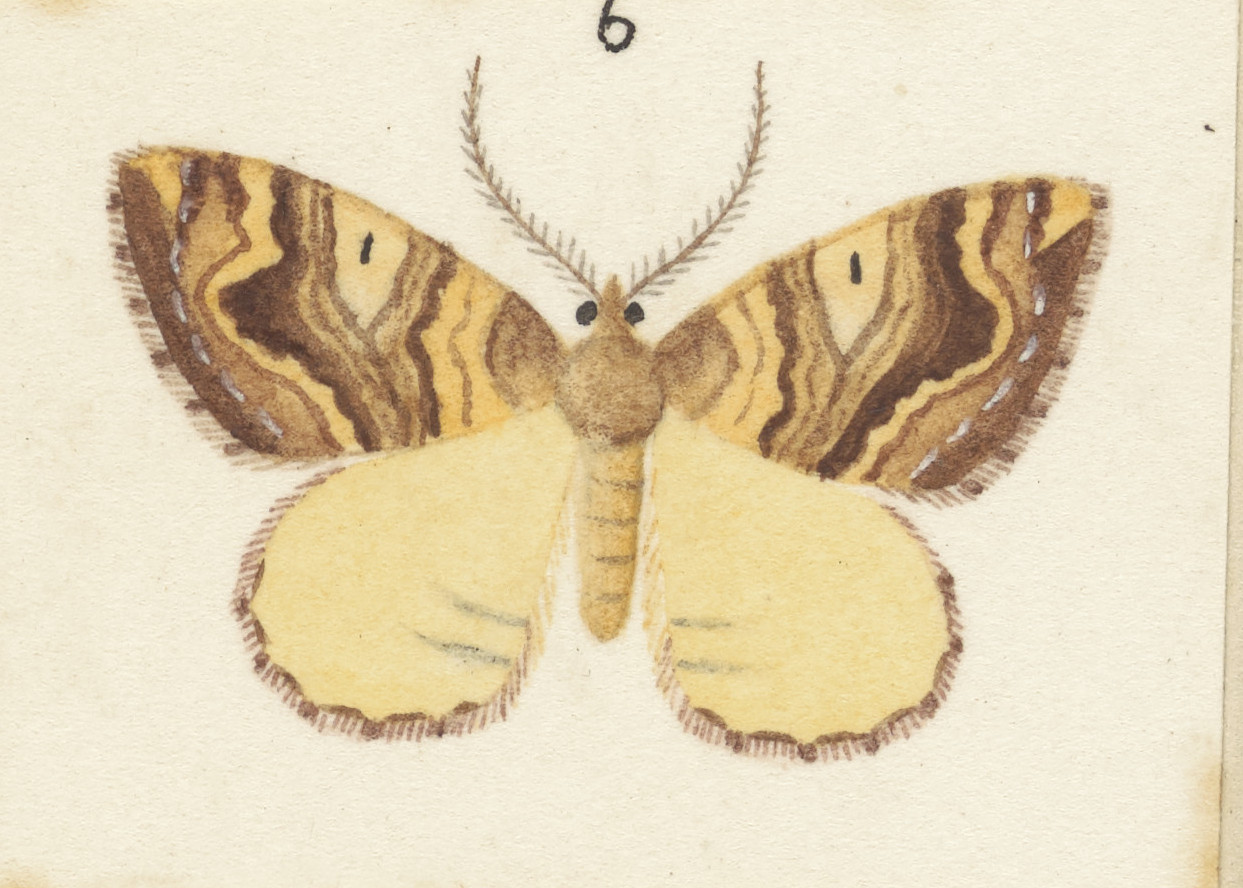
Illustration of male A. prymnaea by George Hudson.

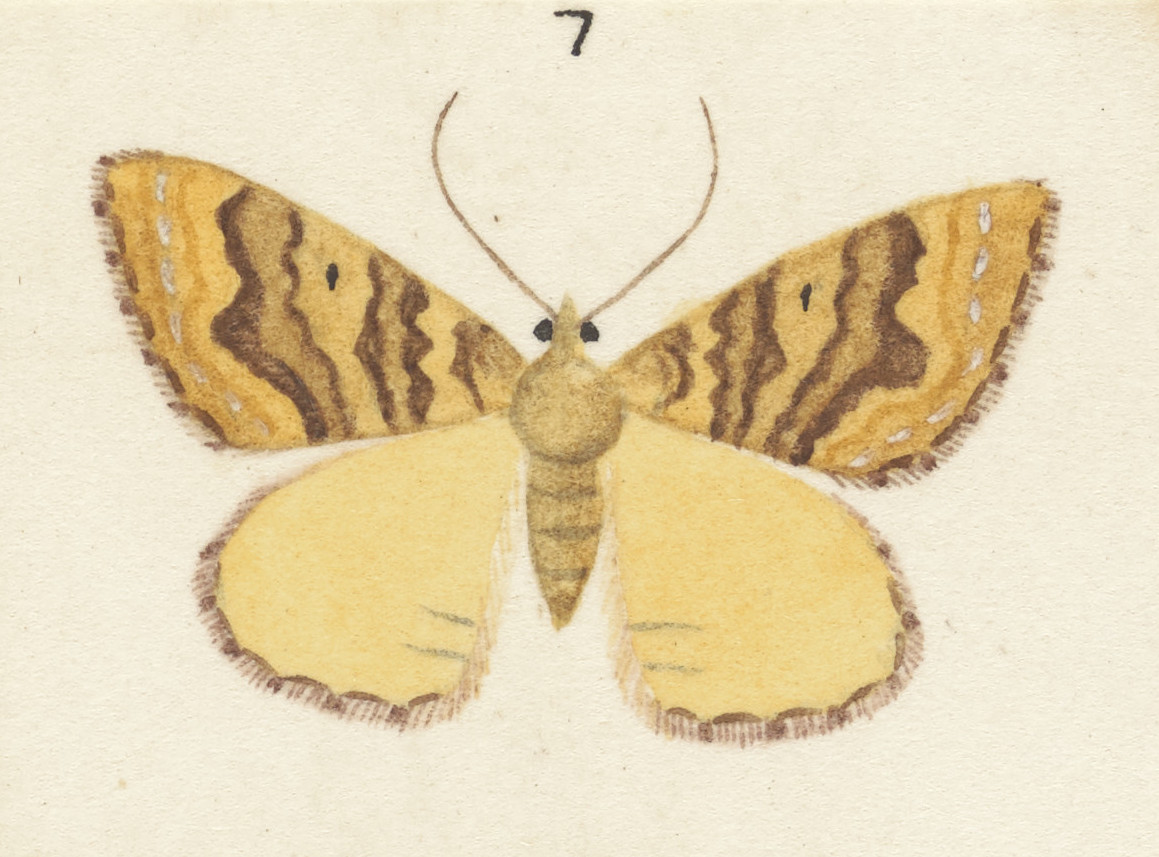
Illustration of female A. prymaea by George Hudson.

Meyrick described this species as follows:

♂♀. 32–35 mm. Head and thorax yellow-ochreous, shoulders mixed with ferruginous and dark fuscous. Antennal pectinations in ♂ a 6, b 4. Abdomen ochreous-yellowish. Forewings triangular, costa posteriorly moderately arched, apex obtuse, termen waved, rounded, oblique; ochreous-yellow; a small basal patch formed by three or four more or less marked strongly curved red-brown striae, marked with black on costa; median band enclosed by fasciae formed of one inner and two confluent outer rather waved dark red-brown striae marked with black on costa and on edges of band, sometimes connected below middle, anterior fascia narrow, somewhat irregularly curved, posterior moderately broad, dark and strongly marked posteriorly and somewhat edged with whitish suffusion, median third forming a broad obtuse double prominence, these fasciae in ♀ little marked except on edges of band; a black discal dot between these fasciae, space round it somewhat whitish-tinged; terminal area more or less tinged or striated with red-brown, including a slender waved white subterminal line edged anteriorly with fuscous suffusion, with an oblique subapical patch of dark suffusion: cilia crimson-fuscous, outer half barred with dark fuscous alternating with paler suffusion. Hindwings with termen rounded; ochreous-yellow; a small linear dark-grey discal dot; traces of two or three short grey strigae on dorsum; a fine dark-fuscous terminal line: cilia crimson-grey, indistinctly darker-barred.

The female has paler and less distinctive markings.

== Distribution ==
This species is endemic to New Zealand and can be found in the Mount Arthur tableland.

== Habitat ==
This species is said to be common in limestone valleys.

== Behaviour ==
Adults of this species are on the wing in January and February.
