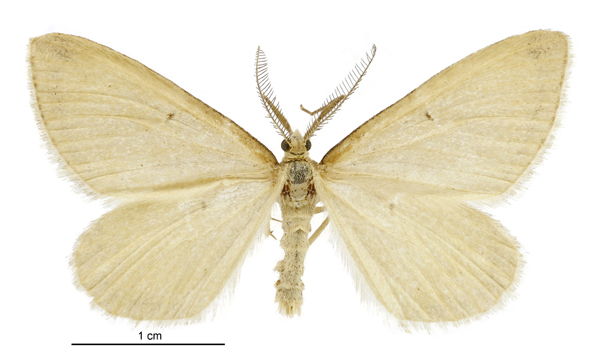
- Male

Scientific classification
- Kingdom: Animalia
- Phylum: Arthropoda
- Clade: Pancrustacea
- Class: Insecta
- Order: Lepidoptera
- Family: Geometridae
- Genus: Asaphodes
- Species: A. sericodes

Binomial name
- Asaphodes sericodes (Meyrick, 1915)

Synonyms
- Xanthorhoe sericodes Meyrick, 1915; Larentia sericodes (Meyrick, 1915)

= Asaphodes sericodes =

Species of moth

Asaphodes sericodes is a moth in the family Geometridae. It is endemic to New Zealand and has been observed in the southern parts of the South Island. This species inhabits open tussock grasslands in subalpine scrub or wetlands. The female of the species is likely semi-apterous and is flightless. The adult males are on the wing in January.

== Taxonomy ==
This species was first described by Edward Meyrick in 1915, using specimens collected by George Hudson at Mount Earnslaw at 4000 ft in January, and named Xanthorhoe sericodes. George Hudson discussed and illustrated this species under that name in 1928. In 1939 Louis Beethoven Prout placed this species in the genus Larentia. This placement was not accepted by New Zealand taxonomists. In 1971 J. S. Dugdale placed this species in the genus Asaphodes. In 1988 Dugdale confirmed this placement. The male lectotype specimen, collected at Mount Earnslaw, is held at the Natural History Museum, London.

== Description ==
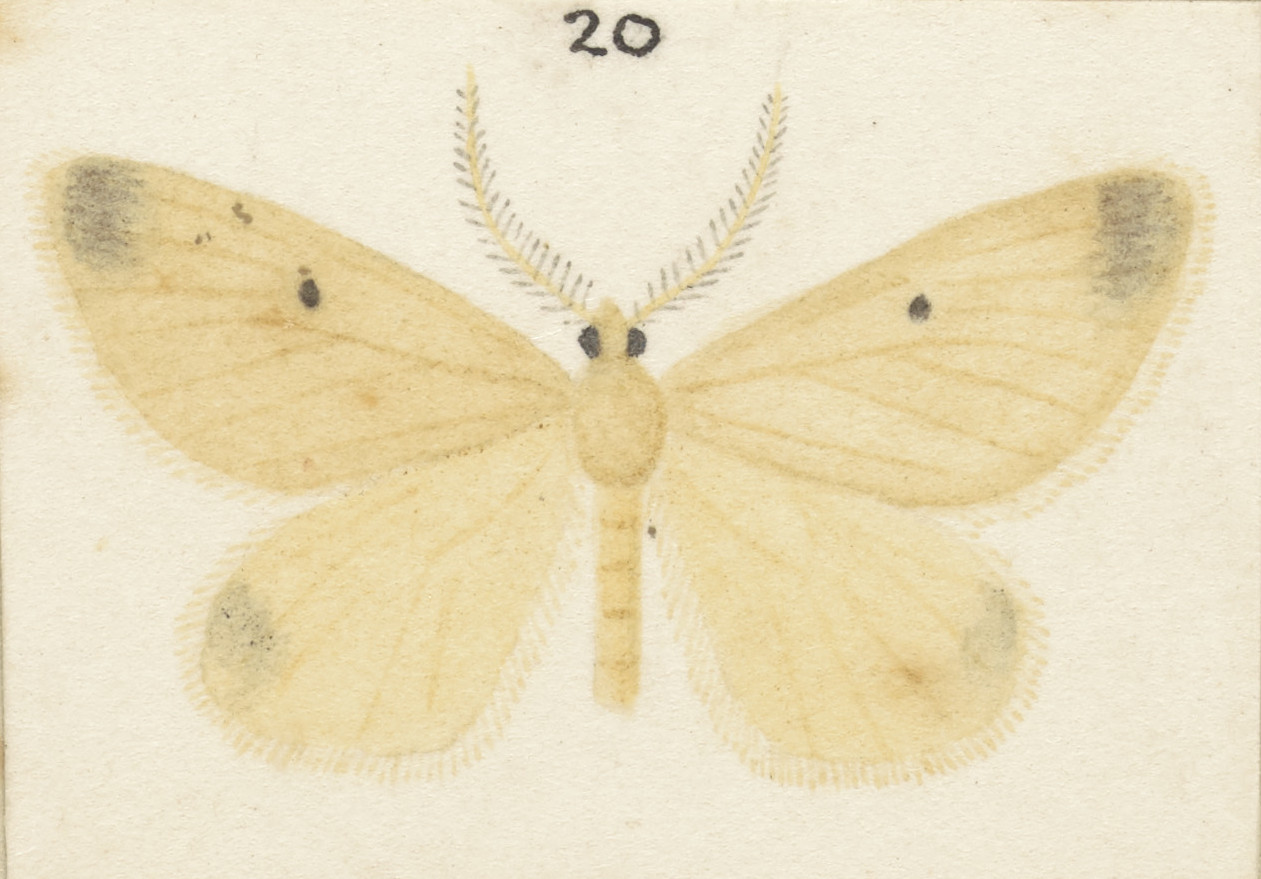
Illustration of male A. sericodes by George Hudson.

Meyrick described this species as follows:

♂. 33-34 mm. Head, palpi, and thorax pale greyish-ochreous. Antennal pectinations 6. Abdomen pale, ochreous, sometimes with double dorsal series of small cloudy dark-fuscous dots. Forewings triangular, costa hardly arched, apex obtuse, termen rounded, rather oblique; pale greyish-ochreous; in one specimen a transverse dark-fuscous discal dot, and some faint paired fuscous dots on termen, in the other these are wholly absent: cilia whitish - ochreous. Hind wings and cilia whitish - ochreous tinged with grey; in one specimen a faint grey discal dot.

It is likely that the female of this species is narrow and short winged with long legs and is incapable of flight, as is the case with the close relatives of this species.

== Distribution ==
This species is endemic to New Zealand. Other than the type locality it has also been observed in Symmetry Peaks in the Eyre Mountains.

== Habitat ==
This species inhabits tussock grassland openings in subalpine bush as well as wetland tussock habitat.

== Behaviour ==
Adults of this species is on the wing in January.
