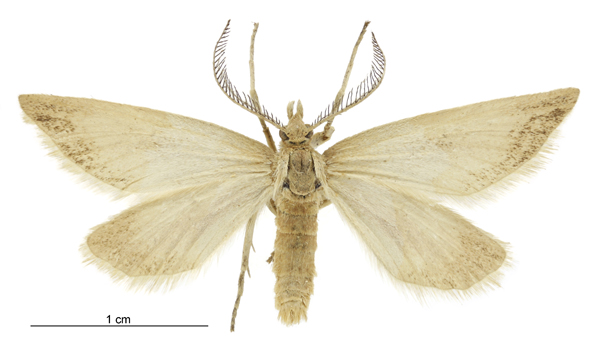
- Male

Scientific classification
- Kingdom: Animalia
- Phylum: Arthropoda
- Clade: Pancrustacea
- Class: Insecta
- Order: Lepidoptera
- Family: Geometridae
- Genus: Asaphodes
- Species: A. campbellensis

Binomial name
- Asaphodes campbellensis (Dugdale, 1964)

Synonyms
- Xanthorhoe campbellensis Dugdale, 1964

= Asaphodes campbellensis =

Species of moth, endemic to Campbell Island of New Zealand

Asaphodes campbellensis is a species of moth in the family Geometridae. It is endemic to Campbell Island in New Zealand.

== Taxonomy ==
This species was described by J. S. Dugdale in 1964 and named Xanthorhoe campbellensis. In 1971 Dugdale placed this species in the genus Asaphodes. This placement was affirmed by Dugdale in 1988. The male holotype specimen, collected at Shoal Point, Campbell Island, is held at the New Zealand Arthropod Collection.

== Description ==
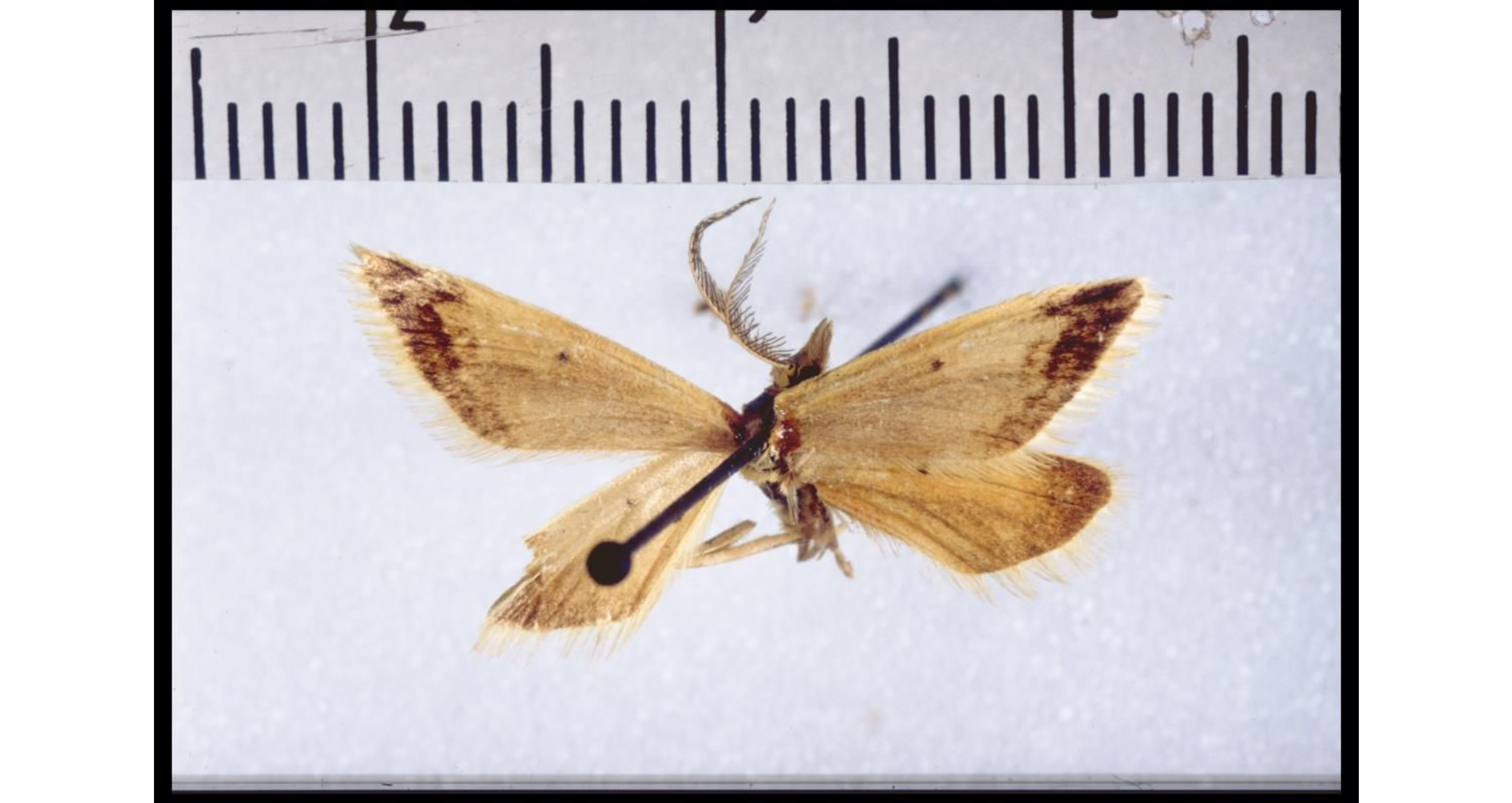
Asaphodes campbellensis male holotype

Dugdale described the species as follows:

X. campbellensis is very variable in the dorsal and ventral wing color patterns, the marginal shade being present or absent, the discal dot varying from strong to obsolete to absent, and the ground color varying from yellow-straw to dark fawn. The ventral discal stripe is also variable on both wings.

== Distribution ==
This species is endemic to New Zealand and is found on Campbell Island.

== Host species ==
The host plant of this species is likely Chionochloa.
