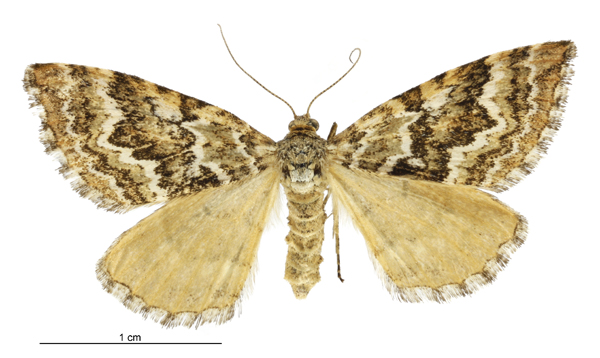
- Female
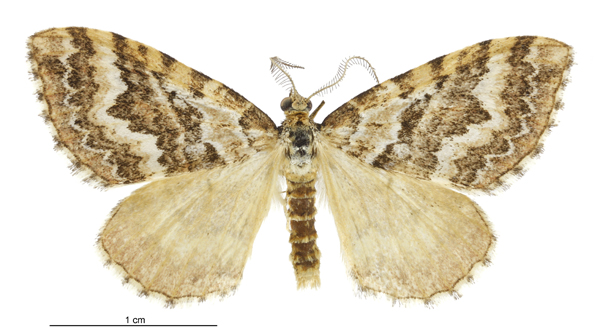
- Male

Scientific classification
- Kingdom: Animalia
- Phylum: Arthropoda
- Clade: Pancrustacea
- Class: Insecta
- Order: Lepidoptera
- Family: Geometridae
- Genus: Asaphodes
- Species: A. stephanitis

Binomial name
- Asaphodes stephanitis Meyrick, 1907

= Asaphodes stephanitis =

Species of moth

Asaphodes stephanitis is a species of moth in the family Geometridae. This species is endemic to New Zealand and has been observed in the southern parts of the South Island. this species inhabits coastal sand hills and grassland and is regarded as being rare. Adults are on the wing from January to March.

== Taxonomy ==
This species was first described by Edward Meyrick in 1907 using specimens collected in Invercargill and named Asaphodes stephanitis. George Hudson discussed and illustrated this species under that name in his 1928 publication The Butterflies and Moths of New Zealand. In 1971 J. S. Dugdale agreed with the placement of this species in the genus Asaphodes. In 1988 J. S. Dugdale again confirmed this placement. The male lectotype specimen, collected at Invercargill, is held at the Natural History Museum, London.

== Description ==
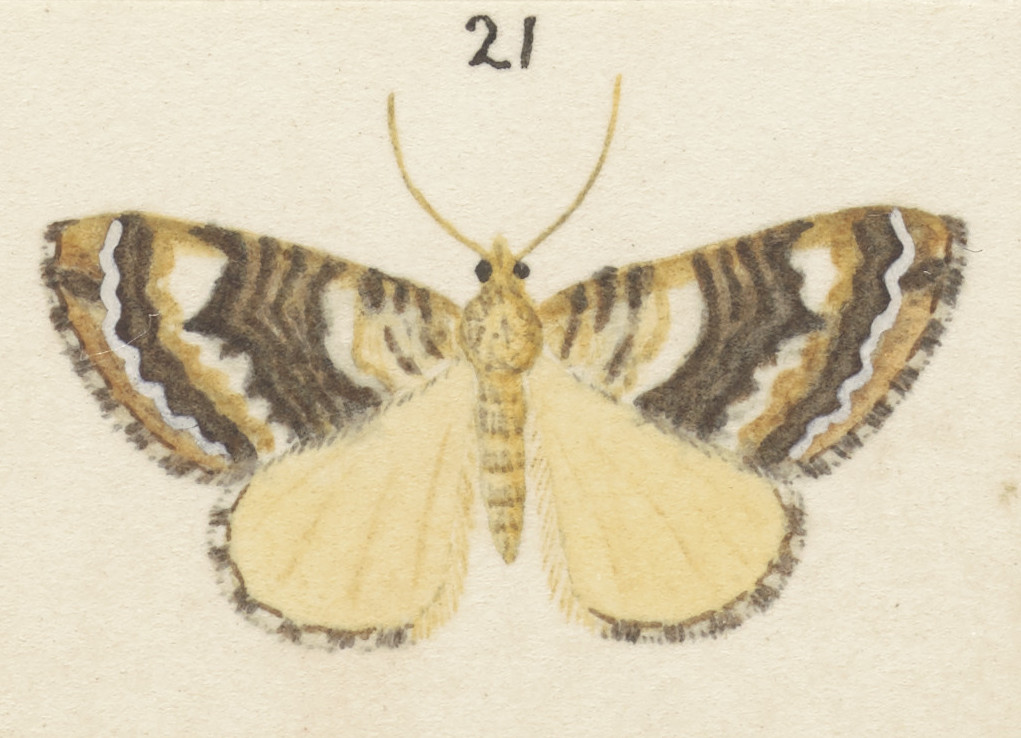
Illustration of male A. stephanitis by George Hudson.

Meyrick described this species as follows:

♂. 26–27 mm. Head and thorax yellow-ochreous, with a few blackish scales. Forewings triangular, costa gently arched, termen bowed, oblique, slightly waved; clear light yellow-ochreous; fasciae formed by dentate striae of blackish irroration, first and second separated by a suffused whitish line, second obsolete except on extremities; third reduced to a single curved stria, preceded by a white line, and followed by white suffusion above and below middle; fourth of three striae, posterior edge with acute short triangular projection in middle, followed by a strong white line; fifth of two striae, posterior sometimes very thick and suffused, followed by white subterminal line, sometimes partially obscured; sixth of one stria following subterminal line, terminated above by an oblique subapical suffusion; a blackish terminal line: cilia white, barred with blackish irroration. Hindwings light ochreous-yellow; terminal line and cilia as in forewings.

== Distribution ==
This species is endemic to New Zealand. This species has been collected at its type locality of Invercargill and at locations near Bluff where this species is regarded as being rare.

== Habitat ==
The preferred habitat of this species is coastal sand hills and grassland.

== Behaviour ==
The adults of this species are on the wing from January until March.
