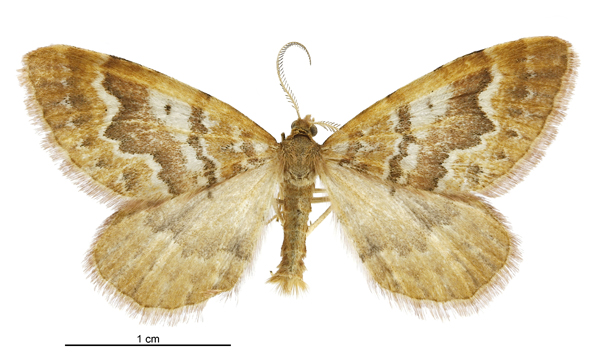
- Male

Scientific classification
- Kingdom: Animalia
- Phylum: Arthropoda
- Clade: Pancrustacea
- Class: Insecta
- Order: Lepidoptera
- Family: Geometridae
- Genus: Asaphodes
- Species: A. exoriens

Binomial name
- Asaphodes exoriens (Prout, 1912)

Synonyms
- Larentia exoriens Prout, 1912; Xanthorhoe exoriens (Prout, 1912)

= Asaphodes exoriens =

Species of moth

Asaphodes exoriens is a species of moth in the family Geometridae. This species is endemic to New Zealand and has been found in Central Otago. This is an alpine species and frequents open grassy habitat. They can also be found in upland wetland habitat at altitudes between 800 and 1100 m. Adults are on the wing in March.

== Taxonomy ==
This species was described by Louis Beethoven Prout in 1912 as Larentia exoriens using material collected by George Howes at Glenorchy in Otago in March. In 1917 Edward Meyrick placed this species in the genus Xanthorhoe. George Hudson discussed and illustrated this species under the name Xanthorhoe exoriens in his 1928 publication The Butterflies and Moths of New Zealand. In 1939 Louis Beethoven Prout placed this species in the genus Larentia. This placement was not accepted by New Zealand taxonomists. In 1971 John S. Dugdale assigned this species to the genus Asaphodes. In 1988 John S. Dugdale confirmed this placement. The male holotype specimen, collected at Glenorchy, is held at the Natural History Museum, London.

== Description ==
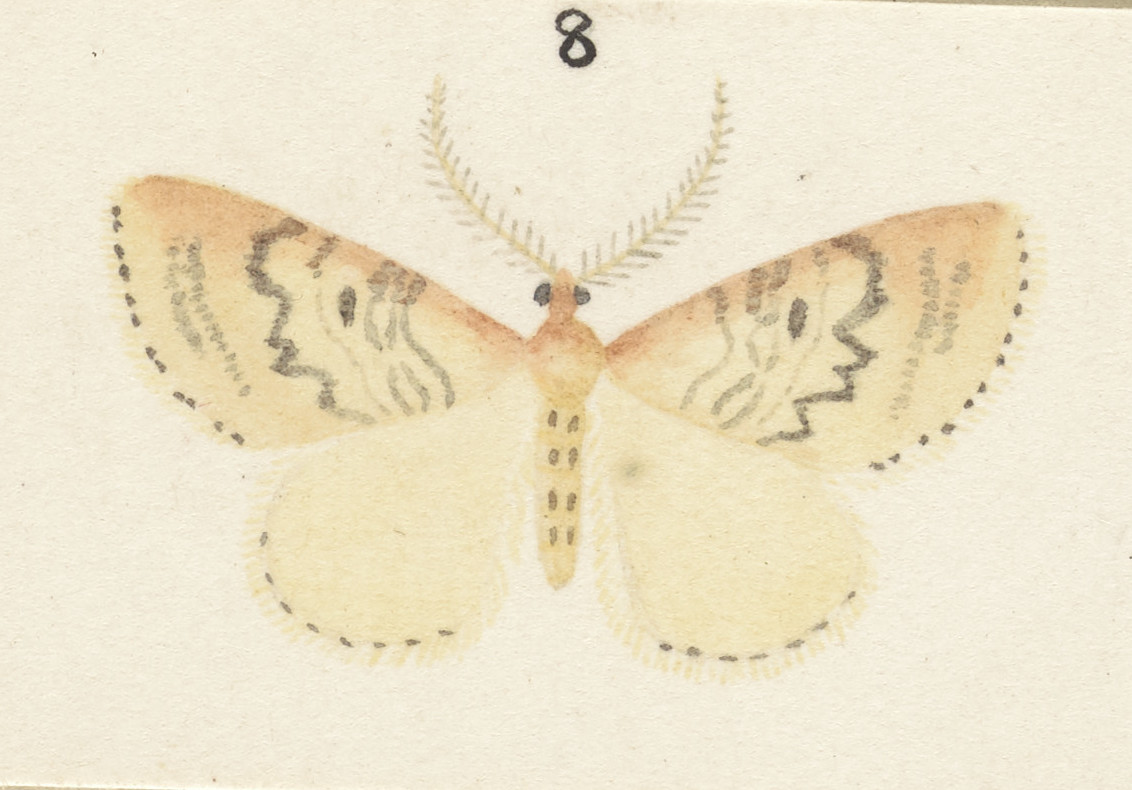
Illustration of A. exoriens by George Hudson.

Hudson described the species as follows:

The expansion of the wings is 1 1/8 inches. All the wings are ochreous, the forewings being strongly tinged with reddish on the costa and extreme base; the median band consists of four very irregular faint blackish lines, the second and third lines forming three distinct loops; there is a distinct blackish discal dot and the outer edge of the median band is very strongly waved, with distinct projections above and below the middle; the subterminal area is broad with one or two very faint cloudy marks; all the wings have a terminal series of minute brown marks, and all the cilia are plain ochreous without bars. The underside of the hind-wings is dull reddish-ochreous without bars. The underside of the hind-wings is dull reddish-ochreous without distinct markings.

== Distribution ==
This species is endemic to New Zealand. It has only been found in Central Otago.

== Biology and life cycle ==
A. exoriens is on the wing in March.

== Habitat and host species ==
A. exoriens is an alpine species that frequents open grassy habitat. The adult moths are found in upland wetland habitat at altitudes of between 800-1100m.
