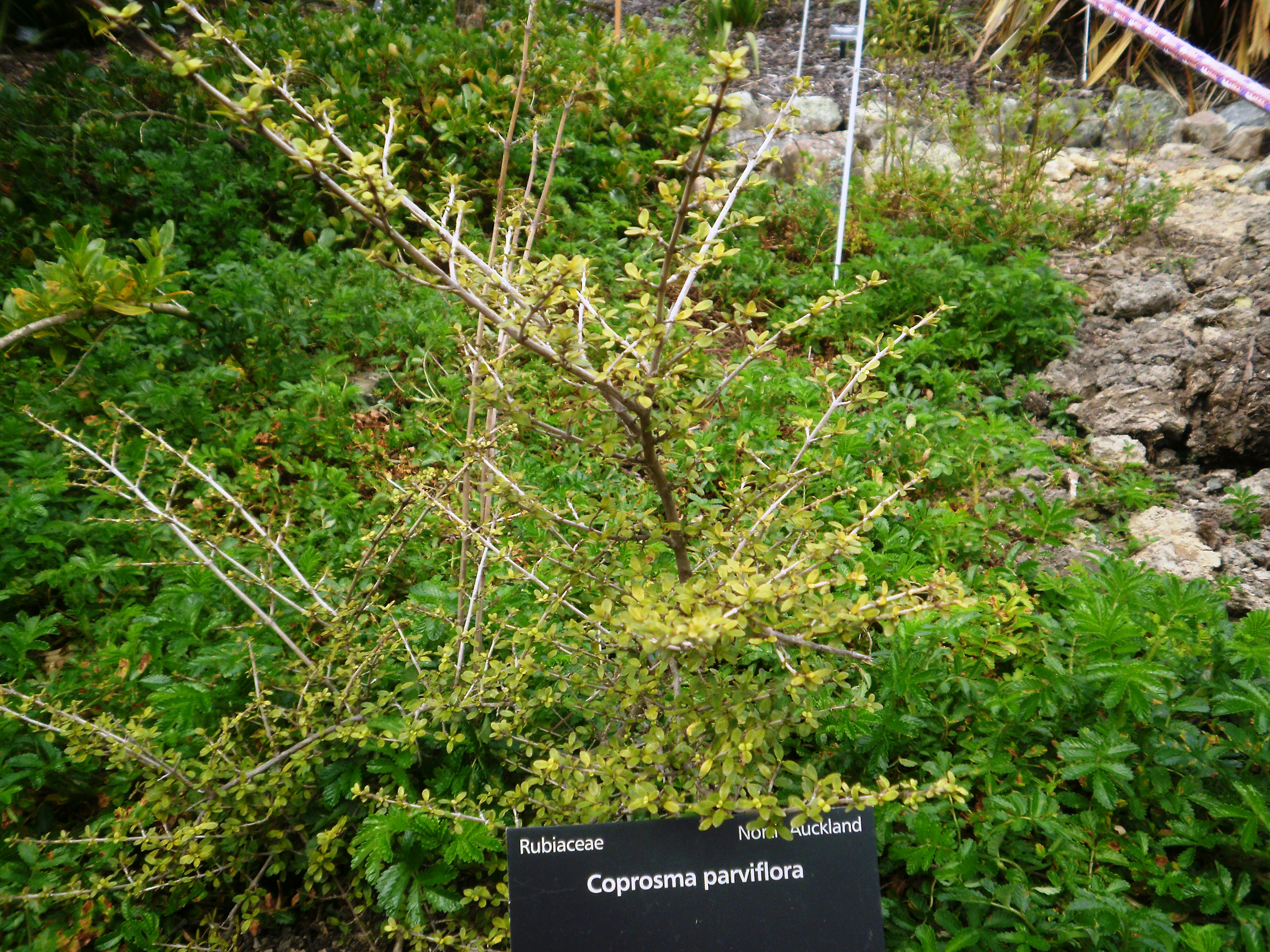

Scientific classification
- Kingdom: Plantae
- Clade: Embryophytes
- Clade: Tracheophytes
- Clade: Spermatophytes
- Clade: Angiosperms
- Clade: Eudicots
- Clade: Asterids
- Order: Gentianales
- Family: Rubiaceae
- Genus: Coprosma
- Species: C. parviflora

Binomial name
- Coprosma parviflora Hook.f.

= Coprosma parviflora =

Species of plant

Coprosma parviflora, also called leafy coprosma, is a shrub that is native to New Zealand. C. parviflora naturally occurs on the Three Kings Islands and in the northern North Island.

== Description ==
It is a small, bushy shrub characterized by flattened, wide-angled branches and twigs that are fuzzy toward the tips. Oval-shaped leaves measuring 7–12 mm long, with tiny hairs underneath. The plants fruit are white-pink or dark-violet.
