= Charles Edwin Clarke =

New Zealand entomologist

- Born: 1885; Dunedin, New Zealand
- Died: September 17, 1952
- Scientific career
- Fields: Entomology

Charles Edwin Clarke (1885 – 17 September 1952) was a New Zealand dentist and amateur entomologist, who specialised in collecting lepidoptera and coleoptera.

== Biography ==
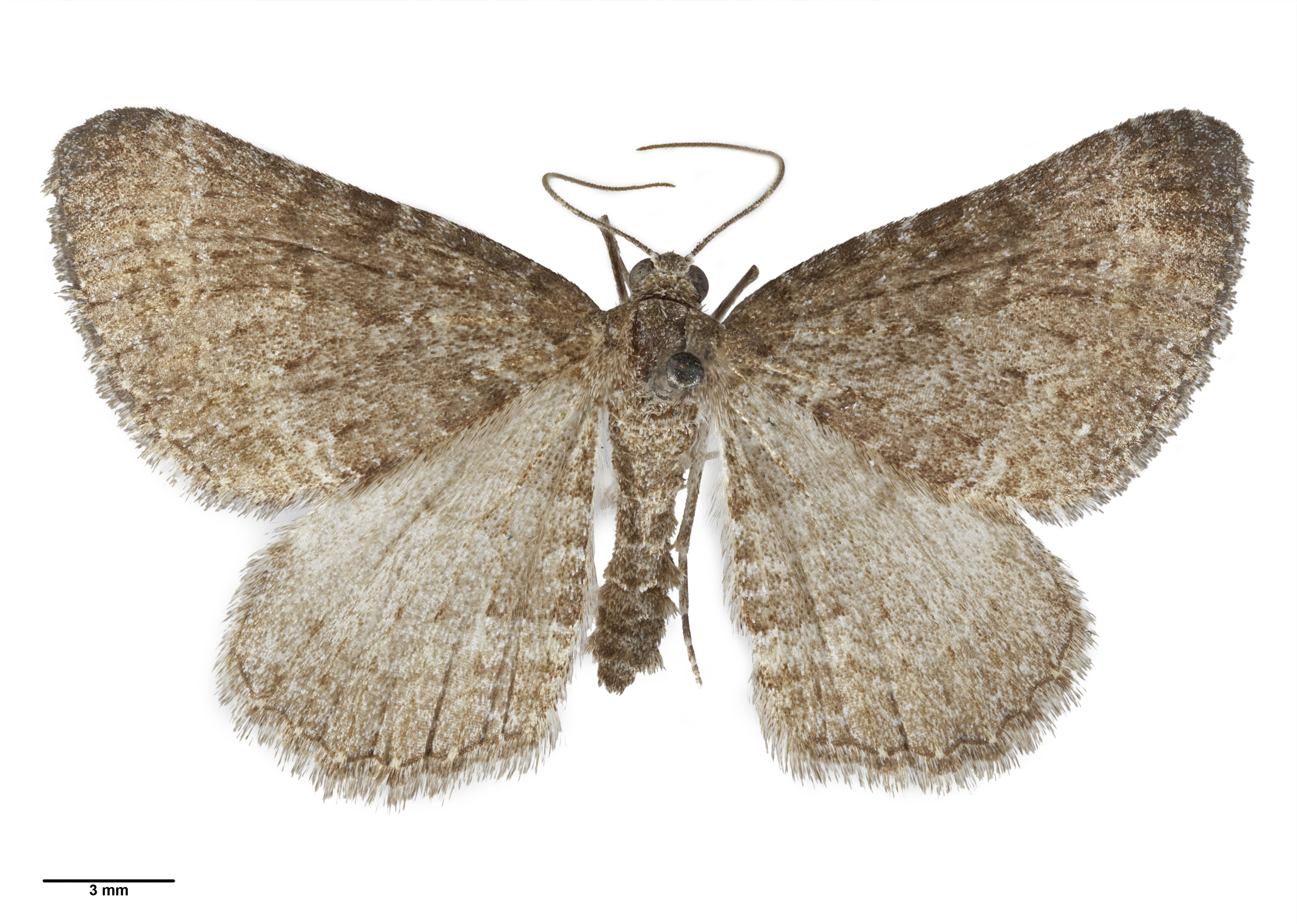
Holotype of Hydriomena clarkei, collected by Clarke from Flagstaff Hill, Dunedin used as the basis for George Howes description of the species in 1915

Clarke was born in 1885. in Dunedin. Clarke worked as a dentist as a profession, and collected specimens as a hobby. Most of Clarke's specimens were collected between the 1910s and 1940s, and Clarke published findings in the Transactions and Proceedings of the Royal Society of New Zealand between 1920 and 1934.

In 1915, a moth specimen collected by Clarke from Flagstaff Hill, Dunedin was used by George Howes to describe the moth species Hydriomena clarkei, which Howes named after Clarke.

Clarke discovered and identified numerous moth species between 1920 and 1936, including Ericodesma cuneata, Heterocrossa sanctimonea and Asterivora urbana. Clarke's specimens were also used by New Zealand entomologists to describe new species, including Edward Meyrick in 1924 describing Atomotricha prospiciens, George Hudson to describe Asaphodes glaciata in 1925, and by entomologist Alfred Philpott, who described Proteodes clarkei in 1926, naming the species after Clarke.

In 1929, Clarke donated much of his insect collection to Auckland War Memorial Museum. Using Clarke's collections, Philpott described numerous moth species, including Archyala culta, Orocrambus clarkei, Paramorpha marginata and Zapyrastra stellata.

Clarke died on 17 September 1952. After his death, Clarke's collection of beetles was acquired by Auckland War Memorial Museum and the British Museum.

Over 5,500 specimens by Clarke are found in the collections of Auckland War Memorial Museum. In addition to these, Clarke's specimens are found in the Otago Museum, Museum of New Zealand Te Papa Tongarewa and the British Museum.

== Personal life ==
Clarke was a close friend of New Zealand coleopterist Ernest Richard Fairburn.

== Taxa named by Clarke ==
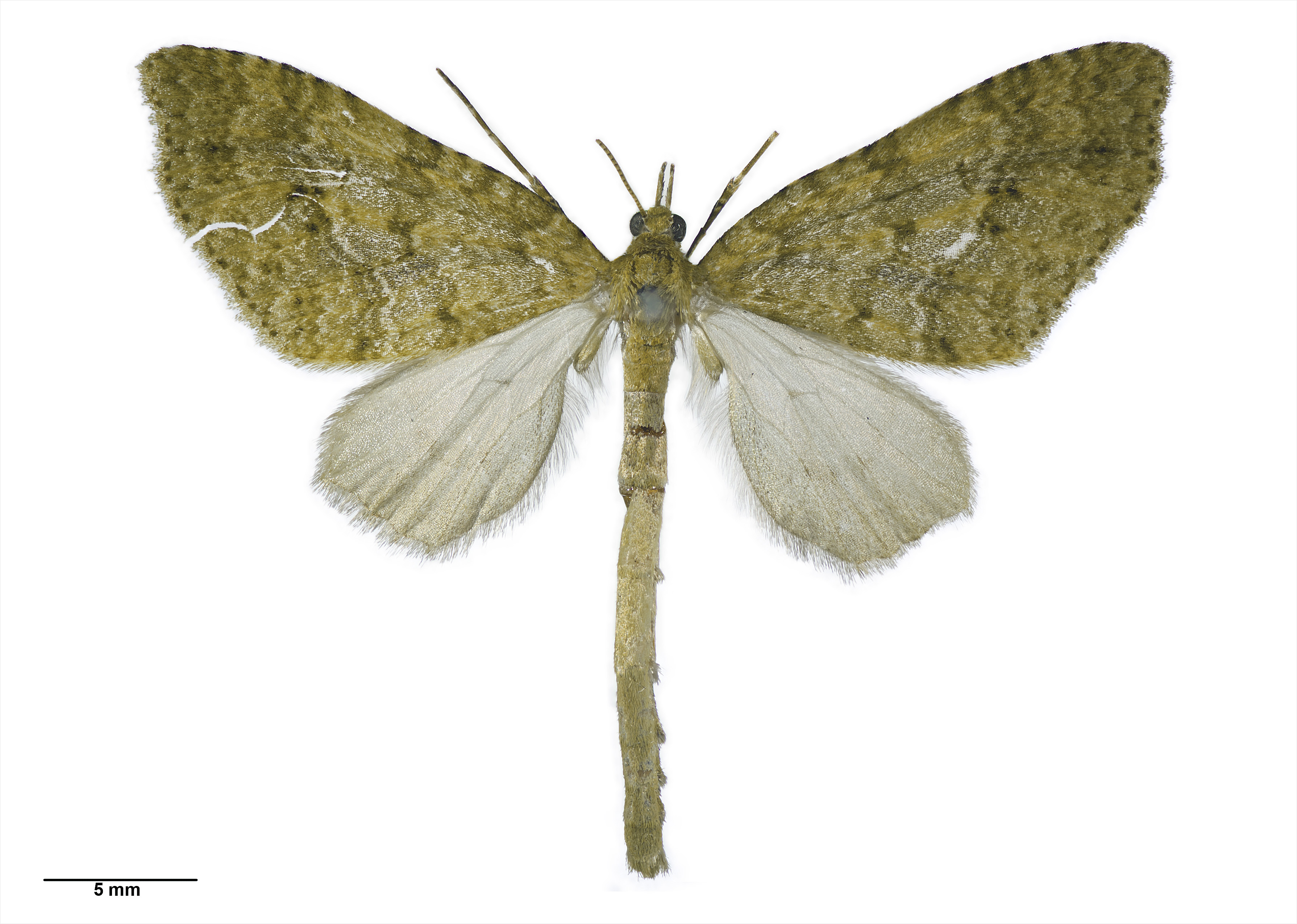
Holotype of Tatosoma monoviridisata, one of the first species Clarks described in 1920

- Asaphodes citroena (1934)
- Asaphodes ida (1926)
- Asterivora chatuidea] (1926)
- Asterivora urbana (1926)
- Ericodesma cuneata (1926)
- Glyphipterix scintilla (1926)
- Heterocrossa sanctimonea (1926)
- Kiwaia calaspidea (1934)
- Mallobathra abyssina (1934)
- Mallobathra cataclysma (1934)
- Mallobathra memotuina (1934)
- Rhathamictis nocturna (1926)
- Sabatinca lucilia (1920)
- Scoparia sylvestris (1926)
- Scoparia tuicana (1926)
- Tatosoma monoviridisata (1920)
- Tinea aetherea (1926)

== Bibliography ==
- Clarke, Charles E. (9 August 1920). "Lepidoptera of Auckland and the King-country". Transactions and Proceedings of the New Zealand Institute. 52: 36–41. ISSN 1176-6158. Wikidata Q110226875.
- Charles Edwin Clarke (12 July 1926). "New species of Lepidoptera". Transactions and Proceedings of the New Zealand Institute. 56: 417–421. ISSN 1176-6158. Wikidata Q63101109.
- Clarke, Charles E. (February 1933). "The Lepidoptera of the Te Anau-Manapouri Lakes Districts". Transactions and Proceedings of the New Zealand Institute. 63 (2): 112–132. ISSN 1176-6158. Wikidata Q62934927.
- Clarke, Charles E. (May 1934). "Notes and Descriptions of New Zealand Lepidoptera". Transactions and Proceedings of the Royal Society of New Zealand. 64: 11–16. ISSN 1176-6166. Wikidata Q110090429.
- Clarke, Charles E. (1935). "Nymphalidae" (PDF). Transactions and Proceedings of the Royal Society of New Zealand. 64: 11–16. ISSN 1176-6166. Wikidata Q89182281.
