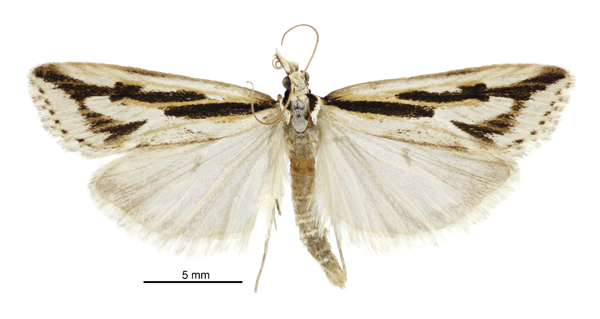
- Male

Scientific classification
- Kingdom: Animalia
- Phylum: Arthropoda
- Class: Insecta
- Order: Lepidoptera
- Family: Crambidae
- Genus: Scoparia
- Species: S. valenternota

Binomial name
- Scoparia valenternota Howes, 1946

Synonyms
- Scoparia declavata Hudson, 1950

= Scoparia valenternota =

Species of moth

Scoparia valenternota is a species of moth in the family Crambidae. It is endemic in New Zealand.

== Taxonomy ==
This species was described by George Howes in 1946. However the placement of this species within the genus Scoparia is in doubt. As a result, this species has also been referred to as Scoparia (s.l.) valenternota.

== Description ==
The wingspan is about 37 mm. Adults have been recorded on wing in December.
