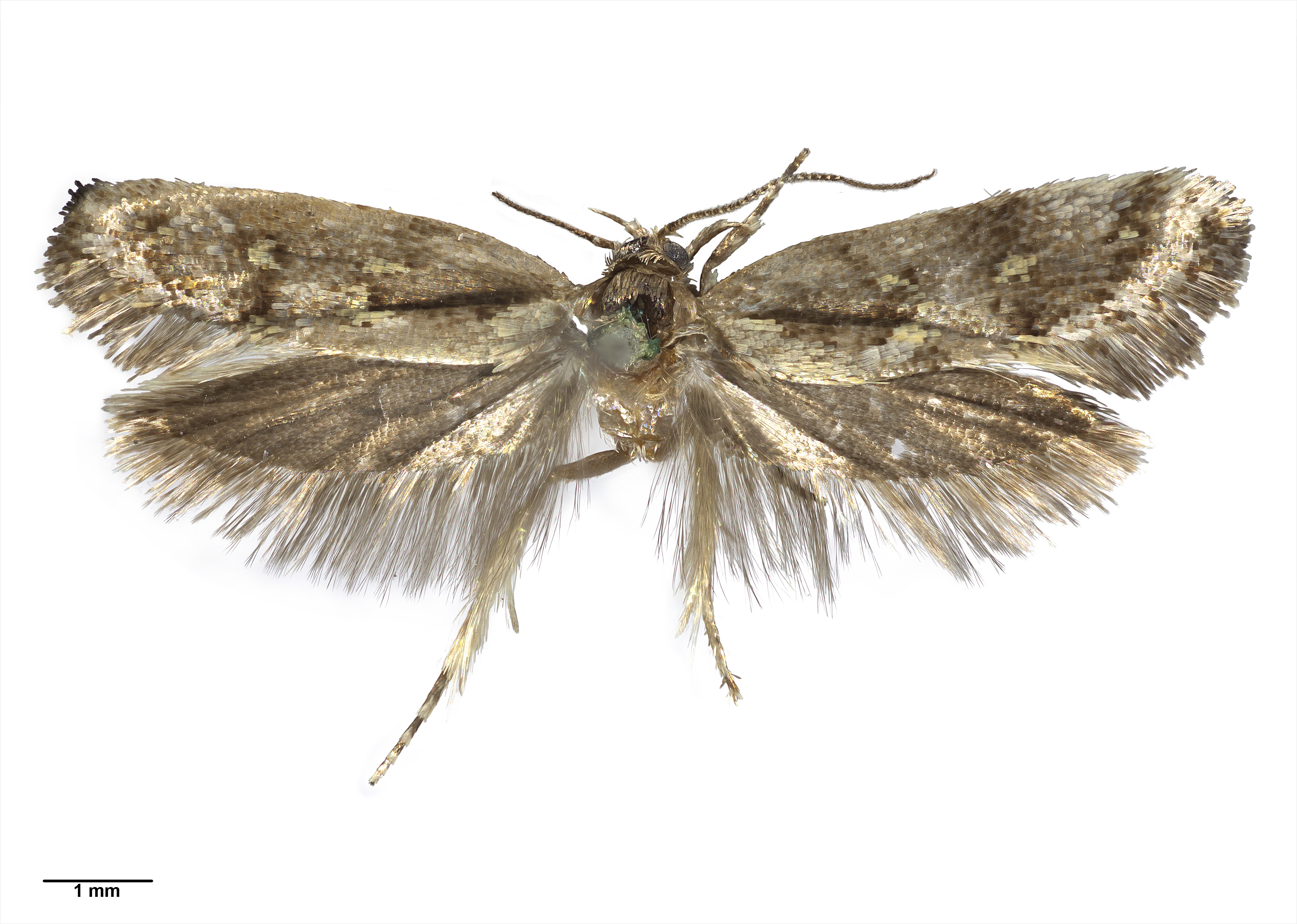
- Male holotype

Scientific classification
- Kingdom: Animalia
- Phylum: Arthropoda
- Class: Insecta
- Order: Lepidoptera
- Family: Oecophoridae
- Genus: Tingena
- Species: T. lassa

Binomial name
- Tingena lassa (Philpott, 1930)

Synonyms
- Borkhausenia lassa Philpott, 1930

= Tingena lassa =

Species of moth, endemic to New Zealand

Tingena lassa is a species of moth in the family Oecophoridae. It is endemic to New Zealand and has been observed in Otago. It frequents both subalpine habitat at altitudes up to 1100 meters down to sea level residential areas. This species' resting place on rock walls has frequently been spotted. Around November and December, you can see this species' adults flying.

== Taxonomy ==
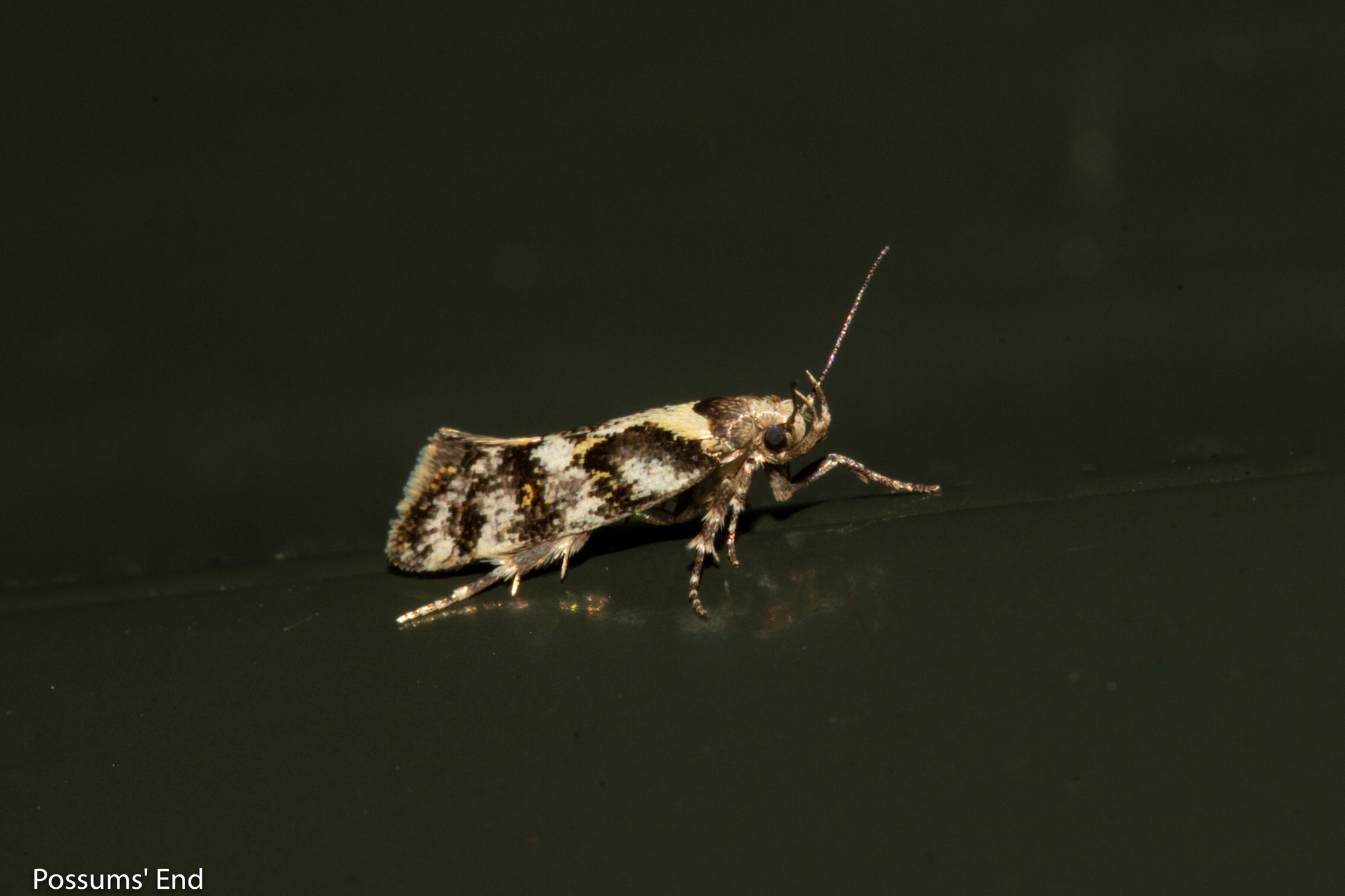
Observation of Tingena lassa.

This species was first described by Alfred Philpott using a specimen collected by Charles Edwin Clarke at Leith in Dunedin in December and named Borkhausenia lassa. In 1939 George Hudson discussed and illustrated this species under the name B. lassa. In 1988 J. S. Dugdale placed this species in the genus Tingena. The male holotype specimen is held at the Auckland War Memorial Museum.

== Description ==
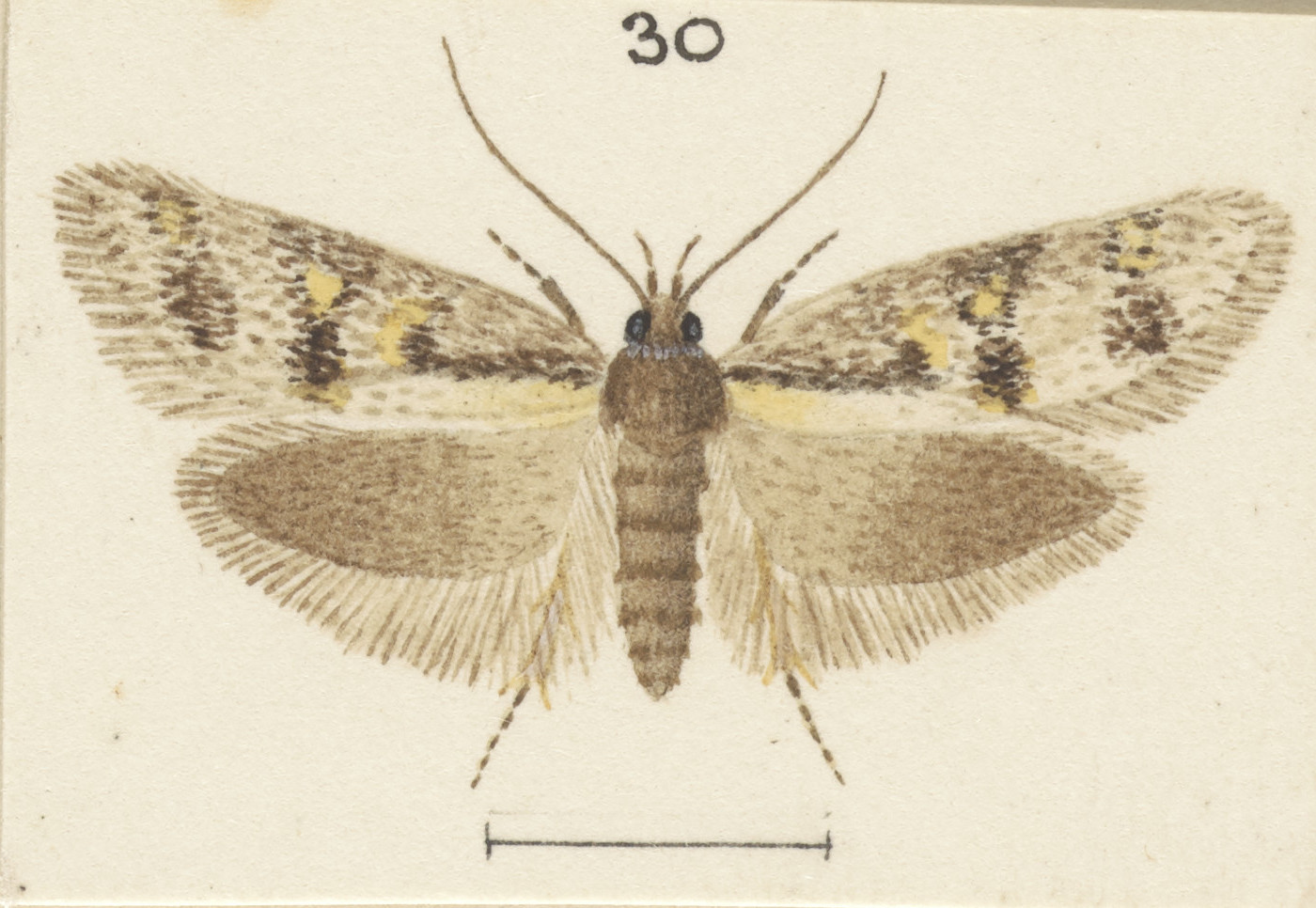
Illustration of T. lassa by George Hudson.

Philpott described this species as follows:

♂. 11 mm. Head and thorax pale brown. Palpi, 2nd segment brown with apex whitish, terminal segment fuscous, with apex whitish ochreous. Antennae ochreous annulated with fuscous, ciliations in ♂ 1. Abdomen purplish grey. Legs ochreous mixed with fuscous, all tarsi banded with fuscous. Forewings with costa hardly arched, apex broadly rounded, termen rounded, oblique; white, densely irrorated with pale fuscous except beneath fold; markings consisting of obscure brown fascia and pale yellow spots; a rather large yellow patch on dorsum at base; a brown stripe along fold connecting with a slightly outwards-curved fascia from costa at 1/4 ; a rather prominent yellow spot at junction of these two fasciae and some yellow scales mixed with fascia from costa; a brown fascia from costa at 1/2 to tornus enclosing a yellow spot in disc and with some yellow scales at tornus; an obscure brown subterminal fascia containing some yellow scales: fringes brown with some white and yellow scales. Hindwings and fringes fuscous grey.

== Distribution ==
This species is endemic to New Zealand and has been observed in Otago.

== Habitat ==
This species has been observed in both subalpine habitat at altitudes of up to 1100 metres, resting on rock faces, as well as at sea level near a residential stream.

== Behaviour ==
The adults of this species are on the wing in November and December.
