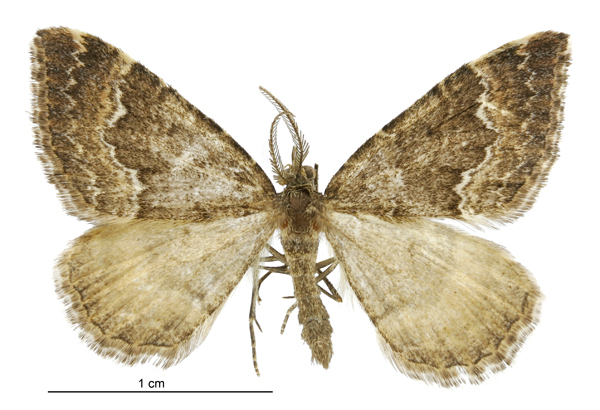
- Male
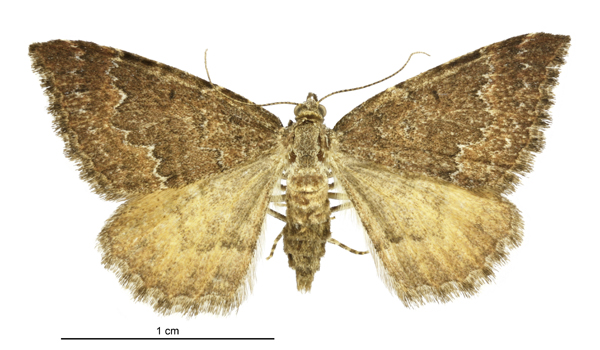
- Female

Scientific classification
- Kingdom: Animalia
- Phylum: Arthropoda
- Clade: Pancrustacea
- Class: Insecta
- Order: Lepidoptera
- Family: Geometridae
- Genus: Asaphodes
- Species: A. ida

Binomial name
- Asaphodes ida (Clarke, 1926)

Synonyms
- Xanthorhoe ida Clarke, 1926

= Asaphodes ida =

Species of moth

Asaphodes ida is a species of moth in the family Geometridae. It is endemic to New Zealand. This moth can be found in upland or alpine habitat in Canterbury and Otago. Although not classified under the New Zealand Threat Classification system, this species is regarded as rare.

== Taxonomy ==
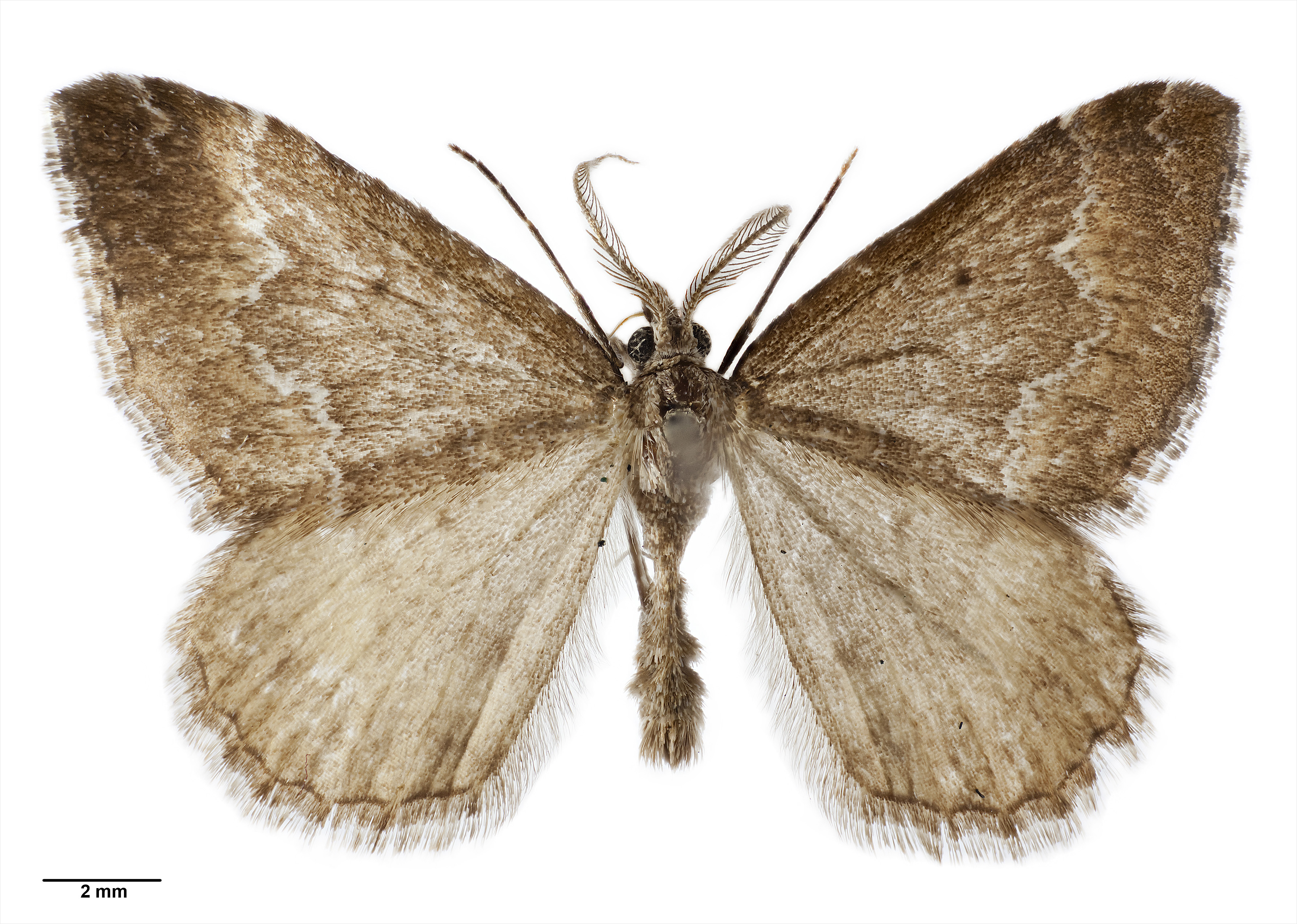
Male holotype specimen

This species was described by Charles E. Clarke in 1926 as Xanthorhoe ida, using material collected by George Howes in February of that year at Eweburn Stream, Mount Ida in Canterbury. George Hudson discussed and illustrated this species as Xanthorhoe ida in 1928. In 1987 Robin C. Craw, after considering its genital structure, proposed assigning this species to the genus Asaphodes. In 1988 John S. Dugdale agreed with this proposal. The male holotype specimen, collected at Eweburn Stream, Mount Ida, is held at the Auckland War Memorial Museum.

== Description ==
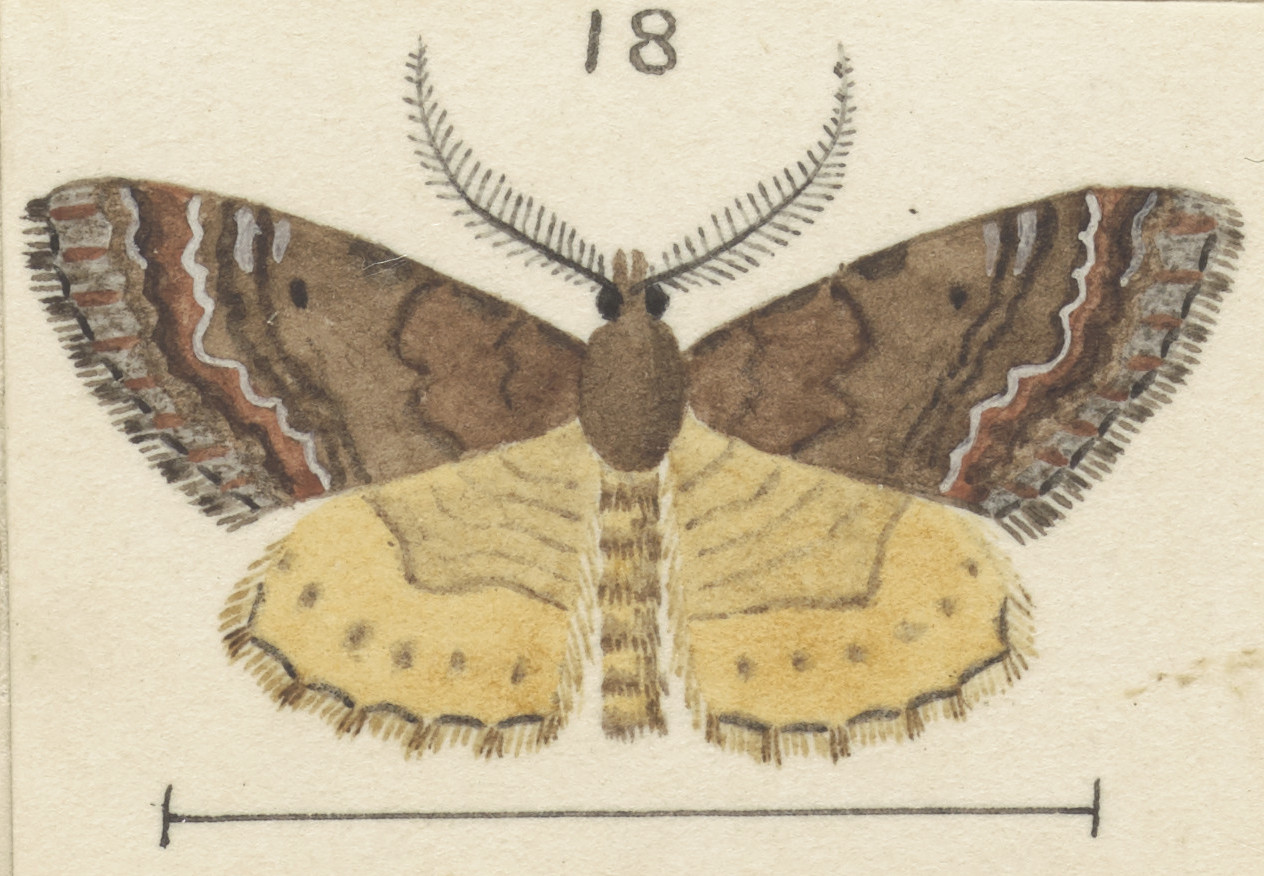
Illustration of A. ida by George Hudson.

Clarke described the species as follows:

♂. 24 mm. Head, palpi, and thorax grey-fuscous. Antennae fuscous, pectinations 6. Abdomen grey-fuscous. Forewings elongate-triangular, costa outwardly rounded, apex bluntly pointed, termen slightly sinuate, oblique; brown-ocherous with admixture of reddish, lines white; an irregular wide transverse band at 1/4, outwardly convex in middle, slightly reddish with narrow white edges on either side; at 3/4 a transverse dentate white line with largest dentations outwardly about middle; reddish beyond this and then darkening into brown-ochreous towards termen; a blackish discal dot; subterminal line dentate, white, inwardly edged with dark brown: cilia dark fuscous. Hindwings dark grey-ochreous on inner half, externally lighter ochreous, crenulate markings along termen: cilia dark fuscous.

== Distribution ==
This species is endemic to New Zealand. It is found in the Ida Range in Canterbury, as well as on the Hawkdun Range in Central Otago. This moth is regarded as being rare.

== Biology and life cycle ==
A. ida is on the wing in February.

== Habitat and host plant ==
A. ida frequents upland or alpine wetland habitat at between 800 and 1,100 meters in altitude.
