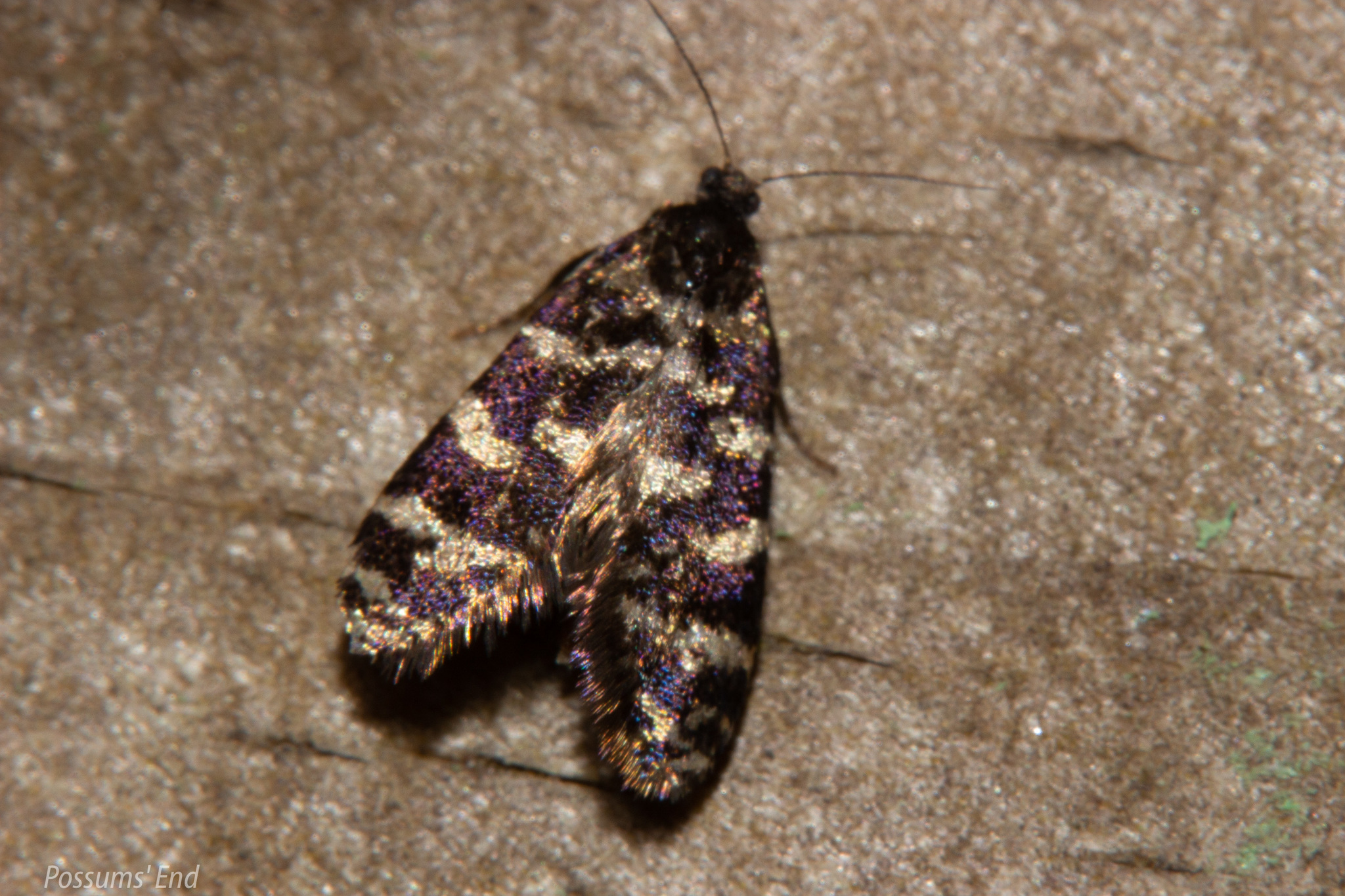

Scientific classification
- Domain: Eukaryota
- Kingdom: Animalia
- Phylum: Arthropoda
- Class: Insecta
- Order: Lepidoptera
- Family: Psychidae
- Genus: Mallobathra
- Species: M. memotuina

Binomial name
- Mallobathra memotuina Clarke, 1934

= Mallobathra memotuina =

Species of moth

Mallobathra memotuina is a moth of the family Psychidae. It was described by Charles Edwin Clarke in 1934.This species is endemic to New Zealand and has been observed in and around Dunedin. Adults are on the wing in November and December and have been collected just before sunrise.

== Taxonomy ==
This species was first described by Charles Edwin Clarke in 1934 using two specimens collected on the face of Vauxhall Cliff at Andersons Bay in Dunedin. George Hudson discussed and illustrated this species in his book A supplement to the butterflies and moths of New Zealand. J. S. Dugdale confirmed the placement of this species in the genus Mallobathra in 1971. The male holotype, although said to be held at the Auckland War Memorial Museum, was not able to be located 1988, however the museum holds three allotype specimens.

== Description ==
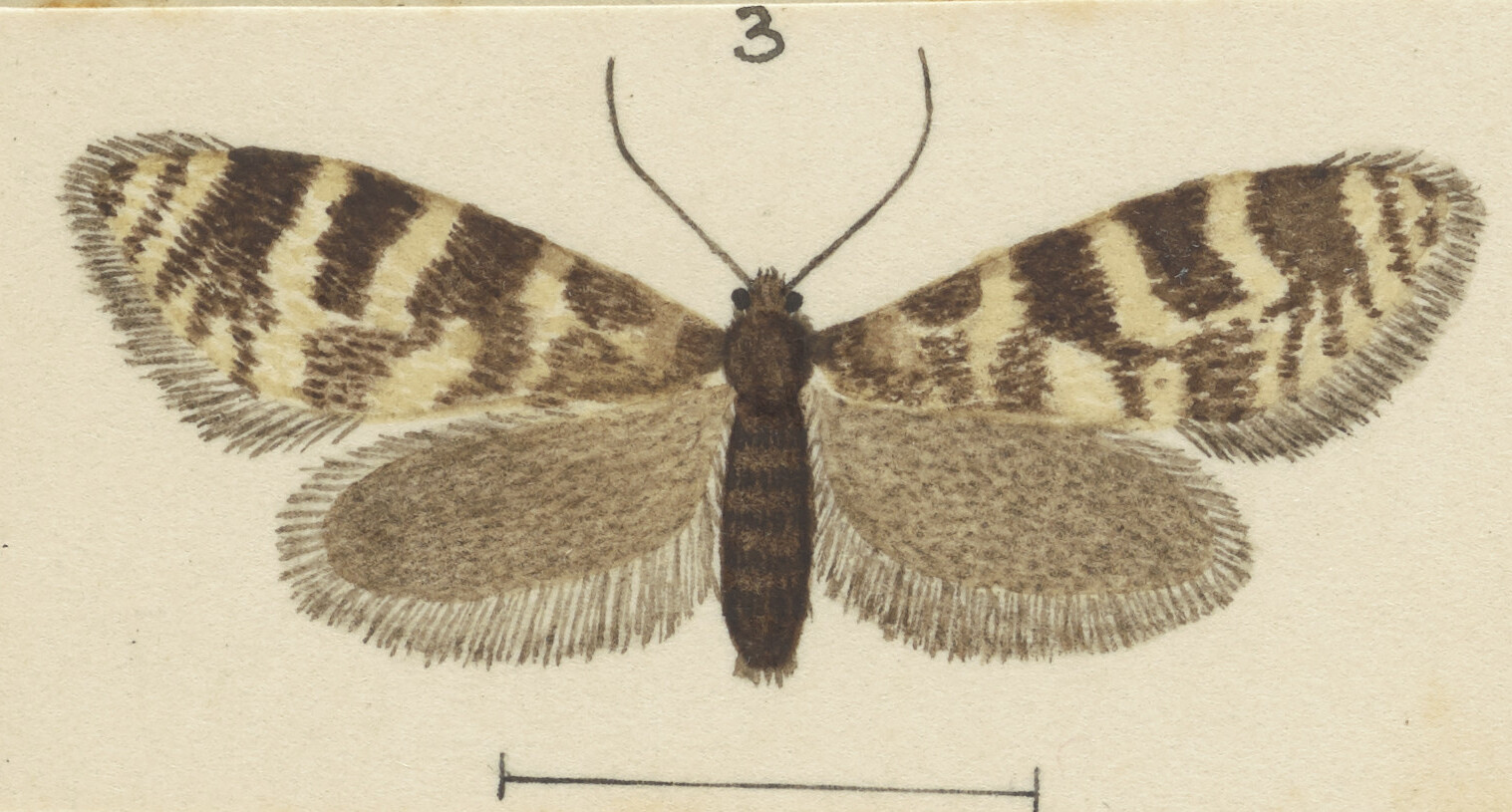
Illustration by Hudson.

Clarke described the species as follows:

♂ 12 mm. ♀ 14 mm. Head and palpi purplish and fuscous brown. Antennae dark fuscous with admixture of ochreous; ciliations in ♂ 2. Thorax and abdomen dark purplish brown; legs purplish brown mixed with ochreous and annulated on tibia and tarsi. Forewings elongate; costa moderately arched, apex rather acutely rounded, termen strongly oblique; purplish fuscous with 5 to 6 ochreous white fasciae from costa. Basal one is at about 1/6 outwardly oblique, second at 1/3 inwardly oblique, the third at 1/2 broken in centre of wing after waving outwardly, then inwardly to dorsum, the fourth at 2/3 more straight to dorsum, but sometimes broken and spotted with purplish, fifth and sixth close together before apical patch, outwardly oblique; cilia dark fuscous. Hindwings dark fuscous; cilia fuscous, apically pale.

== Distribution ==
M. memotuina is endemic to New Zealand. This species has been observed in and around Dunedin.

== Behaviour ==
Adults of this species have been collected just before the sun rises. Adults are on the wing in November and December.
