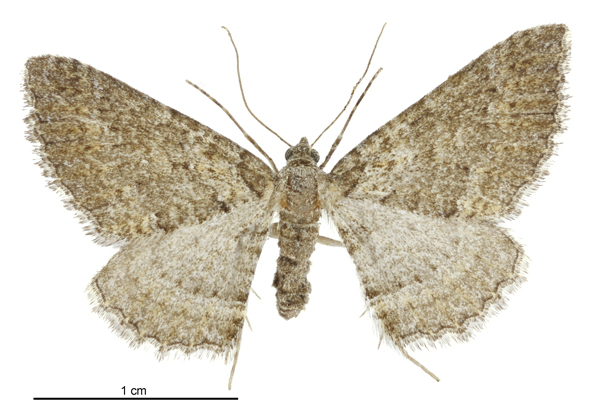
- Female
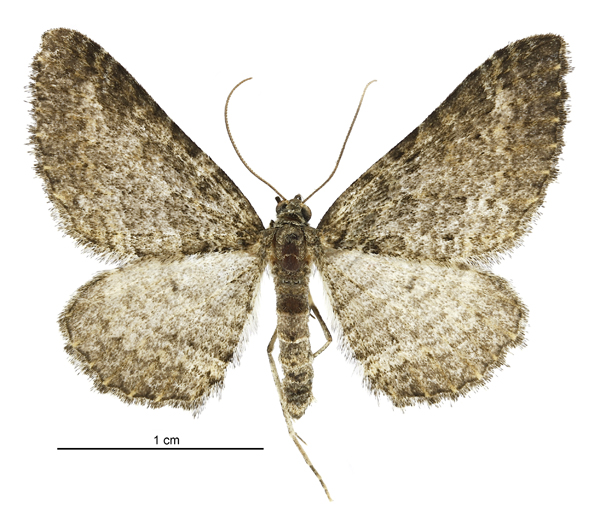
- Male

Conservation status
- Declining (NZ TCS)

Scientific classification
- Kingdom: Animalia
- Phylum: Arthropoda
- Class: Insecta
- Order: Lepidoptera
- Family: Geometridae
- Genus: Hydriomena
- Species: H. clarkei

Binomial name
- Hydriomena clarkei (Howes, 1917)

Synonyms
- Chloroclystis clarkei Howes, 1917

= Hydriomena clarkei =

Species of moth

Hydriomena clarkei is a species of moth in the family Geometridae. This species is endemic to New Zealand. It is classified as "At Risk, Declining'" by the Department of Conservation.

== Taxonomy ==
This species was first described by George Howes in 1917 and named Chloroclystis clarkei. Howes used a specimen collected by Charles E. Clarke in March at Flagstaff Hill in Dunedin and named the species in his honour. George Hudson discussed and illustrated this species in his 1928 book The Butterflies and Moths of New Zealand. In 1988 John S. Dugdale placed this species within the genus Hydriomena. The holotype specimen is held at the Auckland War Memorial Museum. The genus level classification of this moth is currently regarded as unsatisfactory. As such the species is also known as Hydriomena (s.l.) clarkei.

== Description ==
Howes described the female adult of the species as follows:

♀︎ 25 mm. Head and appendages, thorax, and abdomen grey-brown. Forewings dark grey-brown, with the veins distinctly shown by being irrorated with black and grey to 2/3 across wing, and from there to termen irrorated with yellow and black; a black line edges costa, interrupted by two white marks at 1/3, followed by three white marks at 1/2, two white marks at 3/4, another close to apex : these marks all rather indistinct. Termen distinctly edged with a thin black line, interrupted by yellow dots at the ends of the veins. Hindwings grey suffused with darker grey, and with a rather indistinct series of transverse irregular fines; termen distinctly edged with a thin dark line, small yellow dots interrupting it on the veins : cilia light grey with a dark-grey line at base.

== Distribution ==
This species is endemic to New Zealand. It has occurred in Dunedin, Central Otago and at the Otago Lakes. H. clarkei is considered extinct at its type locality of Flagstaff Hill.

== Biology and life cycle ==
Much of the biology of H. clarkei is unknown. This species is on the wing in February and March.

== Host plants and habitat ==
The host plants of the larvae of this species are unknown but it has been reared in captivity on Geranium species. Hudson states that the species could be located amongst shrub-land containing Dracophyllum and Leucopogon species.

== Conservation status ==
This moth is classified under the New Zealand Threat Classification system as being "At Risk, Declining".
