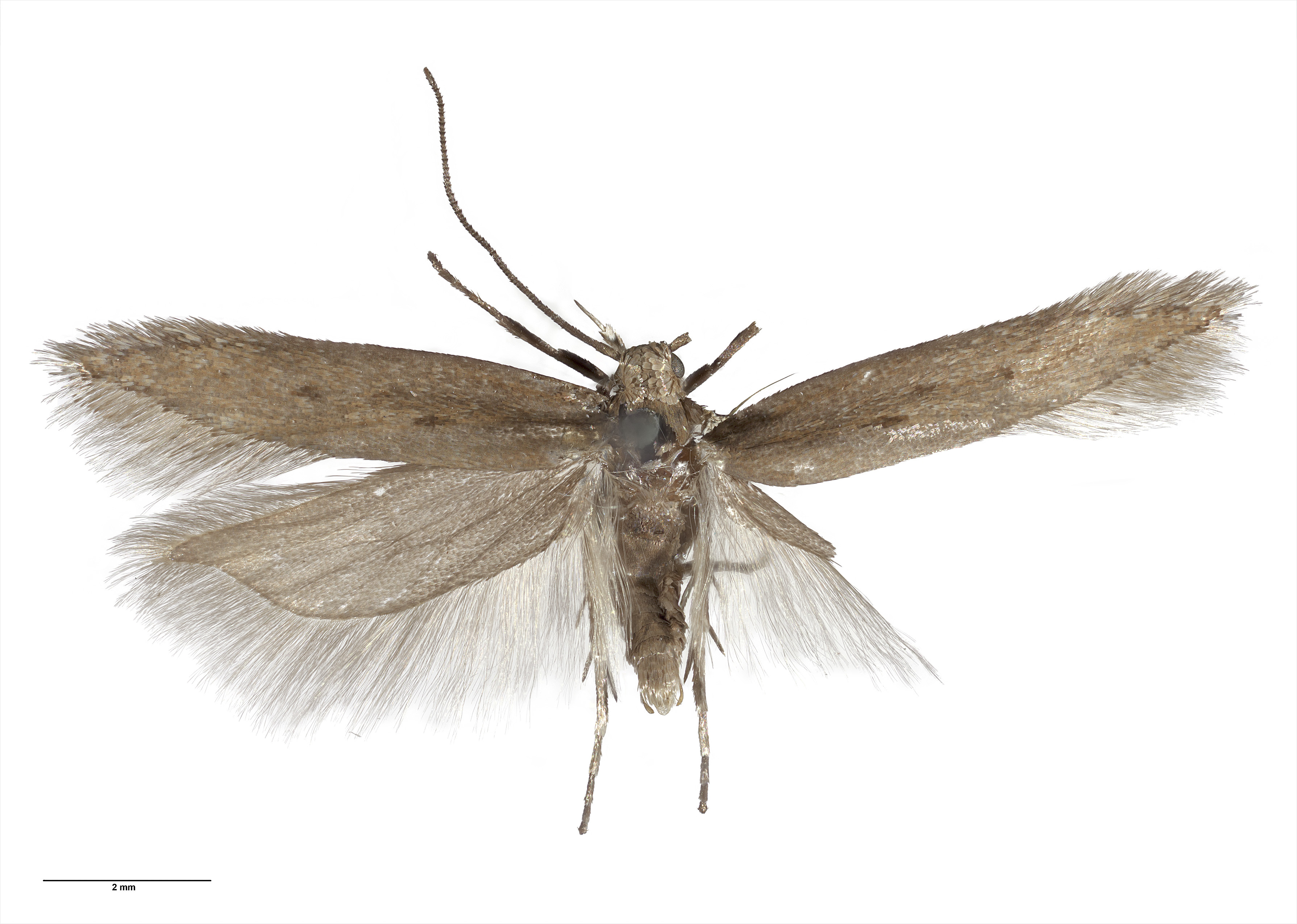

Scientific classification
- Domain: Eukaryota
- Kingdom: Animalia
- Phylum: Arthropoda
- Class: Insecta
- Order: Lepidoptera
- Family: Gelechiidae
- Genus: Kiwaia
- Species: K. calaspidea

Binomial name
- Kiwaia calaspidea (Clarke, 1934)

Synonyms
- Gelechia calaspidea Clarke, 1934

= Kiwaia calaspidea =

Species of moth

Kiwaia calaspidea is a moth in the family Gelechiidae. It was described by Charles Edwin Clarke in 1934. It is endemic to New Zealand.

The wingspan is about 14 mm. The forewings are brownish fuscous, with a darker distal dot, and dark suffusion on the extremity of the apex. The hindwings are light fuscous.
