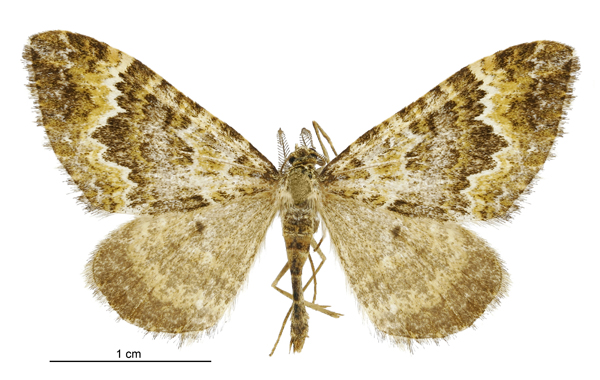
- Male

Scientific classification
- Kingdom: Animalia
- Phylum: Arthropoda
- Clade: Pancrustacea
- Class: Insecta
- Order: Lepidoptera
- Family: Geometridae
- Genus: Asaphodes
- Species: A. glaciata

Binomial name
- Asaphodes glaciata (Hudson, 1925)

Synonyms
- Xanthorhoe glaciata Hudson, 1925

= Asaphodes glaciata =

Species of moth

Asaphodes glaciata is a species of moth in the family Geometridae. This species is endemic to New Zealand. This moth has only been found in Westland in the areas near Fox and Franz Josef Glaciers. Adults of this species are on the wing in January.

== Taxonomy ==
This species was described by George Hudson in 1925 as Xanthorhoe glaciata using material collected by Charles E. Clarke at Mount Moltke in Westland in January at 1700m. Hudson also discussed and illustrated this species under this name in his 1928 publication The Butterflies and Moths of New Zealand. In 1987 Robin C. Craw proposed assigning this species to the genus Asaphodes. In 1988 John S. Dugdale agreed with this proposal. The holotype specimen is held at the Auckland War Memorial Museum.

== Description ==
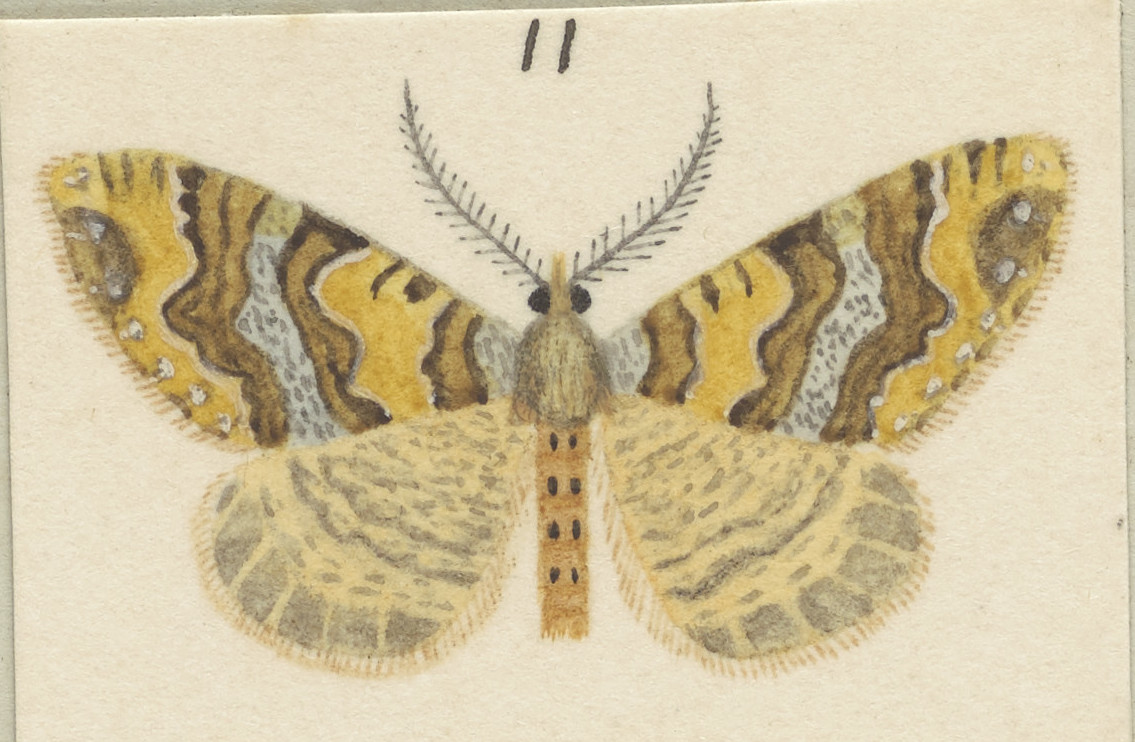
Illustration of male A. glaciata by George Hudson.

Hudson described the species as follows:

The expansion of the wings is almost 1 1/4 inches. The forewings, which have costa strongly arched near the apex and the termen obliquely rounded, are bright yellow-ochreous with blackish-brown and bluish-white markings; a small bluish-white basal patch, heavily sprinkled with blackish scales; a pale yellowish-brown subbasal band edged with blackish-brown, with two deep rounded indentations above and below middle; centre of median band bluish-white, heavily sprinkled with blackish-brown scales; the outer edge of median band from 2/3 of costa to about 3/4 of dorsum, with a very strong rounded double protection slightly below the middle; outer portion of band composed of several wavy lines of blackish-brown scales; a large suffused crescentric patch of dull brown on termen below apex; a subterminal series of diffused bluish-white spots; an obscure terminal series of brown crescentric marks; cilia brownish-ochreous. The hindwings are pale brownish-ochreous, with a broad suffused greyish terminal band, and numerous fine broken greyish lines and dots on basal 2/3; a distinct grey discal dot; cilia dull ochreous-brown.

== Distribution ==
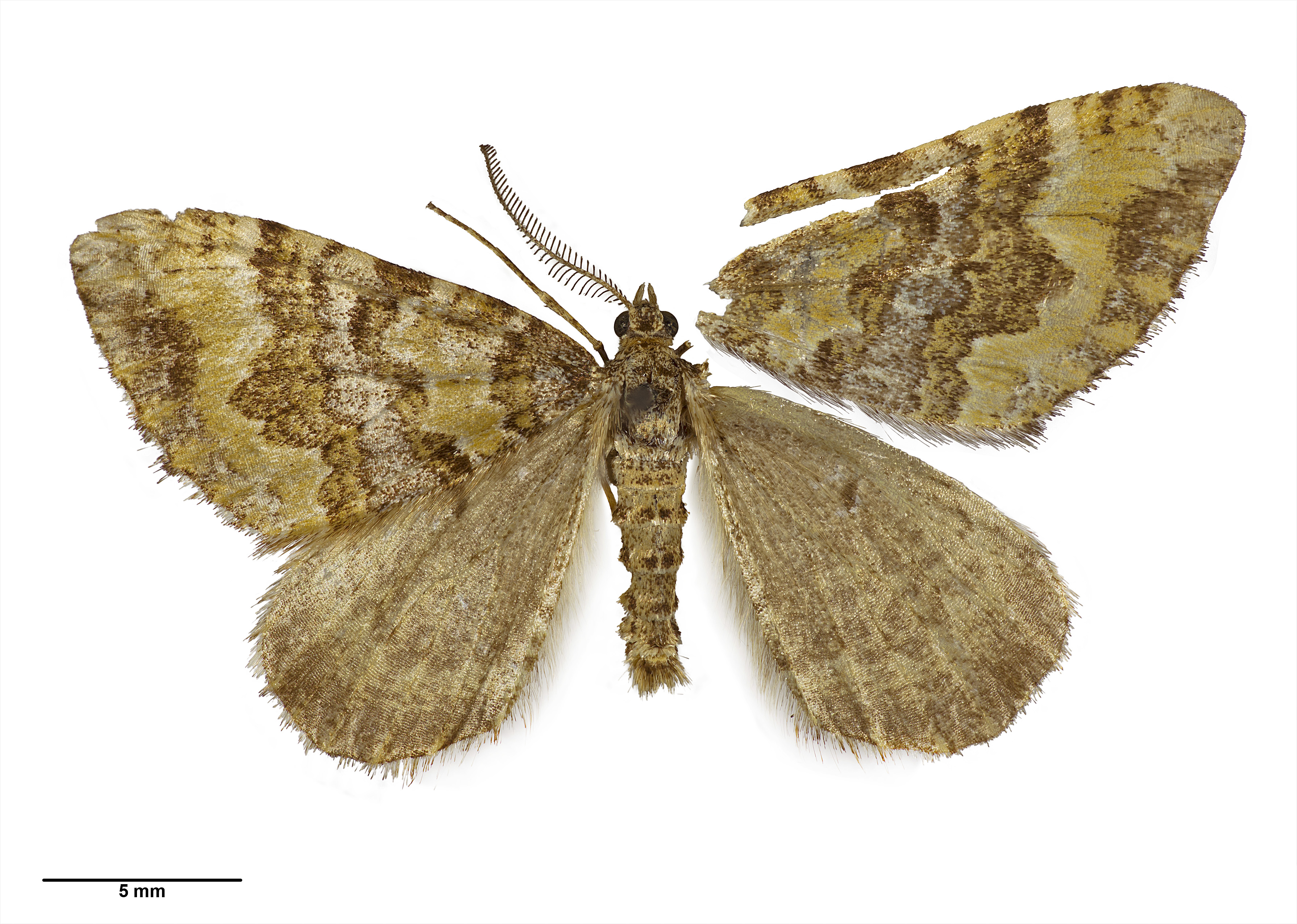
Male holotype specimen

This species is endemic to New Zealand. A. glaciata can only be found in Westland around the Fox and Franz Josef Glaciers.

== Biology and life cycle ==
A. glaciata is on the wing in January.
