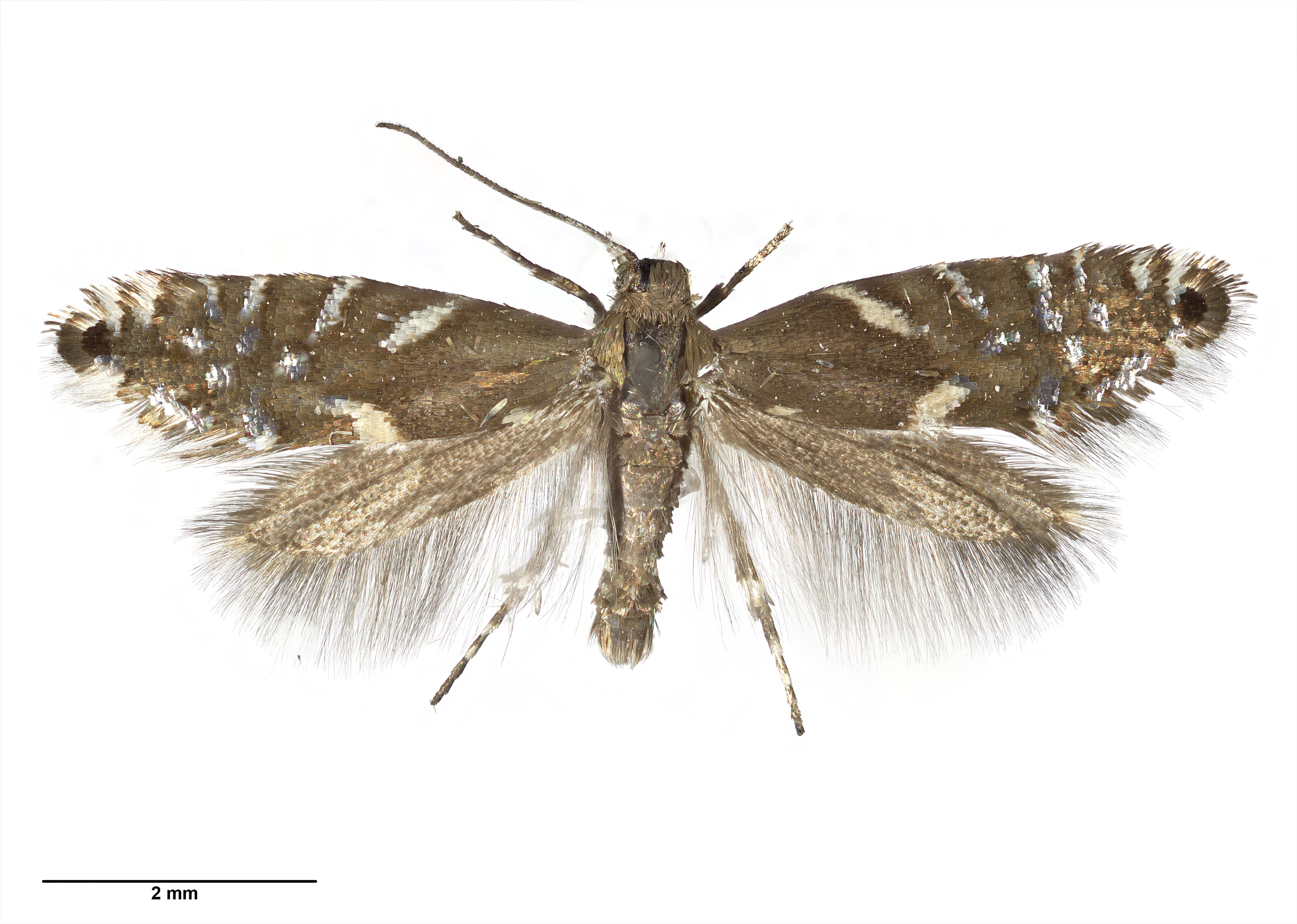

Scientific classification
- Kingdom: Animalia
- Phylum: Arthropoda
- Clade: Pancrustacea
- Class: Insecta
- Order: Lepidoptera
- Family: Glyphipterigidae
- Genus: Glyphipterix
- Species: G. scintilla

Binomial name
- Glyphipterix scintilla Clarke, 1926

= Glyphipterix scintilla =

Species of moth

Glyphipterix scintilla is a species of sedge moth in the genus Glyphipterix. It was described by Charles Edwin Clarke in 1926. It can be found in New Zealand.
