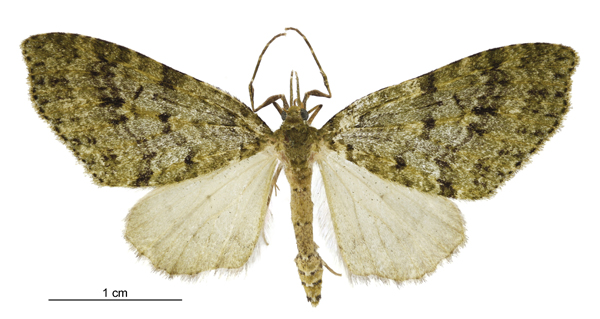
- Female
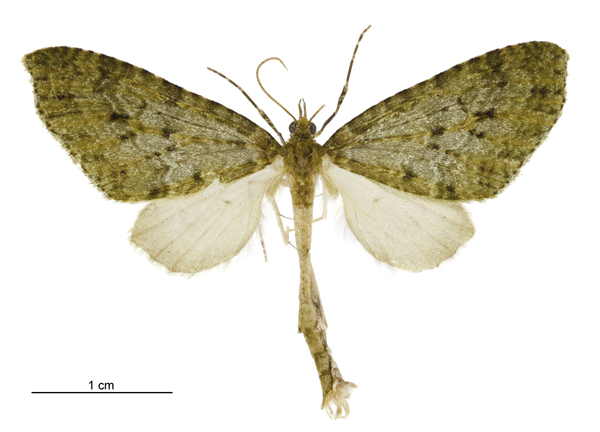
- Male

Scientific classification
- Kingdom: Animalia
- Phylum: Arthropoda
- Class: Insecta
- Order: Lepidoptera
- Family: Geometridae
- Genus: Tatosoma
- Species: T. monoviridisata

Binomial name
- Tatosoma monoviridisata Clarke, 1920

= Tatosoma monoviridisata =

Species of moth endemic to New Zealand

Tatosoma monoviridisata is a species of moth in the family Geometridae first described by Charles Edwin Clarke in 1920. It is endemic to New Zealand.
