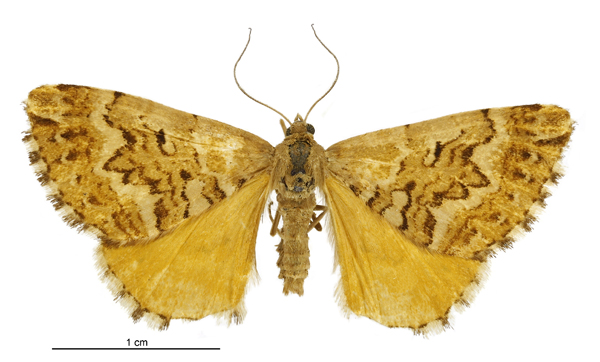
- Female
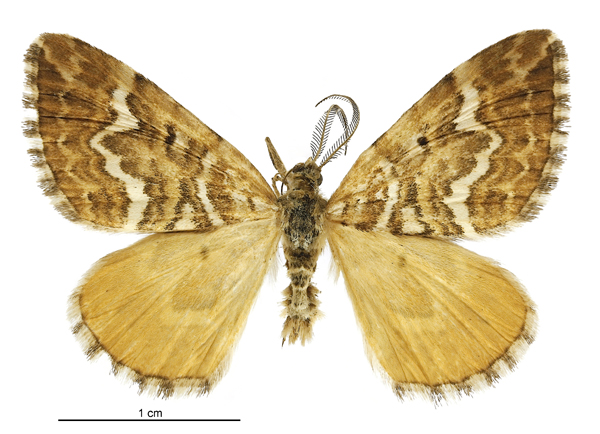
- Male

Scientific classification
- Kingdom: Animalia
- Phylum: Arthropoda
- Clade: Pancrustacea
- Class: Insecta
- Order: Lepidoptera
- Family: Geometridae
- Genus: Asaphodes
- Species: A. citroena

Binomial name
- Asaphodes citroena (Clarke, 1934)

Synonyms
- Xanthorhoe citroena Clarke, 1934

= Asaphodes citroena =

Species of moth

Asaphodes citroena is a species of moth in the family Geometridae. This species is endemic to New Zealand and has been collected in Westland. It inhabits native forest and scrub and has also been collected in open spaces along riverbeds. Adults are on the wing in December and January.

== Taxonomy ==
This species was described by Charles E. Clarke in 1934 as Xanthorhoe citroena using material collected by himself in December 1928 at Waiho Gorge near the Franz Josef glacier in Westland. George Hudson discussed and illustrated this species under the name Xanthorhoe citroena in his 1939 book A supplement to the butterflies and moths of New Zealand. In 1987 Robin C. Craw proposed assigning this species to the genus Asaphodes. In 1988 John S. Dugdale agreed with this proposal. The holotype specimen is held at the Auckland War Memorial Museum.

== Description ==
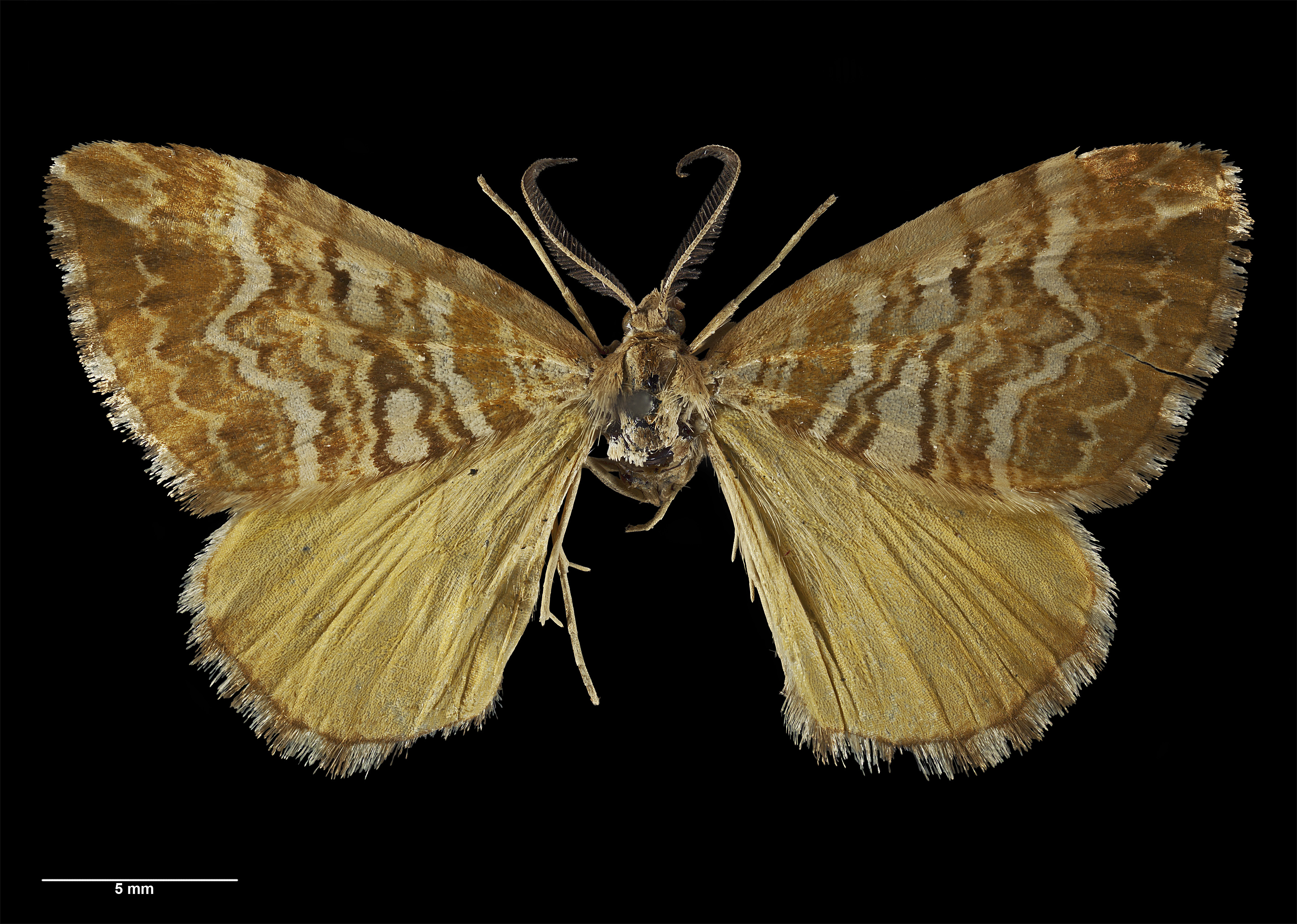
Holotype specimen of Asaphodes citroena

Clarke described the species as follows:

♂ 32–36 mm. ♀ 28–30 mm. Forewings moderate, with rounded hind margin; suffused with deep orange; two or three whitish arched fasciae near base, one or two median fasciae, more or less interrupted in middle in some specimens, attenuated in others, partly bordered with brownish which has tendencies to form several indistinct transverse wavy lines; beyond middle a whitish fascia, waved and angulated at about middle; a wavy subterminal line. Cilia light orange slightly barred with brownish. Hindwings deep orange with lighter suffusion alternating with brownish.

== Distribution ==
This species is endemic to New Zealand. This species has been collected in Westland.

== Biology and life cycle ==
The adults of this species is on the wing in December and January.

== Habitat ==
This species inhabits the edges of native forest and scrub and has been collected in open spaces along riverbeds.
