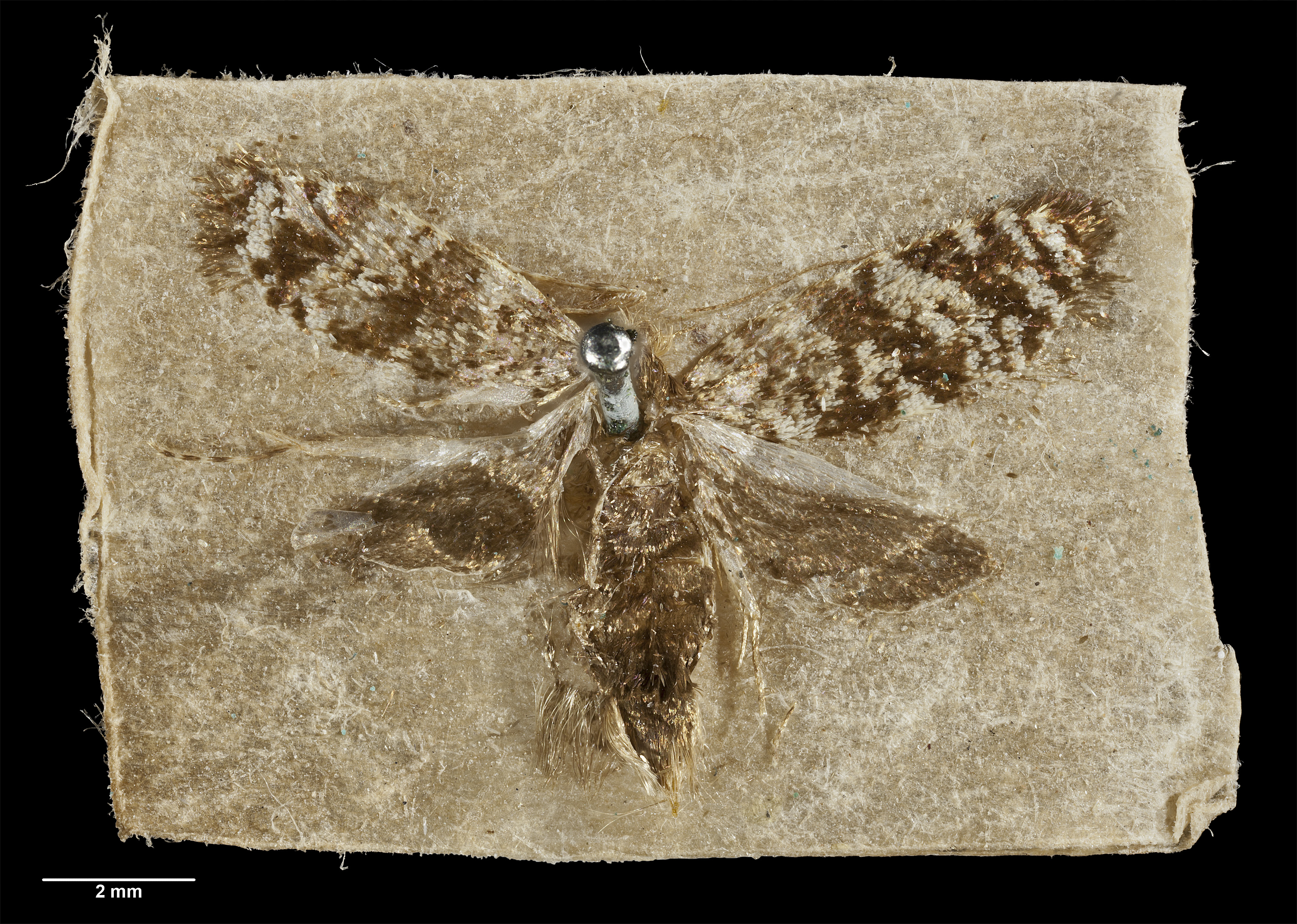
- Male holotype

Scientific classification
- Domain: Eukaryota
- Kingdom: Animalia
- Phylum: Arthropoda
- Class: Insecta
- Order: Lepidoptera
- Family: Psychidae
- Genus: Mallobathra
- Species: M. abyssina

Binomial name
- Mallobathra abyssina (Clarke, 1934)

Synonyms
- Sabathinca abyssina Clarke, 1934

= Mallobathra abyssina =

Species of moth, endemic to New Zealand

Mallobathra abyssina is a moth of the family Psychidae. It was described by Charles Edwin Clarke in 1934. This species is endemic to New Zealand and has been observed in the West Coast Region. Adults are on the wing in January.

== Taxonomy ==
This species was first described by Charles Edwin Clarke in 1934 using a male specimen collected by himself at Franz Joseph Glacier in January and named Sabathinca abyssina. George Hudson discussed this species under that name in his 1939 publication A supplement to the butterflies and moths of New Zealand. In 1988 J. S. Dugdale placed this species within the genus Mallobathra. The holotype specimen is held at Auckland Museum.

== Description ==
Clarke described the adult of this species as follows:

♂ 12 mm. Head and thorax aeneous. Antennae dark fuscous, base aeneous. Abdomen dark fuscous. Forewing ovate, rather blunted at apex; very pale aeneous with fasciae of dark purple; an irroration of purple dots on base to ⅓ of costa, where a wide outwardly oblique fascia of dark irrorated purple crosses to dorsum, another sub-parallel at beyond ½, and another also sub-parallel, more or less bifurcated, towards apex, some loose irroration between fascias, of purple dots. Cilia ochreous-aeneous. Hindwings dark purplish grey. Cilia pale ochreous-aeneous.

== Distribution ==
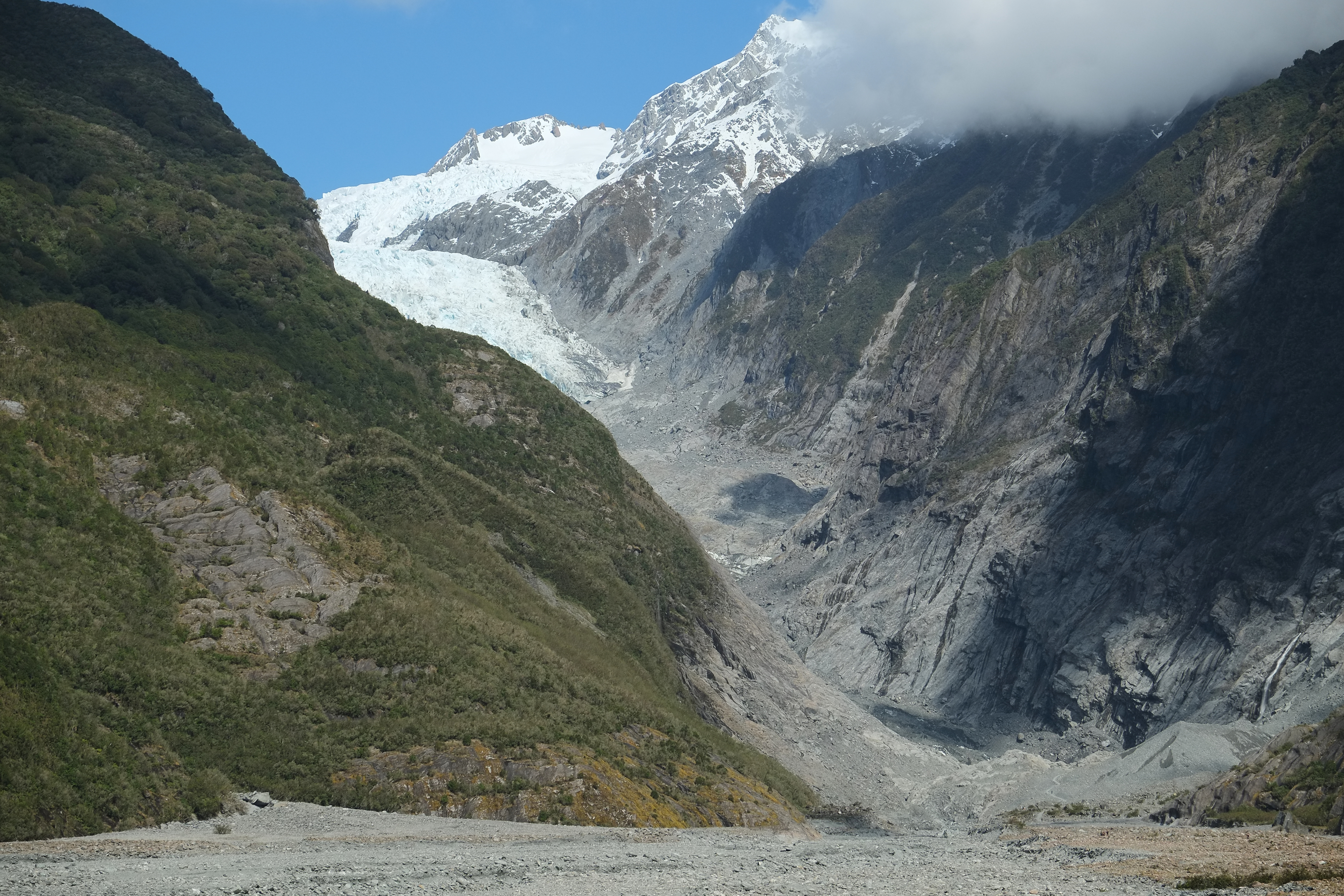
Franz Josef Glacier, habitat of M. abyssina

This species is endemic to New Zealand. The holotype specimen was collected on rocks on the north eastern side of Franz Josef Glacier.

== Behaviour ==
Adults of this species is on the wing in January.
