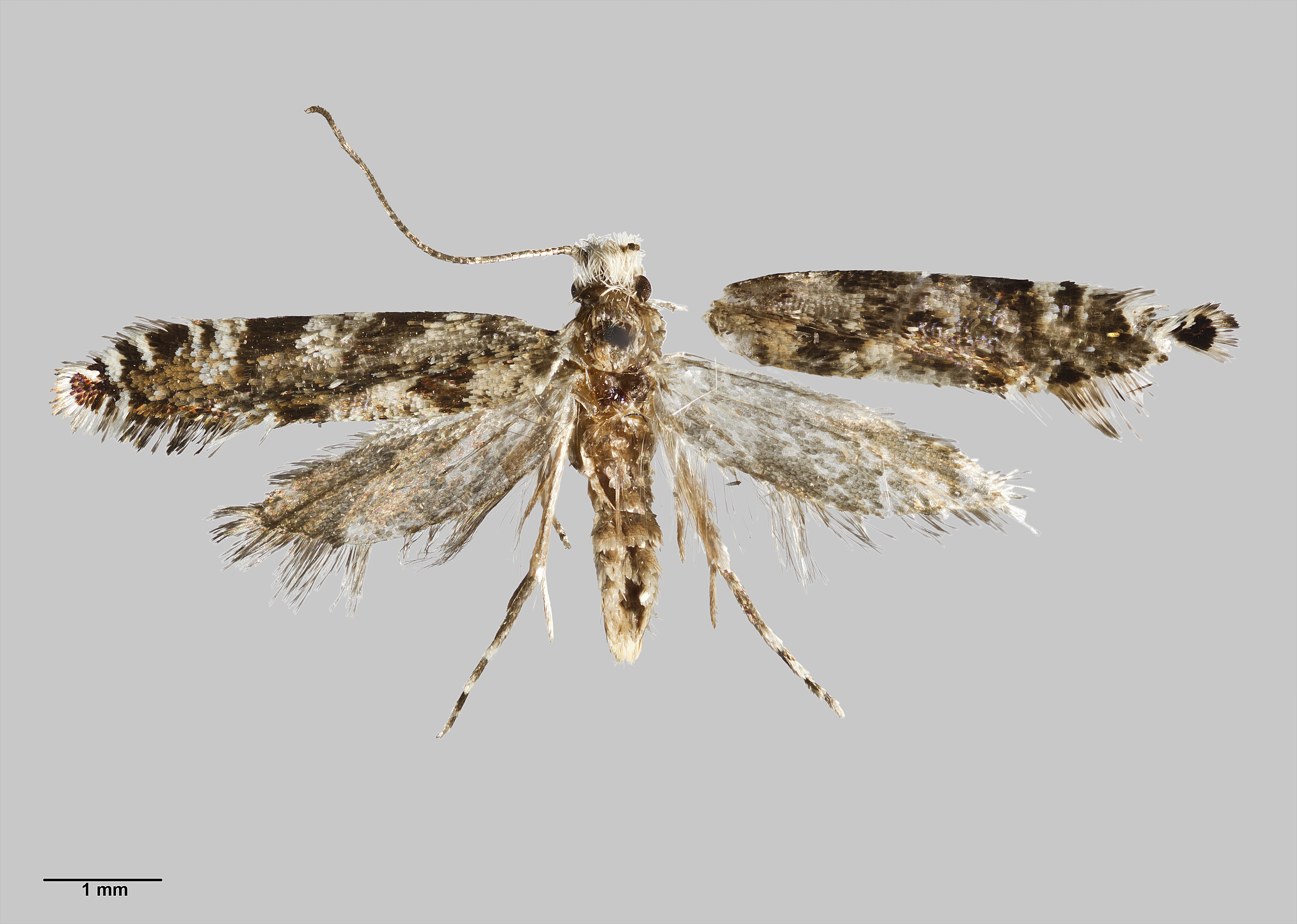

Scientific classification
- Kingdom: Animalia
- Phylum: Arthropoda
- Class: Insecta
- Order: Lepidoptera
- Family: Tineidae
- Genus: Tinea
- Species: T. aetherea

Binomial name
- Tinea aetherea Clarke, 1926

= Tinea aetherea =

Species of moth

Tinea aetherea is a species of moth in the family Tineidae. It was described by Charles E. Clarke in 1926. However the placement of this species within the genus Tinea is in doubt. As a result, this species has been referred to as Tinea (s.l.) aetherea. This species is endemic to New Zealand.

The wingspan is 9–10 mm. The forewings are purplish fuscous with grey-ochreous markings. The hindwings are purplish grey with a dark-fuscous subbasal shade.
