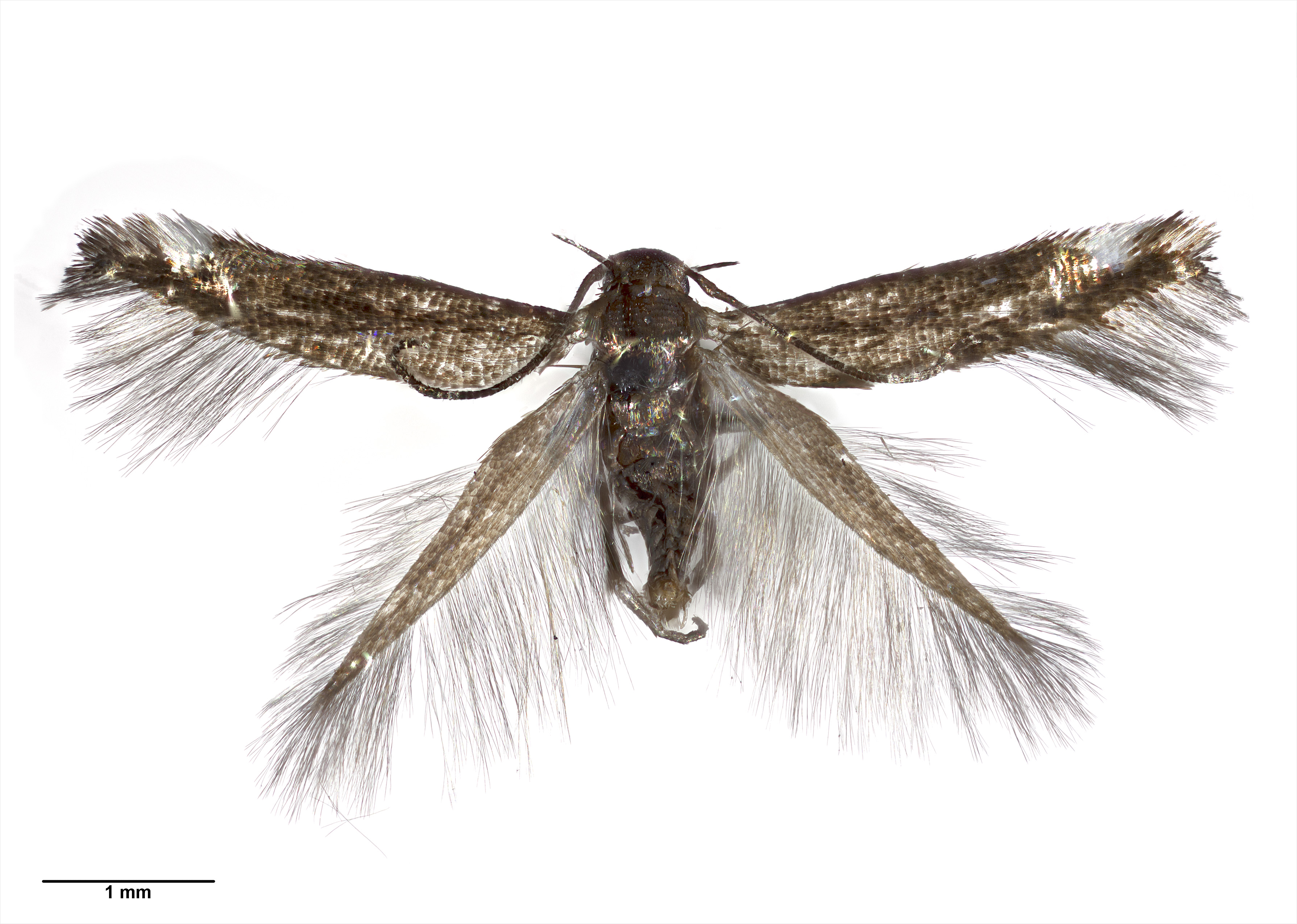
- Holotype specimen

Scientific classification
- Kingdom: Animalia
- Phylum: Arthropoda
- Class: Insecta
- Order: Lepidoptera
- Family: Momphidae
- Genus: Zapyrastra
- Species: Z. stellata

Binomial name
- Zapyrastra stellata Philpott, 1931

Synonyms
- Elachista stellata Philpott, 1931

= Zapyrastra stellata =

Species of moth

Zapyrastra stellata is a species of moth of the family Momphidae first described by Alfred Philpott in 1931. It is endemic to New Zealand and has been observed in Otago. The larvae of this species mine the leaves of Muehlenbeckia. Adults are on the wing in June and December.

== Taxonomy ==
This species was first described by Alfred Philpott in 1931 using a specimen collected by Charles E. Clarke in Wānaka (previously known as Pembroke) in December. In 1988 J. S. Dugdale placed this species within the genus Zapyrastra. The male holotype specimen is held at the Auckland War Memorial Museum. In 2019 Lauri Kaila placed this species in the genus Mompha stating "Current status: Mompha (as Zapyrastra) stellata (Philpott, 1931) (Momphidae); Dugdale (1988)".

== Description ==
This species was described by Philpott as follows:

♂. 7.5 mm. Head, antennae, thorax and abdomen bronzy brown. Palpi bronzy brown mixed with whitish. Legs bronzy brown, tibial spines on posterior pair white. Forewings with costa subsinuate, apex rounded, termen very oblique; bronzy brown; a large snow-white spot on costa at 5/6 reaching halfway across wing: fringes fuscous grey. Hindwings and fringes greyish fuscous.

This species can be distinguished from other species with a similar appearance as it has a prominent white costal patch.

== Distribution ==
This species is endemic to New Zealand. Along with the type locality of Wānaka, this species has also been observed in Richmond Valley in Otago.

== Behaviour ==
As well as being collected in December, this species has been observed in flight in June.

== Host species ==
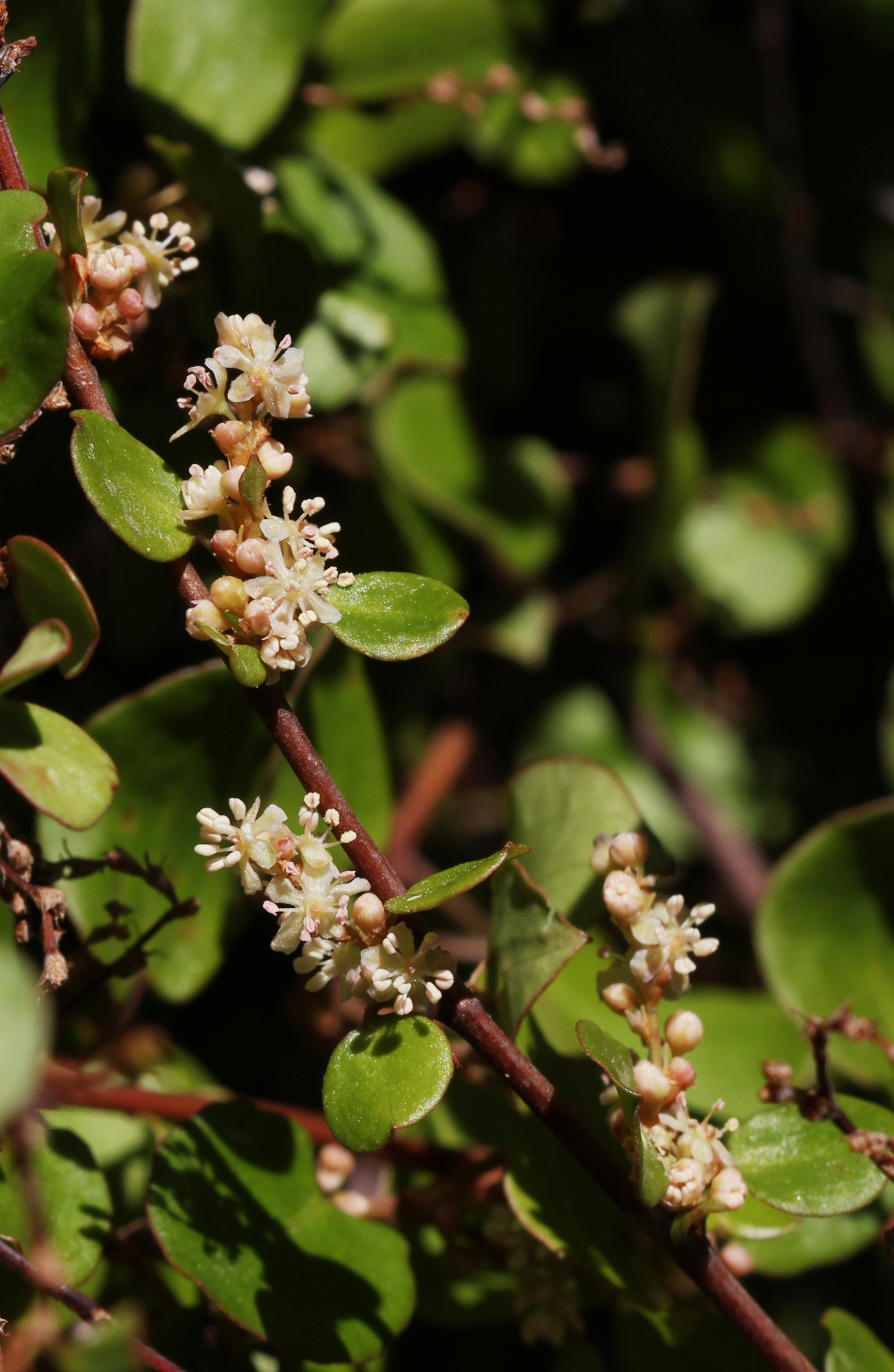
Host species, M complexa.

The larvae of this species mine Meuhlenbeckia leaves including Meuhlenbeckia complexa.
