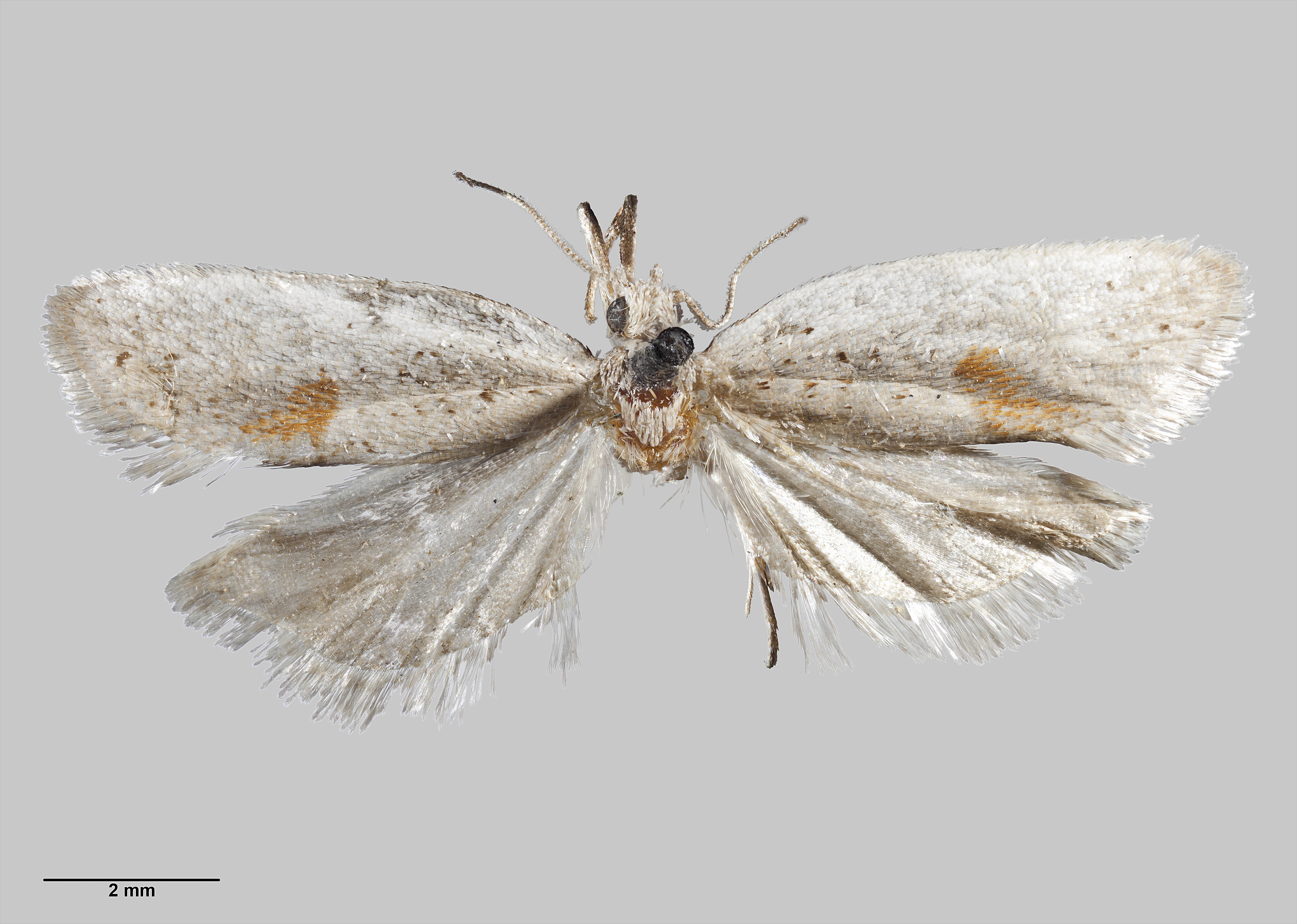
- Holotype specimen

Scientific classification
- Kingdom: Animalia
- Phylum: Arthropoda
- Class: Insecta
- Order: Lepidoptera
- Family: Tortricidae
- Genus: Ericodesma
- Species: E. cuneata

Binomial name
- Ericodesma cuneata (Clarke, 1926)

Synonyms
- Tortrix cuneata Clarke, 1926

= Ericodesma cuneata =

Species of moth

Ericodesma cuneata, the Corokia leafroller moth, is a species of moth in the family Tortricidae. It is endemic to New Zealand. This moth is classified as "At Risk, Naturally Uncommon" by the Department of Conservation.

== Taxonomy ==
This species was first described by Charles E. Clarke in 1926 using a specimen collected by him at Hope Arm, Lake Manapouri and named Tortrix cuneata. In 1971 John S. Dugdale assigned Tortrix cuneata to the genus Ericodesma. The holotype specimen is held at the Auckland War Memorial Museum.

== Description ==
Clarke described the species as follows:

♂. 13 mm. Head and thorax light grey; palpi moderate. Antennae grey, antennal ciliations 1/2. Abdomen pale ochreous-grey. Forewings elongate, costa moderately arched, apex bluntly pointed, termen slightly rounded, oblique; pale grey with a number of small obscure dots with tendency to form rows; a transverse blunt wedge-shaped red bar at 1/2 of dorsum, reaching half-way across wing. Hindwings pale ochreous-grey: cilia pale grey.

== Distribution ==
This species is endemic to New Zealand. E. cuneata can be found at Taupō, Otago Lakes and Fiordland. The species, although rare, can be found frequently at The Wilderness in Southland.

== Biology and behaviour ==
The larvae of this species web leaves together on the foliated stems of its host plant.

== Host species and habitat ==
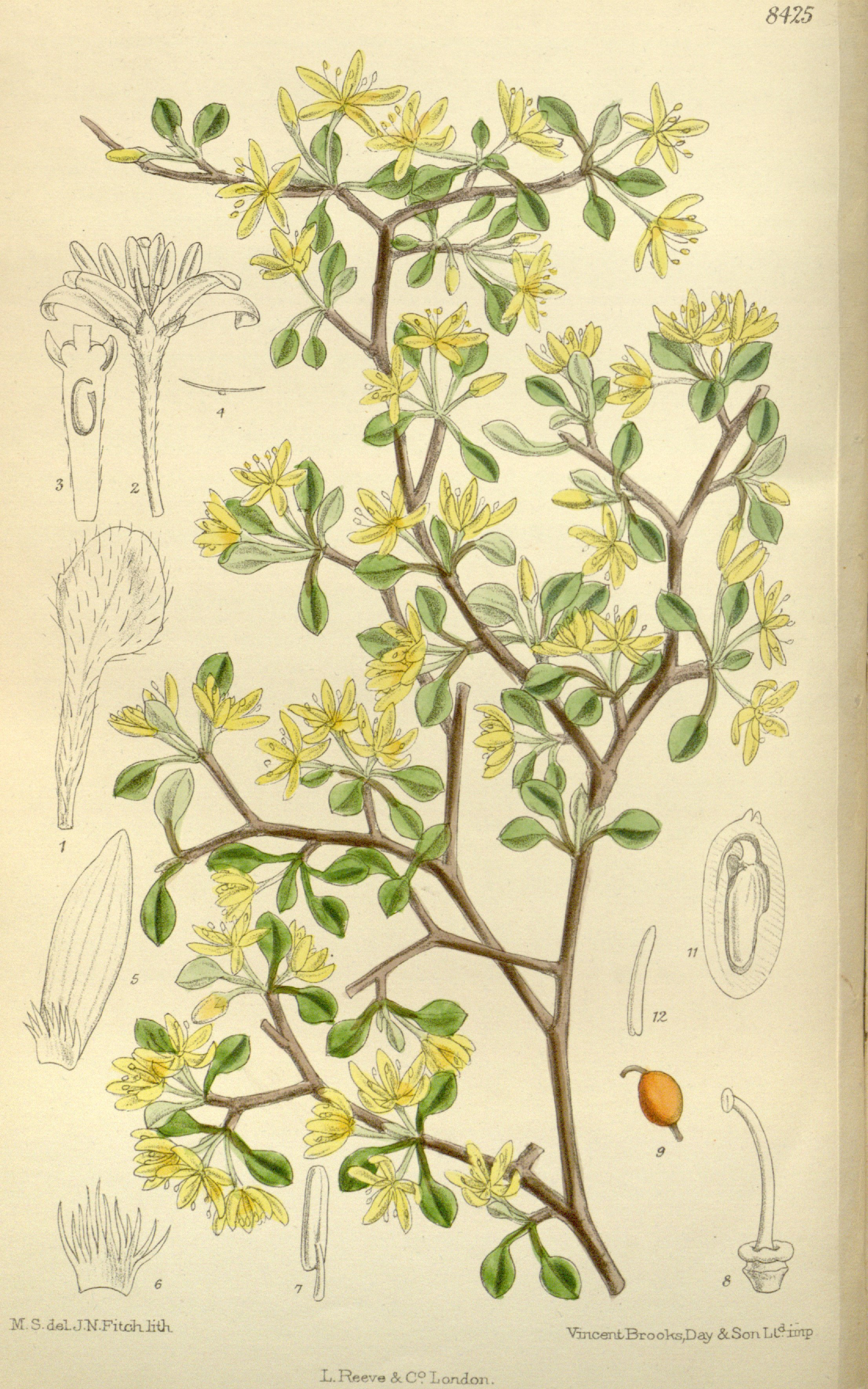
Corokia cotoneaster

The larvae of E. cuneata feed on Corokia cotoneaster, (korokio). However the moth has not been associated with urban plantings of its host. The adult moth has been collected in beech forest habitat, as well as at strongly leached terraces and plains commonly called "wilderness".

== Conservation status ==
This species has been classified as having the "At Risk, Naturally Uncommon" conservation status under the New Zealand Threat Classification System.
