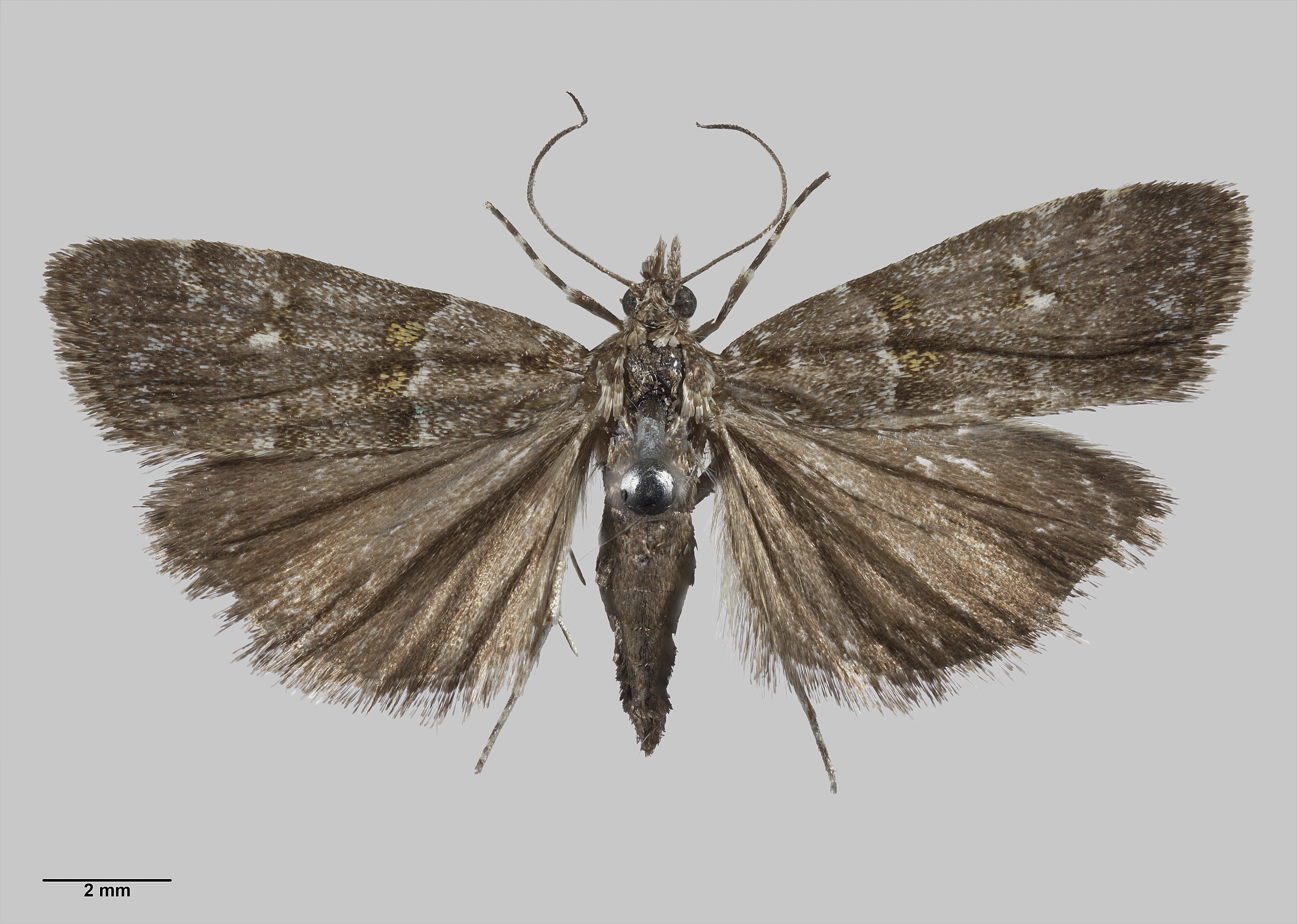
- Female holotype specimen held at the Auckland War Memorial Museum.

Scientific classification
- Kingdom: Animalia
- Phylum: Arthropoda
- Class: Insecta
- Order: Lepidoptera
- Family: Crambidae
- Genus: Scoparia
- Species: S. sylvestris

Binomial name
- Scoparia sylvestris Clarke, 1926

= Scoparia sylvestris =

Species of moth

Scoparia sylvestris is a species of moth of the family Crambidae. It is endemic in New Zealand.

== Taxonomy ==
This species was described by Charles E. Clarke in 1926. However the placement of this species within the genus Scoparia is in doubt. As a result, this species has also been referred to as Scoparia (s.l.) sylvestris.

== Description ==
The wingspan is about 18 mm. The forewings are dark green, irrorated with white. The hindwings are dark fuscous, but more dark outwardly. Adults have been recorded on wing in January.
