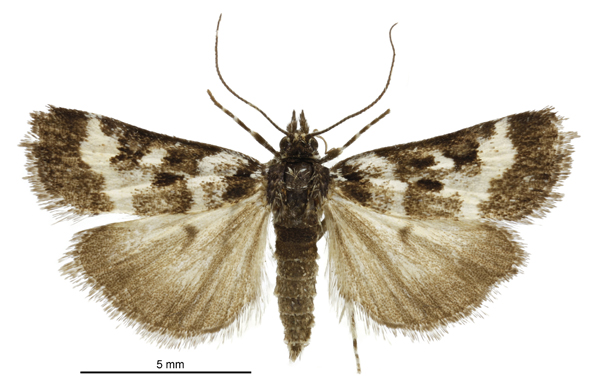
- Male

Scientific classification
- Kingdom: Animalia
- Phylum: Arthropoda
- Class: Insecta
- Order: Lepidoptera
- Family: Crambidae
- Genus: Scoparia
- Species: S. tuicana

Binomial name
- Scoparia tuicana Clarke, 1926

= Scoparia tuicana =

Species of moth

Scoparia tuicana is a species of moth in the family Crambidae. It is endemic to New Zealand.

== Taxonomy ==
This species was described by Charles E. Clarke in 1926. However the placement of this species within the genus Scoparia is in doubt. As a result, this species has also been referred to as Scoparia (s.l.) tuicana.

== Description ==
The wingspan is about 14 mm. The forewings are white and light ochreous, marked with black. The hindwings are grey-ochreous merging into blackish outwardly. Adults have been recorded on wing in November.
