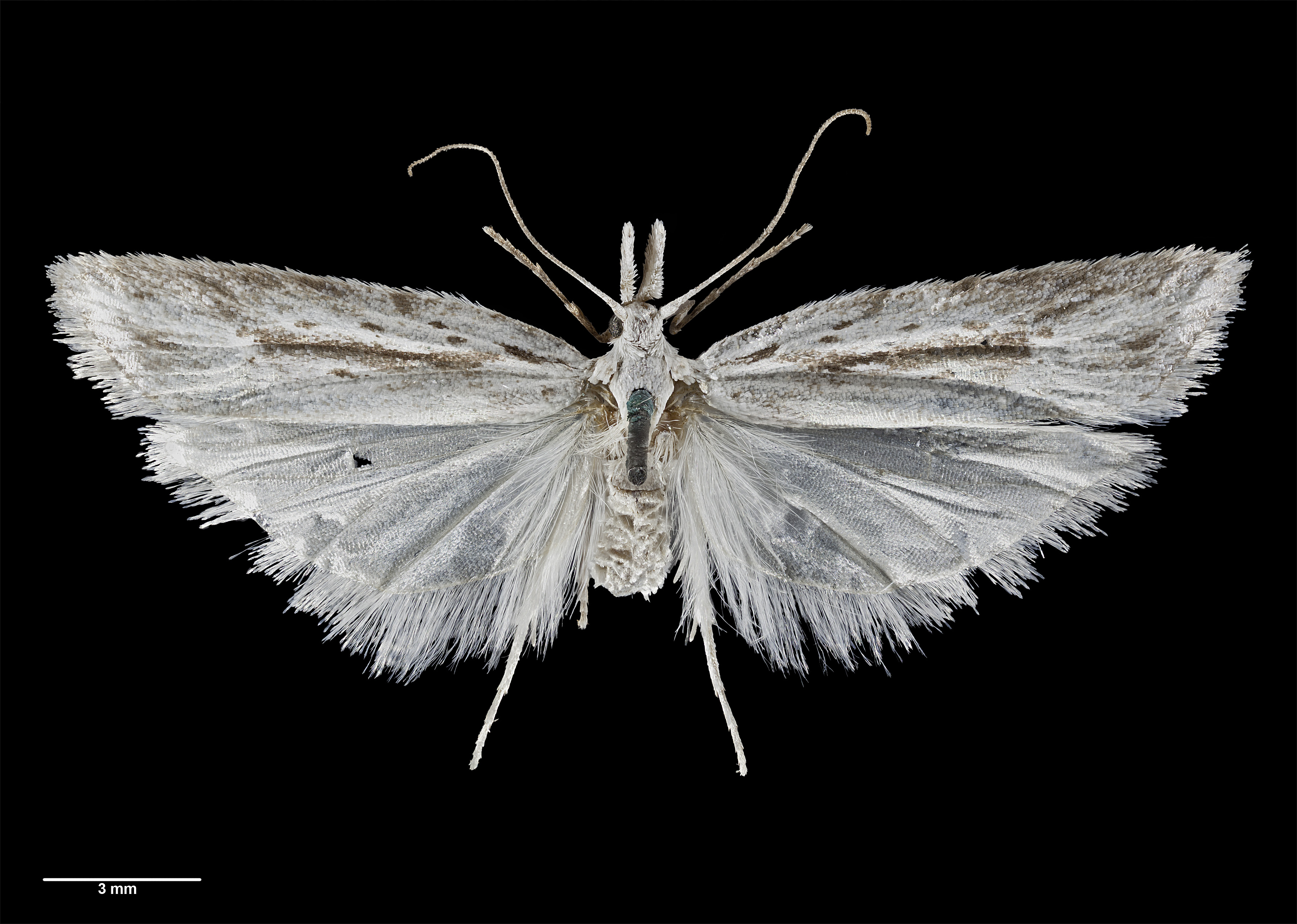
- Female holotype specimen

Scientific classification
- Domain: Eukaryota
- Kingdom: Animalia
- Phylum: Arthropoda
- Class: Insecta
- Order: Lepidoptera
- Family: Carposinidae
- Genus: Heterocrossa
- Species: H. sanctimonea

Binomial name
- Heterocrossa sanctimonea (Clarke, 1926)

Synonyms
- Carposina sanctimonea Clarke, 1926

= Heterocrossa sanctimonea =

Species of moth

Heterocrossa sanctimonea is a moth of the Carposinidae family first described by Charles E. Clarke in 1926. It is endemic to New Zealand and can be found in the South Island at Arthur's Pass, in Fiordland and in Southland. Adults are on the wing in January and are nocturnal. They are attracted to light.

== Taxonomy ==
This species was first described by Charles Edwin Clarke in 1926 and originally named Carposina sanctimonea. When describing this species, Clarke used three specimens collected at Arthur's Pass in January 1923 at an altitude of 3,500 ft (1,100 m). In 1928 George Hudson discussed and illustrated this species under that name in his publication The butterflies and moths of New Zealand. In 1988 John S. Dugdale placed this species within the genus Heterocrossa. This placement was agreed with by Dr Robert J. B. Hoare in the New Zealand Inventory of Biodiversity. The male holotype specimen is held in the Auckland War Memorial Museum.

== Description ==
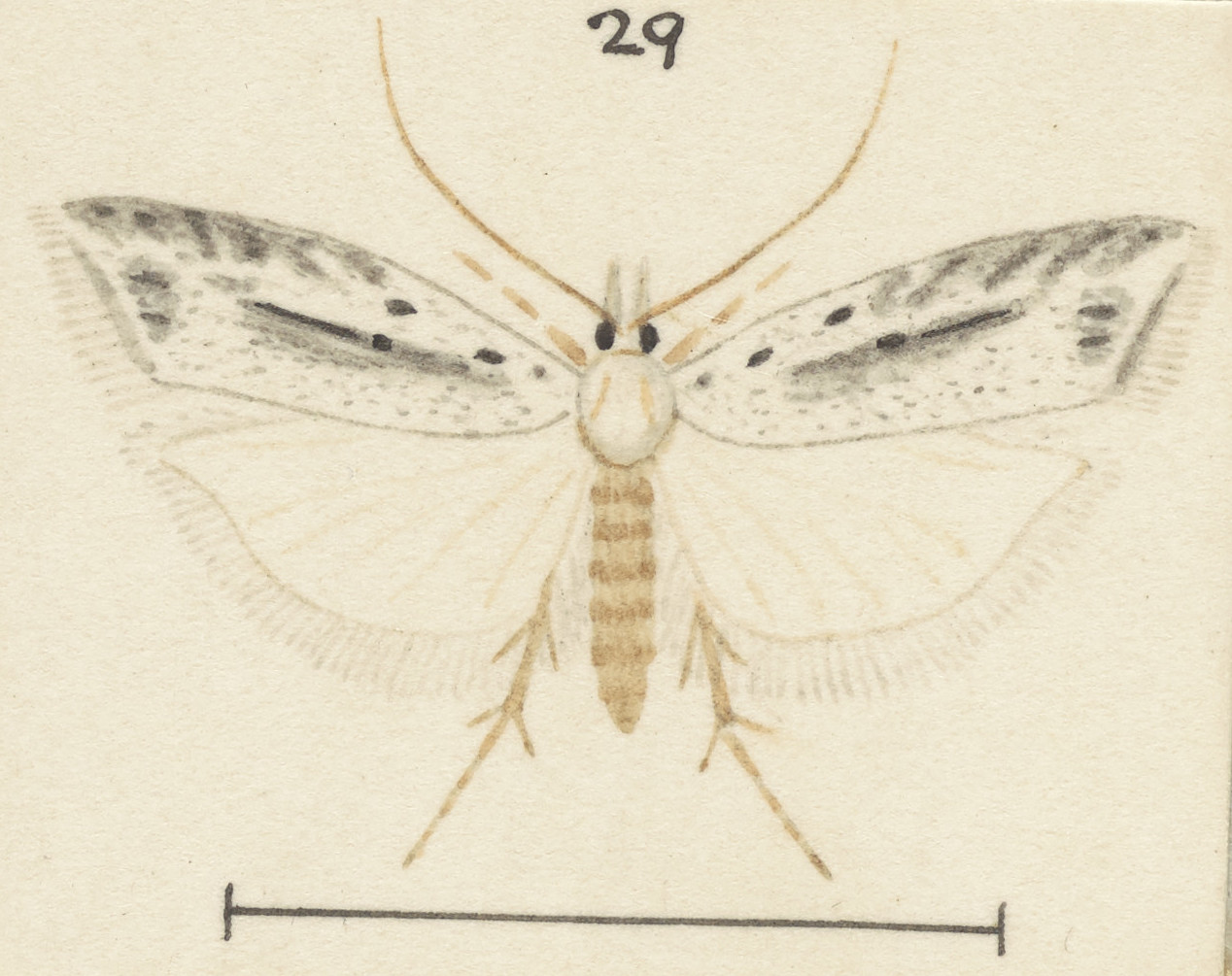
Illustration of H. sanctimonea.

Clarke described this species as follows:

♂ ♀. 23 mm. Head whitish. Thorax grey-white. Palpi grey-white above with a few darker scales, fuscous below and near base. Antennae whitish, abdomen pale grey. Forewings elongate, posteriorly somewhat dilated, costa gently arched, apex bluntly acute, termen almost straight, oblique; pale grey-white with cloudy markings of dark fuscous; from base along costa a few scattered dark scales widening at about 3/1 to a cloudy diffusion and tapering again to apex; from near base at middle a dark line, widest at about middle of disc where it ends but is almost connected with the dark diffusion from costa; a row of several black dots from near base on costal side of this, and another dot nearer to costa at about ⅕; a black dot near anal angle; a blackish irroration with several dark spots subterminally and blackish along termen: cilia pale grey mixed with fuscous near apex. Hindwings pale grey-white: cilia grey-white.

This species can be distinguished from other species within its genus by its mostly white colouring and that it is larger in size.

== Distribution ==
This species is endemic to New Zealand. Other than the type locality of Arthur's Pass, this species has been observed around the Homer Tunnel in Fiordland and in Southland at the Longwood Range and in the Takitimu Mountains and Blue Mountains.

== Behaviour ==
Adult species have been observed on the wing in January, are nocturnal and are attracted to light.
