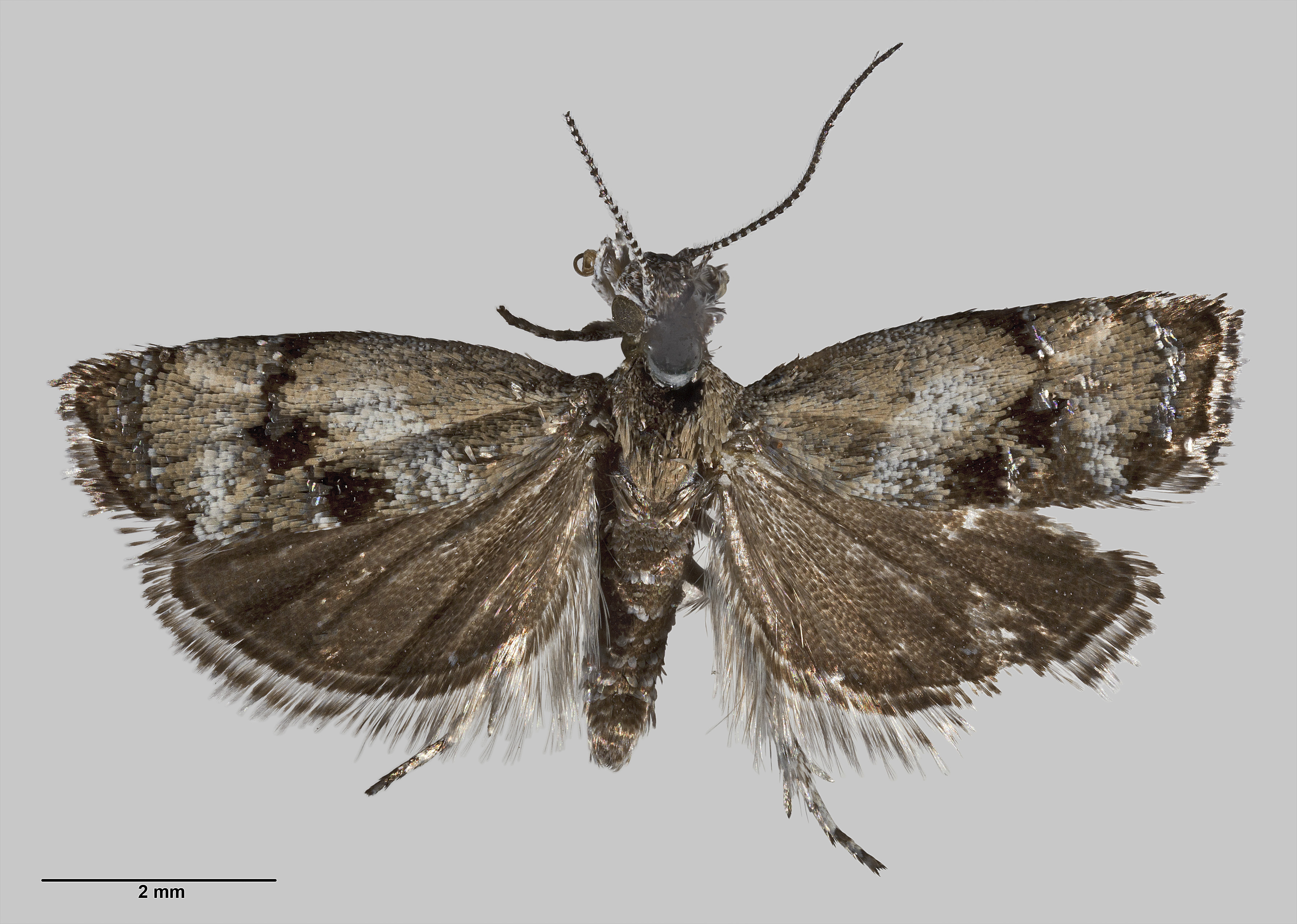

Scientific classification
- Kingdom: Animalia
- Phylum: Arthropoda
- Class: Insecta
- Order: Lepidoptera
- Family: Choreutidae
- Genus: Asterivora
- Species: A. urbana

Binomial name
- Asterivora urbana (Clarke, 1926)

Synonyms
- Simaethis urbana Clarke, 1926

= Asterivora urbana =

Species of moth

Asterivora urbana is a species of moth in the family Choreutidae. It is endemic to New Zealand and has been observed in Arthur's Pass. Adults are on the wing in January.

== Taxonomy ==
This species was first described by Charles E. Clarke in 1926, using specimens taken at Arthur's Pass on the open mountain-side at 4,000 ft. in January. Clarke originally named the species Simaethis chatuidea. In 1928 George Hudson discussed and illustrated this species under that name in his book The butterflies and moths of New Zealand. In 1979 J. S. Dugdale placed this species within the genus Asterivora. In 1988 Dugdale confirmed this placement. The male holotype specimen, as well as other specimens using in the naming of this species, are held at the Auckland War Memorial Museum.

== Description ==
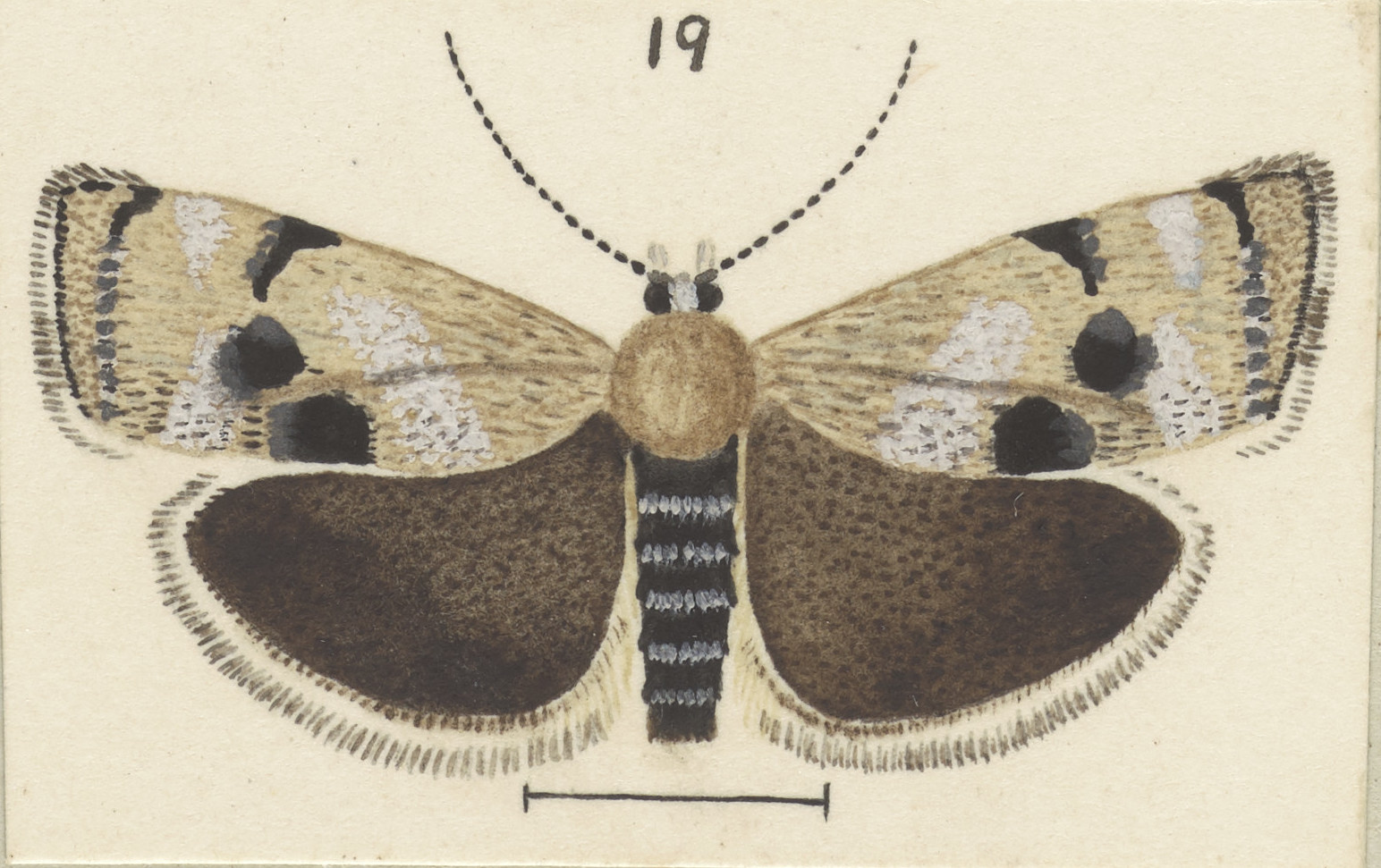
Illustration of A. urbana by George Hudson.

Clarke described this species as follows:

♂ ♀. 9 1/2 mm. Head fuscous with whitish scales. Palpi with whorls of white black-dotted scales with longer tuft beneath. Thorax bronzy-brown dotted with black and with longer scales. Legs dark fuscous irrorated with whitish. Antennae blackish annulated with grey. Abdomen dark fuscous, margins of segments grey. Forewings elongate, costa anteriorly arched, apex moderately obtuse, termen slightly rounded, oblique; dorsum gently oblique, rounded along inner half; bronzy-brown; a grey inwardly-oblique area at rather less than 1/2, distinct on dorsal side but obscurely reaching costa; a black transverse line at 1/2, convex outwardly with tendency to form about three dots across wing, outwardly bordered and dotted with metallic silvery markings; a bronzy-brown transverse area at about 3/4 crossed by grey, more definite towards dorsum; a row of metallic silvery dots at 4/5 transversely to reach tornus; outwardly and at apex of wing blackish: cilia grey with black basal and median lines with suffusion of dark fuscous at apex and anal angle, tips whitish. Hindwings dark fuscous, lighter on basal half: cilia grey with dark-fuscous basal and fuscous median lines, tips whitish.

== Distribution ==
This species is endemic to New Zealand and has been observed in Arthur's Pass.

== Behaviour ==
Adults of this species is on the wing in January.
