= George Howes (entomologist) =

New Zealand entomologist

(William) George Howes
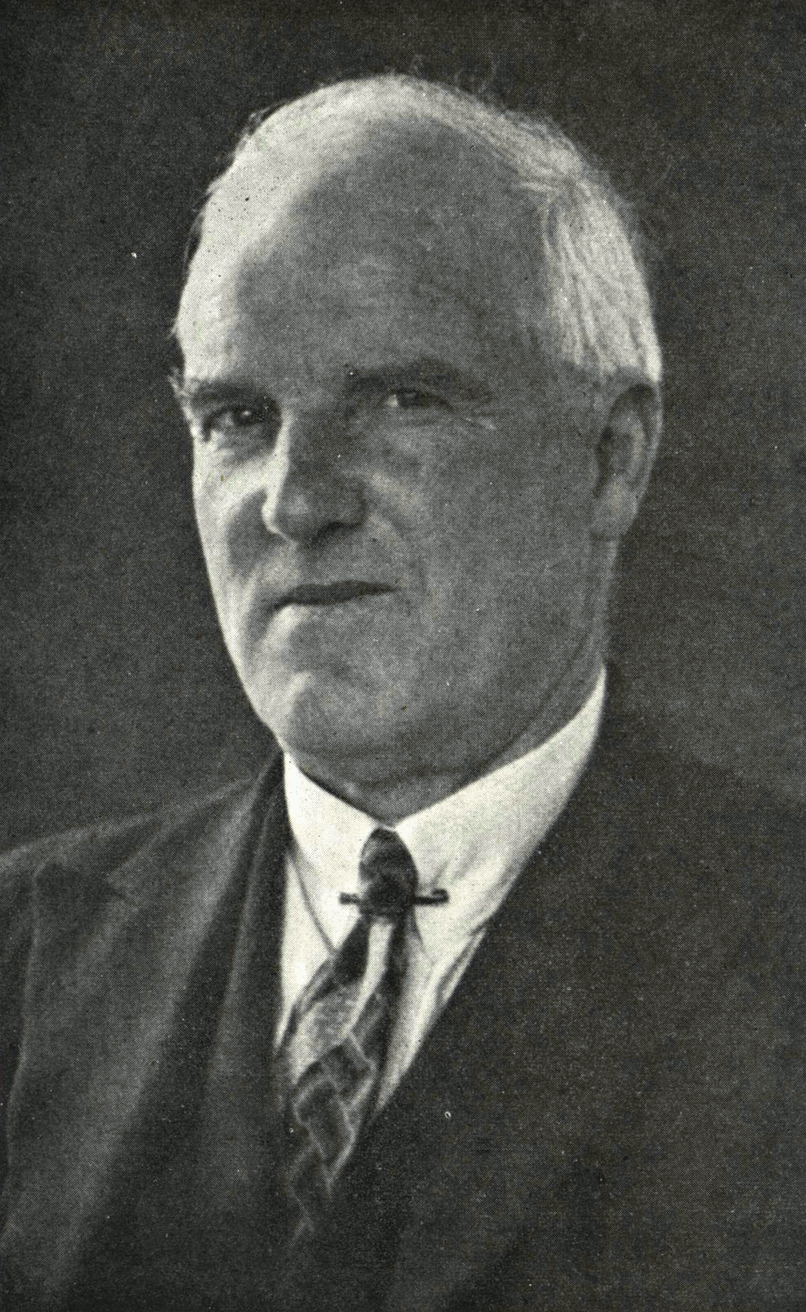
- Born: William George Howes; 4 December 1879; Southbridge, New Zealand
- Died: 20 February 1946 (aged 66); Dunedin, New Zealand
- Resting place: Andersons Bay Cemetery, Dunedin. Block 114. Plot 66
- Scientific career
- Fields: Entomology
- Institutions: G. Howes and Co.; University of Otago
- Author abbrev. (zoology): Howes

William George Howes (4 December 1879 – 20 February 1946) was a New Zealand entomologist and businessman.

== Early life ==
Howes was born in 1879 at Southbridge. He was one of five surviving children of Cecilia Brown and William Howes, a post office clerk and accountant from England. His elder sister Edith, who would become a writer and educationalist, was born in 1872 before the family migrated to New Zealand.

== Career ==
Howes authored scientific papers on entomology, concentrating on New Zealand Lepidoptera, and described numerous species new to science. The species Molophilus howesi was named in his honour.

Howes was a member of a number of organisations including the Royal Entomological Society, Linnean Society of London, American Entomological Society, the Otago Chamber of Commerce, New Zealand Institute, Otago Acclimatisation Society where he sat on the council, and the Dunedin Naturalists Field Club for which he was president for many years. For a quarter of a century, Howes was one of the directors of the Portobello Marine Biological Station.

Owing to his acknowledged entomological expertise, Howes was invited to be part of the 1924 Chatham Islands expedition.

Howes was involved in the planning, establishment and management of the aquarium at the New Zealand and South Seas International Exhibition in 1925 on Logan Park, Dunedin. When this was unable to be funded by the Acclimatisation Society or the City Corporation, Howes and others registered a private company Aquarium Ltd "to carry on the business of an aquarium at the New Zealand and South Seas Exhibition at Dunedin."

== Death ==
Howes died suddenly on 20 February 1946 at Dunedin where he had lived most of his life. He was buried at Andersons Bay Cemetery. He was survived by his wife Beatrice and four children.

== Gallery ==
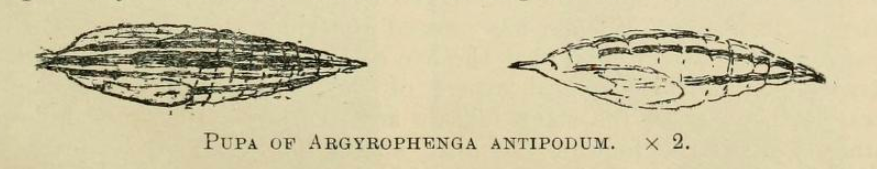
Argyrophenga antipodum

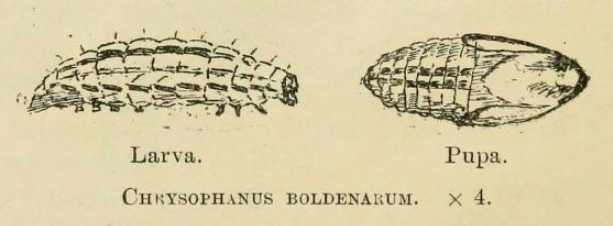
Chrysophanus boldenarum

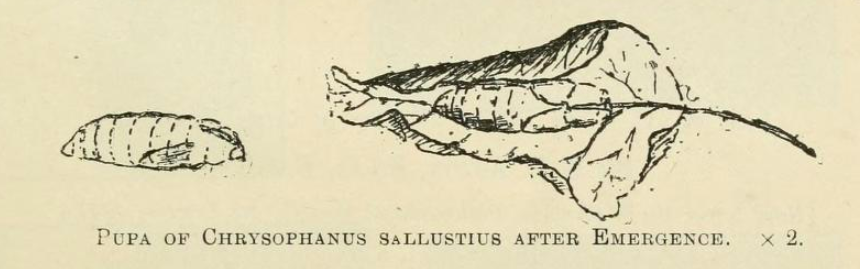
Chrysophanus sallustrius

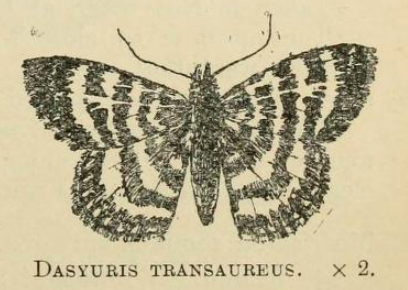
Dasyuris transaureus

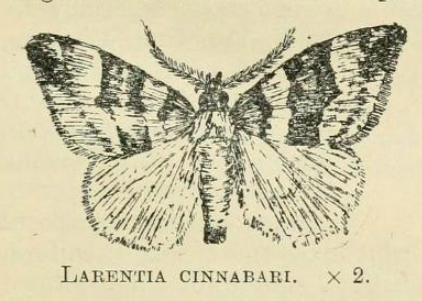
Larentia cinnabari

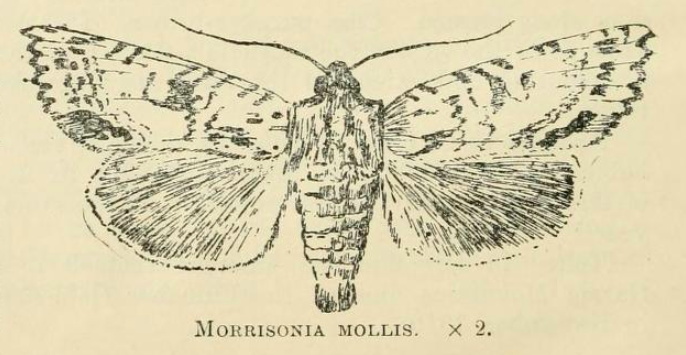
Morrisonia mollis

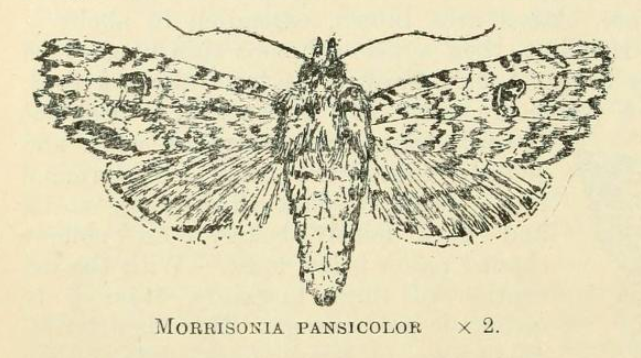
Morrisonia pansicolor

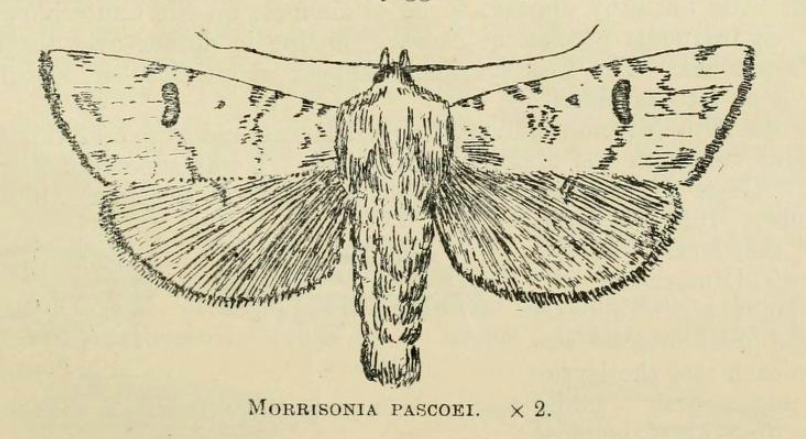
Morrisonia pascoei

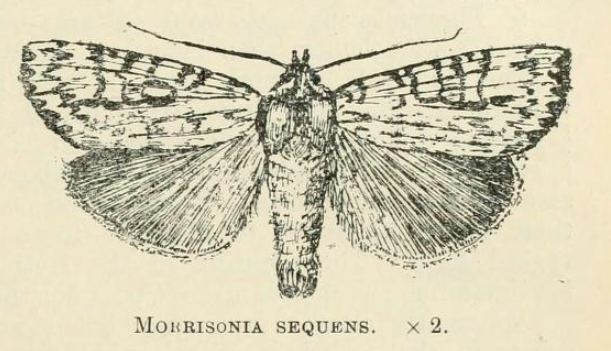
Morrisonia sequens
