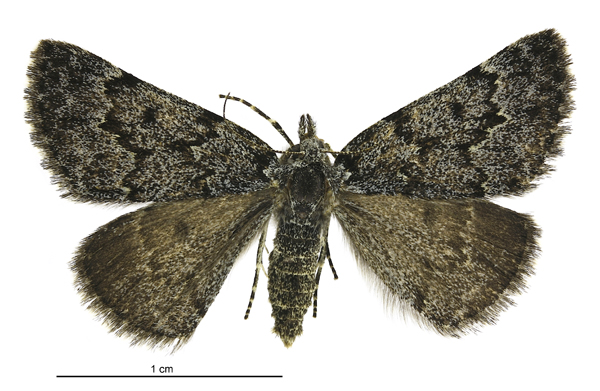
- Female
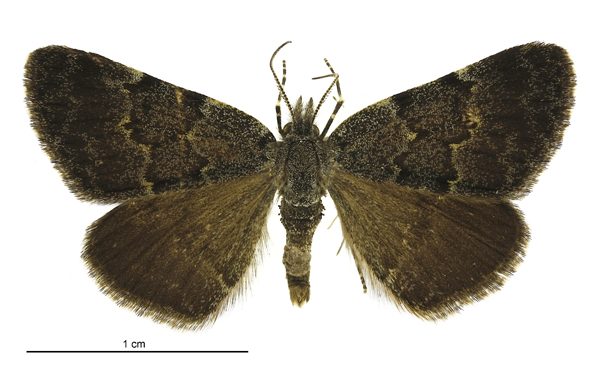
- Male

Scientific classification
- Kingdom: Animalia
- Phylum: Arthropoda
- Clade: Pancrustacea
- Class: Insecta
- Order: Lepidoptera
- Family: Geometridae
- Genus: Dichromodes
- Species: D. niger

Binomial name
- Dichromodes niger (Butler, 1877)

Synonyms
- Cacopsodos niger Butler, 1877; Cacopsodes nigra (Butler, 1877); Dichromodes nigra (Butler, 1887)

= Dichromodes niger =

Species of moth endemic to New Zealand

Dichromodes niger (also known as the alpine lichen looper) is a moth of the family Geometridae. It was described by Arthur Gardiner Butler in 1877. This species is endemic to New Zealand and can be found in the lower part of the South Island and upper half of the North Island. It inhabits rocky sites or forest clearings. The larvae feed on lichen. Adults are day flying, are rapid fliers, and are on the wing from November until January.

== Taxonomy ==
This species was first described by Arthur Gardiner Butler in 1877 using a male specimen collected at Castle Hill by J. D. Enys and named Cacopsodos niger. In 1888 Edward Meyrick place this species within the genus Dichromodes and discussed this species using the name Dichromodes nigra. He compared it to the newly described D. gypsotis stating that D. niger was "markedly larger, blackish, without any white suffusion, the markings obsoletely darker." George Hudson discussed and illustrated this species under the name Cacopsodes nigra in both his 1898 book New Zealand moths and butterflies (Macro-lepidoptera) and his 1928 book The butterflies and moths of New Zealand. In 1988 J. S. Dugdale stated that the species name was Dichromodes niger. Robert J. B. Hoare discussed this species in 2016 and pointed out that the genus Dichromodes was described using Australian species whose larvae feed on the leaves of Myrtaceous plants. He raised the possibility that as D. niger larvae feed on lichens it is possible this species may be misplaced. The male holotype specimen is held at the Natural History Museum, London.

== Description ==
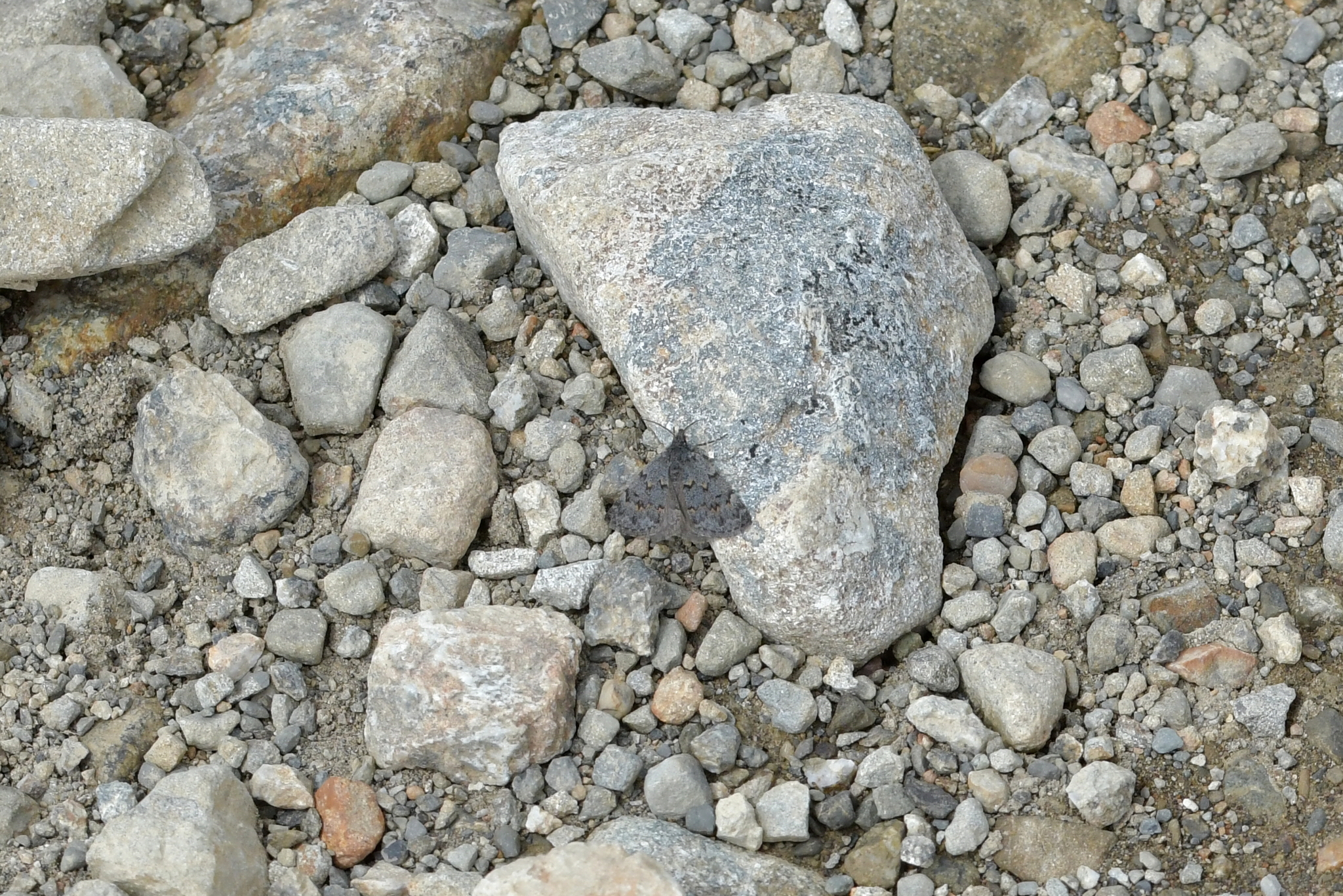
D. niger observed in the Tararua Forest Park.

Butler described this species as follows:

Greyish black, speckled with white scales; primaries crossed by a broad dentated central black band; below shining dark grey, with a continuous paler discal line; pectus black. Expanse of wings 11 lines.

Hudson described this species as follows:

The expansion of the wings is about 7/8 inch. The fore-wings are dull black, finely speckled with white; there is a distinct discal dot; three very jagged black transverse lines, one at the base, one at 1/3 and one at 2/3, followed by a broad broken subterminal shading and a terminal series of elongate black dots. The hind-wings are greyish-black, sometimes strongly tinged with orange-yellow in the female, with one or two dusky bands.

== Distribution ==
It is endemic to New Zealand. This species known in the North Island from the Tararua Range south and also in the upper portion South Island as far south as Arthur's Pass. In the South Island mountains it has been observed at altitudes of between 600m to 1200m. This species has been observed by Hudson around Wellington as well as in Nelson on the Dunn Mountain. It has also been observed at Jack's Pass in Hanmer and Skelmorlie Peak near Lake Te Anau as well as in the Awatere River valley.

== Habitat and hosts ==
The species has been observed inhabiting beech forest in Nelson and frequents forest clearings. The larvae of D. niger feed on lichen.

== Behaviour ==
The larvae of this species writhe and fall to the ground in an evasive movement when they are disturbed. This adults are day flying and are a fast flyers. Adults are on the wing from November to January. Adults frequent forest clearings where they have been observed resting on the ground in strong sunshine.
