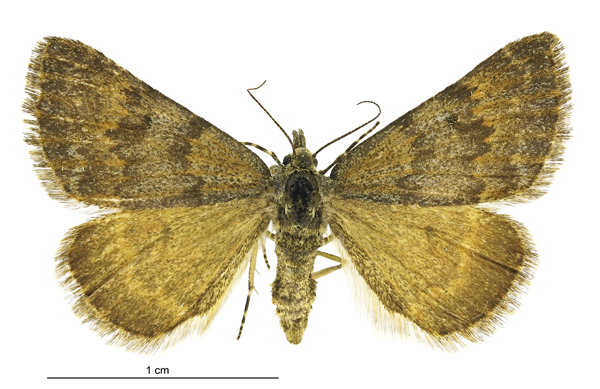
- Female
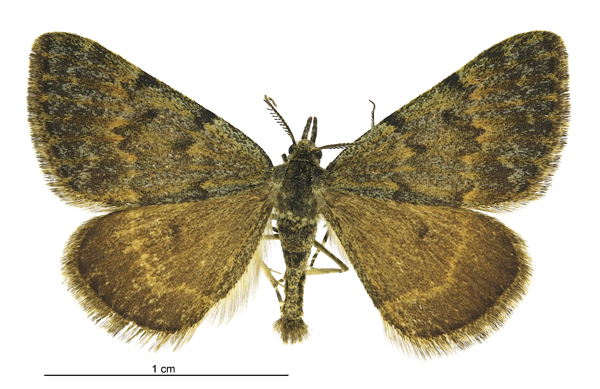
- Male

Scientific classification
- Kingdom: Animalia
- Phylum: Arthropoda
- Class: Insecta
- Order: Lepidoptera
- Family: Geometridae
- Genus: Dichromodes
- Species: D. simulans

Binomial name
- Dichromodes simulans Hudson, 1908

= Dichromodes simulans =

Species of moth endemic to New Zealand

Dichromodes simulans is a moth of the family Geometridae. This species was first described by George Hudson in 1908. It is endemic to New Zealand and is regarded as rarely encountered. It has been observed in Otago including at the type locality of the Old Man Range / Kopuwai to the south of Alexandra, and at the Caleb Chapman Road Scientific Reserve.

== Taxonomy ==
This species was first described by George Hudson in 1908 using specimens collected by J. H. Lewis at Old Man Range, Central Otago, at an altitude of about 4,000 ft. George Hudson described and illustrated this species in his book The butterflies and moths of New Zealand. The syntype specimens are held at Te Papa.

== Description ==
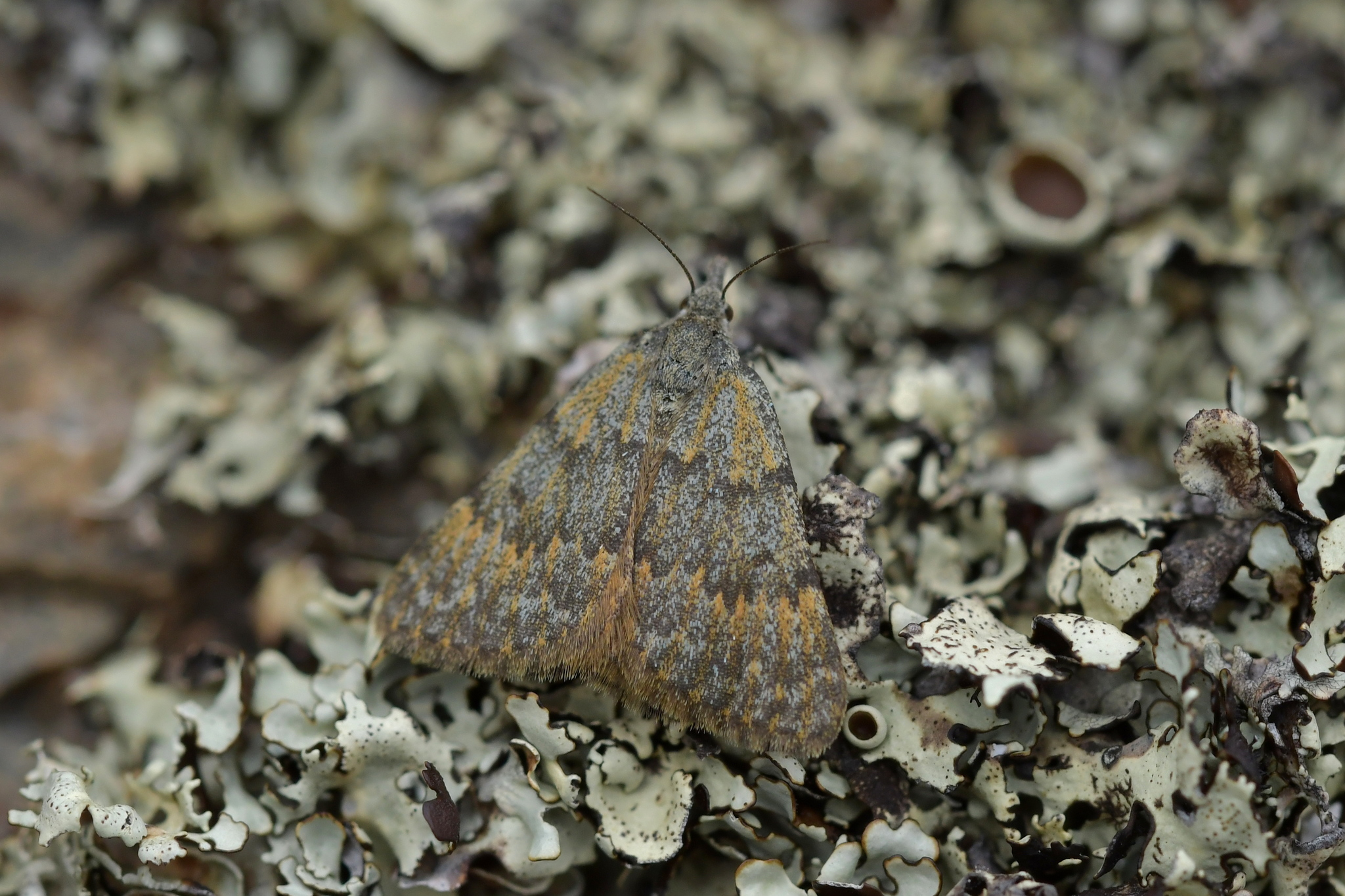
Observation of D. simulans at Caleb Chapman Road Scientific Reserve.

Hudson described this species as follows:

The expansion of the wings is about 7/8 in. The forewings are dull bluish-grey, with two obscure slender yellowish-brown bands; there are three jagged blackish transverse lines, one at 1/4, one near the middle, and one at 3/4; there is a series of black and bluish-grey marks on the termen. The hindwings are yellowish-brown, clouded with dull-brown towards the base and termen, leaving the central portion paler. The cilia of all the wings is yellowish-brown mixed with black.

Hudson pointed out that this species is very similar in appearance to Paranotoreas fulva. However D. simulans can be distinguished as its wings are broader, the transverse lines more indented, and the cilia not strongly barred. The antennae of the male are unipectinated.

== Distribution ==
This species is endemic to New Zealand. D. simulans has been observed in Otago at the Old Man Range and to the south of Alexandra. It has also been observed in the Caleb Chapman Road Scientific Reserve. D. simulans is regarded as rarely encountered.

== Habitat and hosts ==
This species inhabits rocky sites. The larvae that feed on lichens growing on stones in open habitats.

== Behaviour ==
Adults of this species are day flying and are on the wing from October until March.
