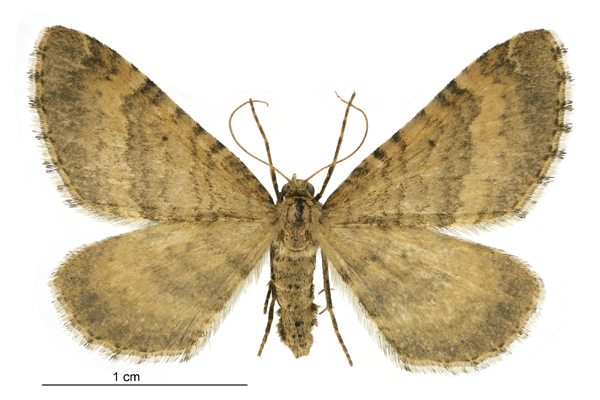
- Female
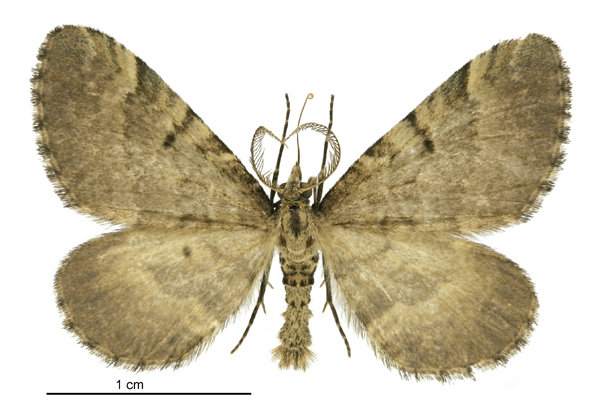
- Male

Scientific classification
- Kingdom: Animalia
- Phylum: Arthropoda
- Clade: Pancrustacea
- Class: Insecta
- Order: Lepidoptera
- Family: Geometridae
- Genus: Asaphodes
- Species: A. aegrota

Binomial name
- Asaphodes aegrota (Butler, 1879)

Synonyms
- Selidosema aegrota Butler, 1879; Larentia aegrota (Butler, 1879); Xanthorhoe aegrota (Butler, 1879)

= Asaphodes aegrota =

Species of moth endemic to New Zealand

Asaphodes aegrota, also known as the dull brown looper, is a species of moth in the family Geometridae. It was first described by Arthur Gardiner Butler in 1879 as Selidosema aegrota. It is endemic to New Zealand and can be found in the North, South and Stewart Islands. This species inhabits open spaces in lowland native forest. The larvae of A. aegrota feed on native herbs and have also been observed feeding of the introduced lawn daisy. The adults are variable in appearance with the markings on both sides of its wings varying in intensity. Some populations also have narrow winged females. Adults are on the wing from November until March.

== Taxonomy ==
This species was first described by Arthur Gardiner Butler in 1879 using specimens collected at Wairarapa by F. W. Hutton and named Selidosema aegrota. George Hudson discussed and illustrated this species under the name Xanthorhoe aegrota in 1898 and again in 1928. In 1939 Louis Beethoven Prout placed this species in the genus Larentia. This placement was not accepted by New Zealand taxonomists. In 1971 John S. Dugdale placed this species in the genus Asaphodes. In 1988 Dugdale confirmed this placement in his catalogue of New Zealand Lepidoptera. The male holotype specimen is held at the Natural History Museum, London.

== Description ==
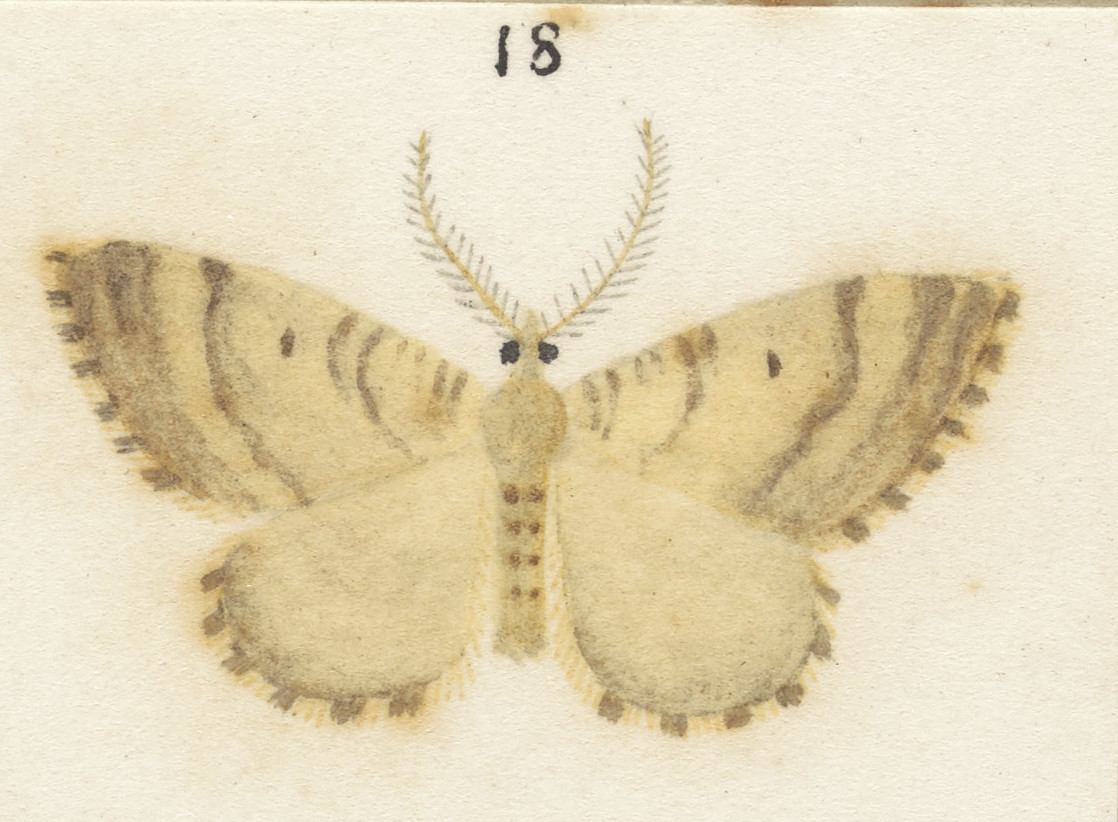
Illustration of male A. aegrota by George Hudson.

Butler originally described this species as follows:

Whity-brown, wings with a marginal series of small blackish spots in pairs; fringe white, spotted with blackish and intersected by a dark grey line; basal two-thirds of the primaries crossed by about seven parallel dusky lines commencing upon the costal margin in black dots; discocellulars black; under surface of primaries greyish-brown with pale grey borders, the costal border crossed by four or five white-edged blackish dashes; marginal spots as above; secondaries white, crossed by about eight strongly arched parallel brown lines which become very indistinct upon the costal area; disc from the radial to the abdominal margin clouded with brown; marginal spots as above; body white.

This species is variable in appearance and the intensity of the markings on both the lower and upper sides of its wings can vary considerably. It also has populations that have narrow winged females such as in the Wairau Valley, Marlborough.

It can be distinguished from the similar appearing Asaphodes abrogata as A. aegrota lacks dark colouration at the outer edge of the forewings.

== Distribution ==
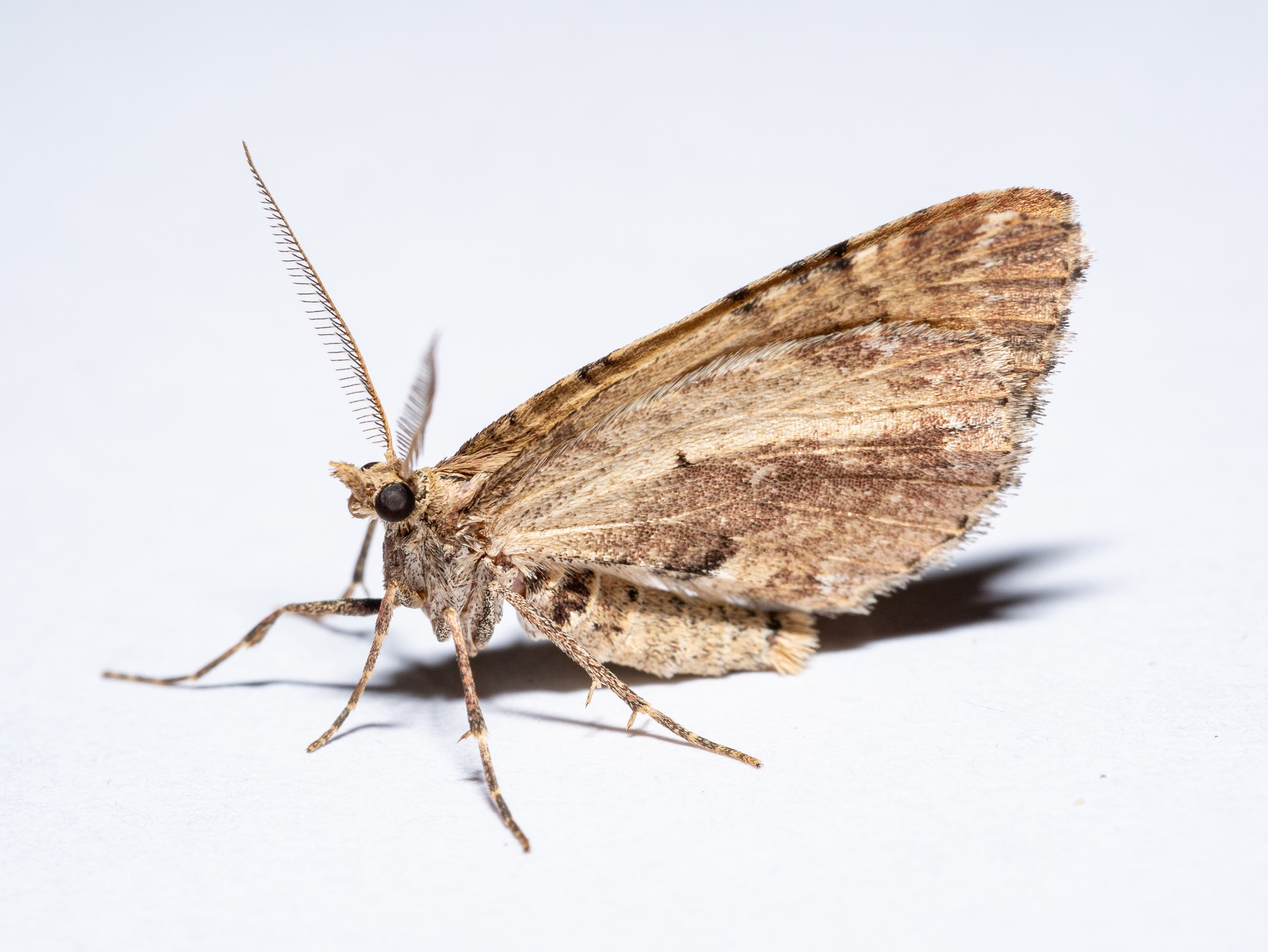
Living male A. aegrota.

This species is endemic to New Zealand and can be found on the North, South and Stewart Islands.

== Habitat ==
This species inhabits open spaces in lowland native forest, tussock grassland as well as scrub. Hudson observed it amongst Discaria toumatou.

== Behaviour ==
The adults of this species are on the wing from November until March. Adults are attracted to light and have been collected via a mercury vapour light trap. Gaskin hypothesised that this species could produce two broods a year but also suggested it might only have one brood with hibernating adults.

== Host species ==
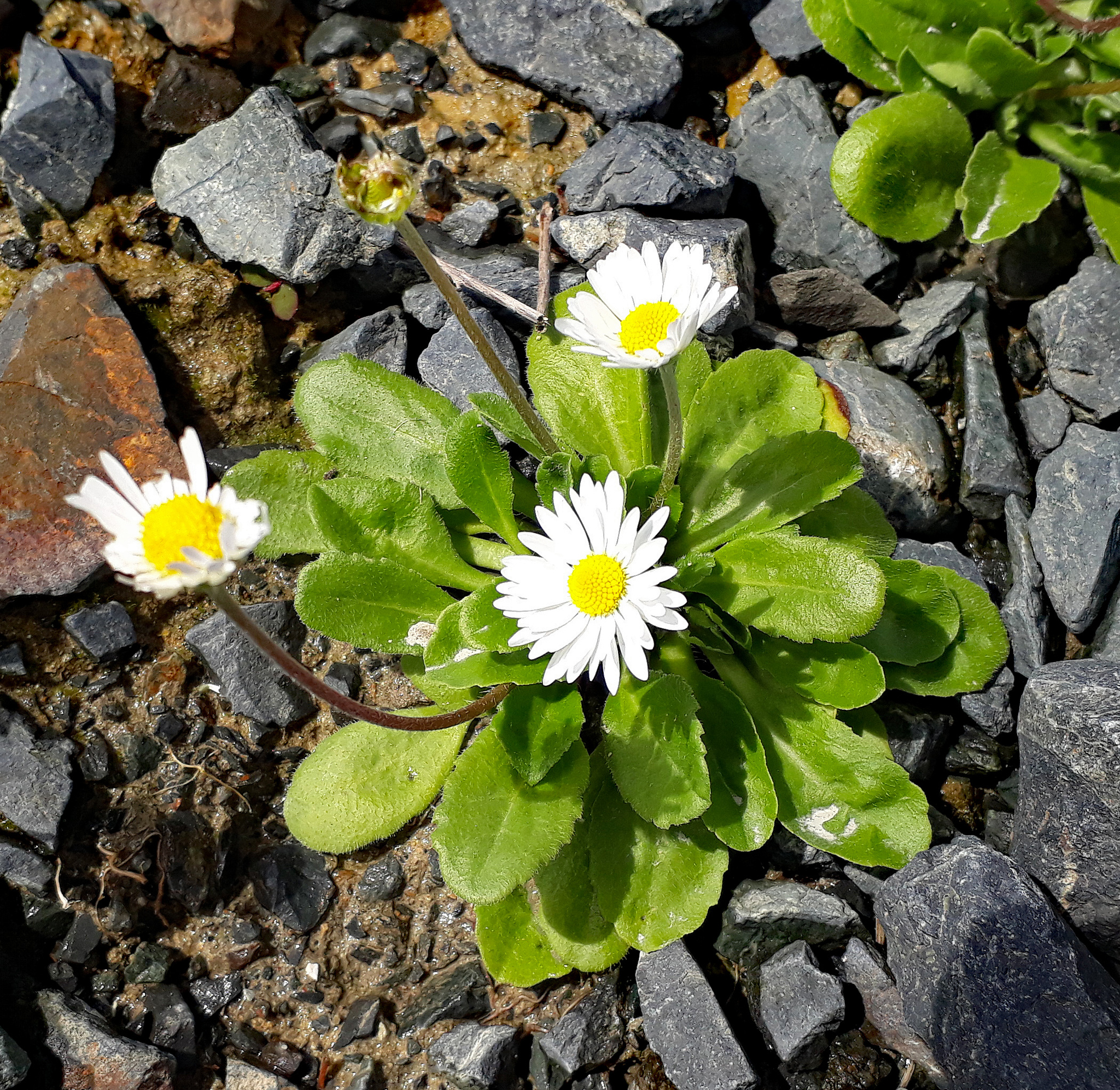
Bellis perennis, an introduced host plant for larvae of A. aegrota.

Larvae of this species feed on herbs. They have also been found feeding on introduced lawn daisies.
