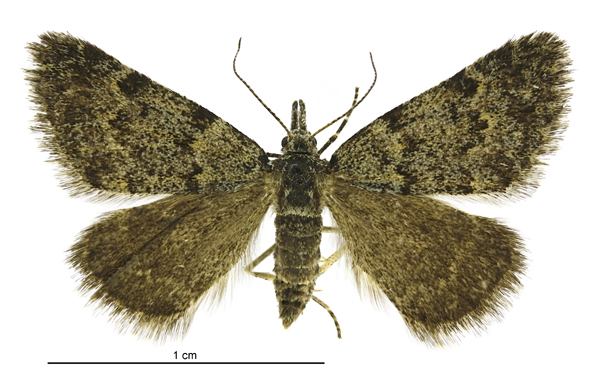
- Female
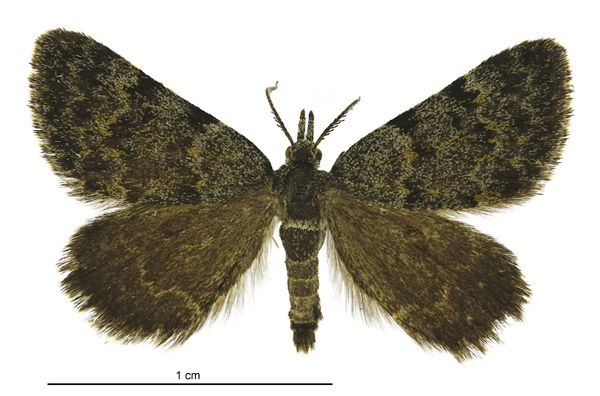
- Male

Scientific classification
- Kingdom: Animalia
- Phylum: Arthropoda
- Class: Insecta
- Order: Lepidoptera
- Family: Geometridae
- Genus: Dichromodes
- Species: D. cynica

Binomial name
- Dichromodes cynica Meyrick, 1911

= Dichromodes cynica =

Species of moth endemic to New Zealand

Dichromodes cynica (also known as the rock face moth) is a moth of the family Geometridae. It was first described by Edward Meyrick in 1911. D. cynica is endemic to New Zealand and is found only around Christchurch and Banks Peninsular. The larvae of D. cynica are cryptic in appearance and feed on lichens growing on dry sunny rock faces. Adults are on the wing from September to February. D. cynica are active during the day and are rapid fliers.

== Taxonomy ==
This species was first described by Edward Meyrick in 1911 using a specimen collected by George Hudson at Lyttelton in November. George Hudson discussed and illustrated this species in his 1928 book The butterflies and moths of New Zealand. The male holotype is held at the Natural History Museum, London.

== Description ==
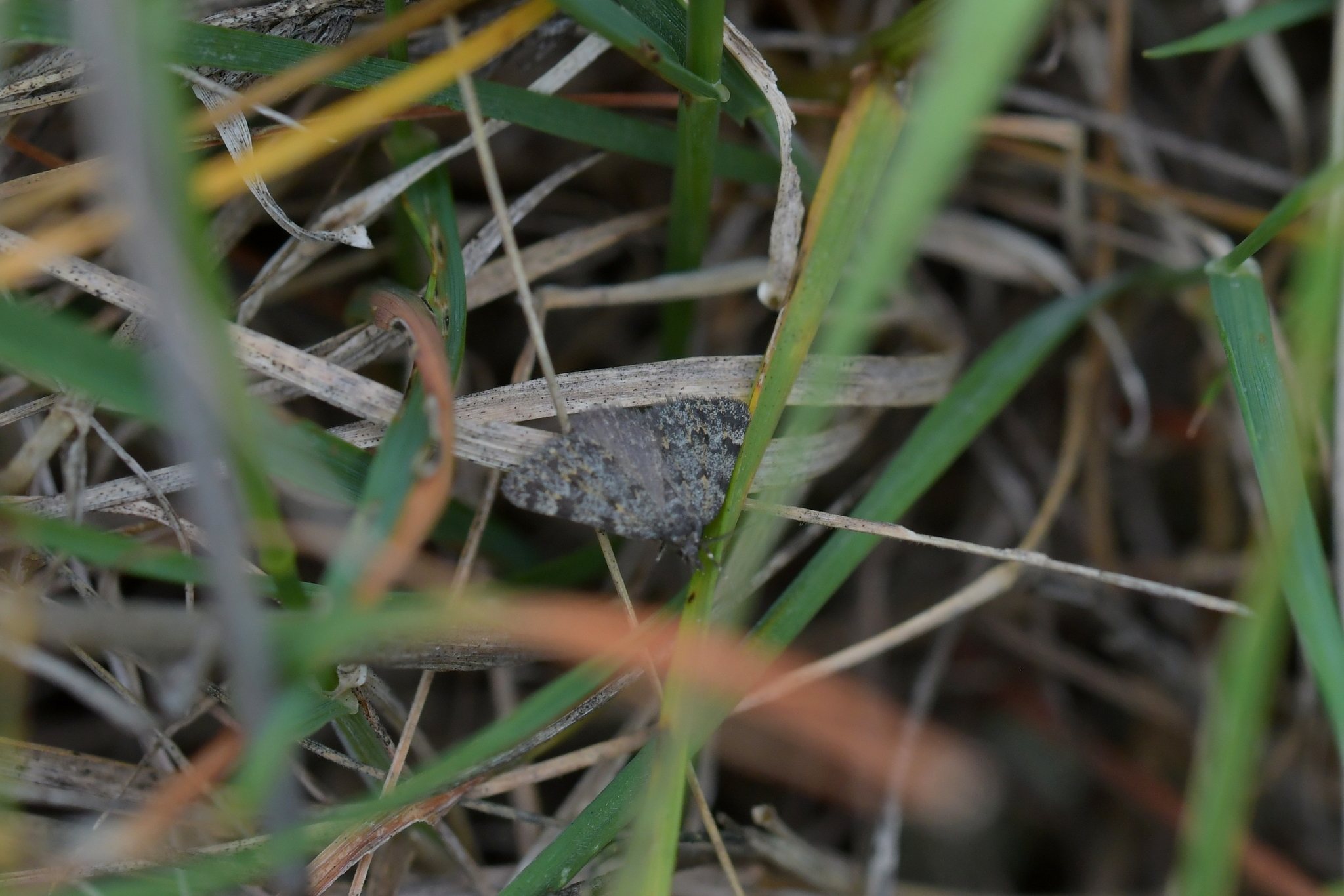
D. cynica at Thomson Scenic Reserve.

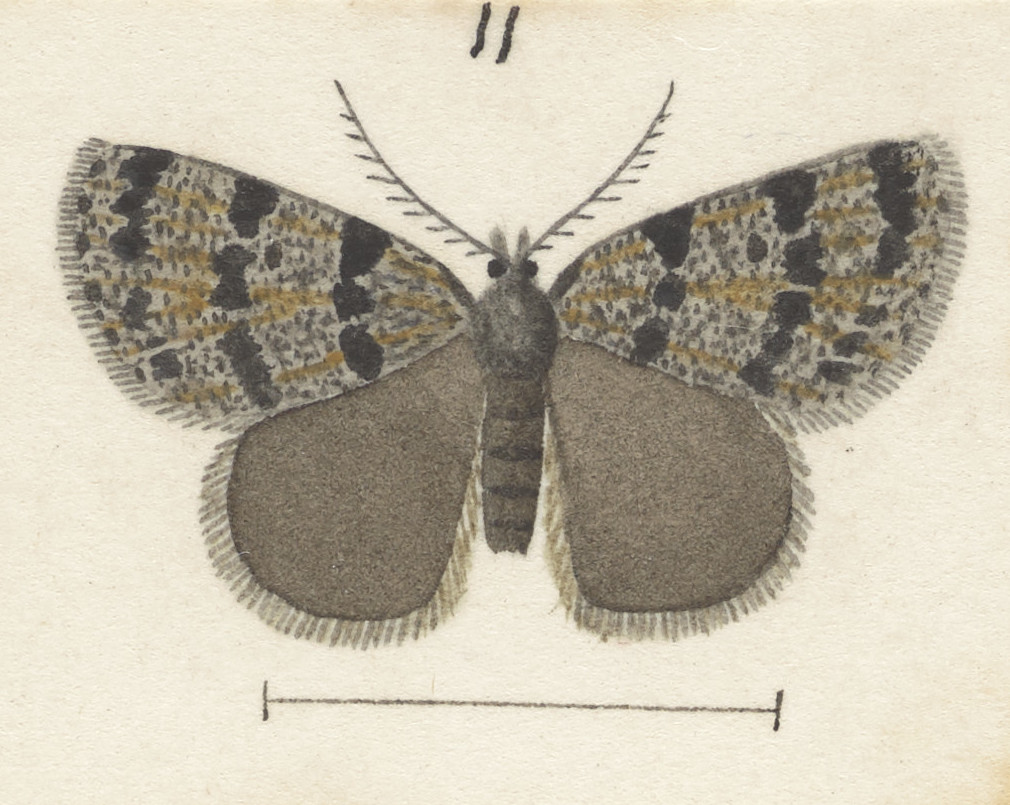
Illustration of male by G. Hudson

The larvae of this species are cryptic, camouflaging themselves against their host species of lichens.

Hudson described the larvae as follows:

The length of the larva was 1/2 inches. Blackish-grey, glacous-grey on sides; large dorsal spots on segments 6 to 9, small dorsal spots on segments 10 to 12, light grey. Body surface covered with minute tubercles and narrow transverse folds.

Meyrick described this species as follows:

♂. 17mm. Head, palpi, thorax, and abdomen blackish-grey, slightly whitish-sprinkled, palpi 3 ½. Antennal pectinations 6. Forewings triangular, costa faintly sinuate, apex rounded-obtuse, termen obliquely rounded; dark grey sprinkled with black and grey-whitish, veins partially suffused with yellow-ochreous irroration; lines obscurely indicated by whitish irroration, irregular, first somewhat sinuate, indented below middle, edged posteriorly with black irroration becoming broad towards costa, second slightly prominent near costa and dorsum, and with a moderate bidentate prominence in middle, edged anteriorly with black irroration also becoming broad towards costa, subterminal hardly traceable; a small blackish transverse discal mark before second line: cilia dark grey, slightly sprinkled with black and whitish. Hindwings with termen rounded; dark fuscous; a fine indistinct grey-whitish curved post-median line, sinuate inwards in middle: cilia dark fuscous.

This species is similar in appearance to D. sphaeriata but is smaller.

== Distribution ==
It is endemic to New Zealand. This species is found only around Christchurch and the Banks Peninsular. As well as the type locality, this species has also been observed at Mount Grey.

== Behaviour ==
The larvae of D. cynica feed on lichens growing on dry sunny rock faces. The adults of this species are on the wing from September to February. This species is active during the day and flies rapidly.
