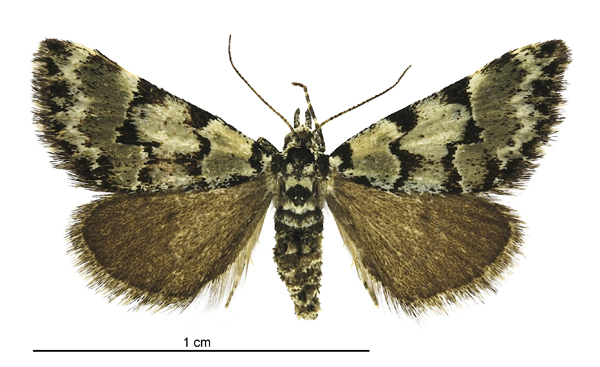
- Female
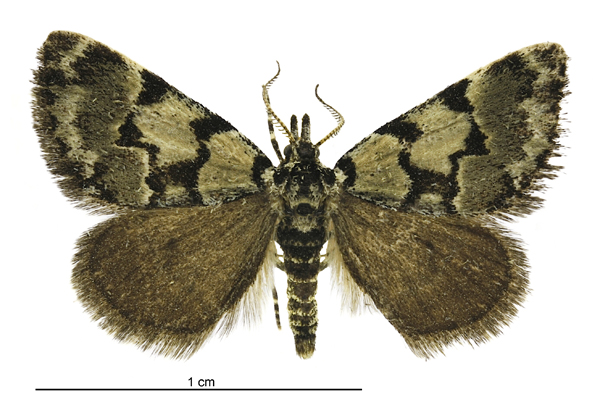
- Male

Scientific classification
- Kingdom: Animalia
- Phylum: Arthropoda
- Class: Insecta
- Order: Lepidoptera
- Family: Geometridae
- Genus: Dichromodes
- Species: D. gypsotis

Binomial name
- Dichromodes gypsotis Meyrick, 1888

= Dichromodes gypsotis =

Species of moth endemic to New Zealand

Dichromodes gypsotis (also known as the marbled lichen carpet moth) is a moth of the family Geometridae. This species was described by Edward Meyrick in 1888. It is endemic to New Zealand and is found in the lower half of the South Island. The species inhabits open rocky sites. The larvae of D. gypsotis feed on lichen. The adults are day flying and are on the wing from October to January.

== Taxonomy ==
This species was first described by Edward Meyrick in 1888. Meyrick had previously described the specimen he used to establish D. gypsotis in 1884 mistakenly thinking he was describing the female of the species Cacopsodos niger. He corrected this error in the 1888 publication recognising it as a new species. George Hudson discussed and illustrated this species in his 1928 book The butterflies and moths of New Zealand. The female holotype specimen, collected by Meyrick at Lake Wakatipu in December at approximate 460m above sea-level, is held at the Natural History Museum, London.

== Description ==
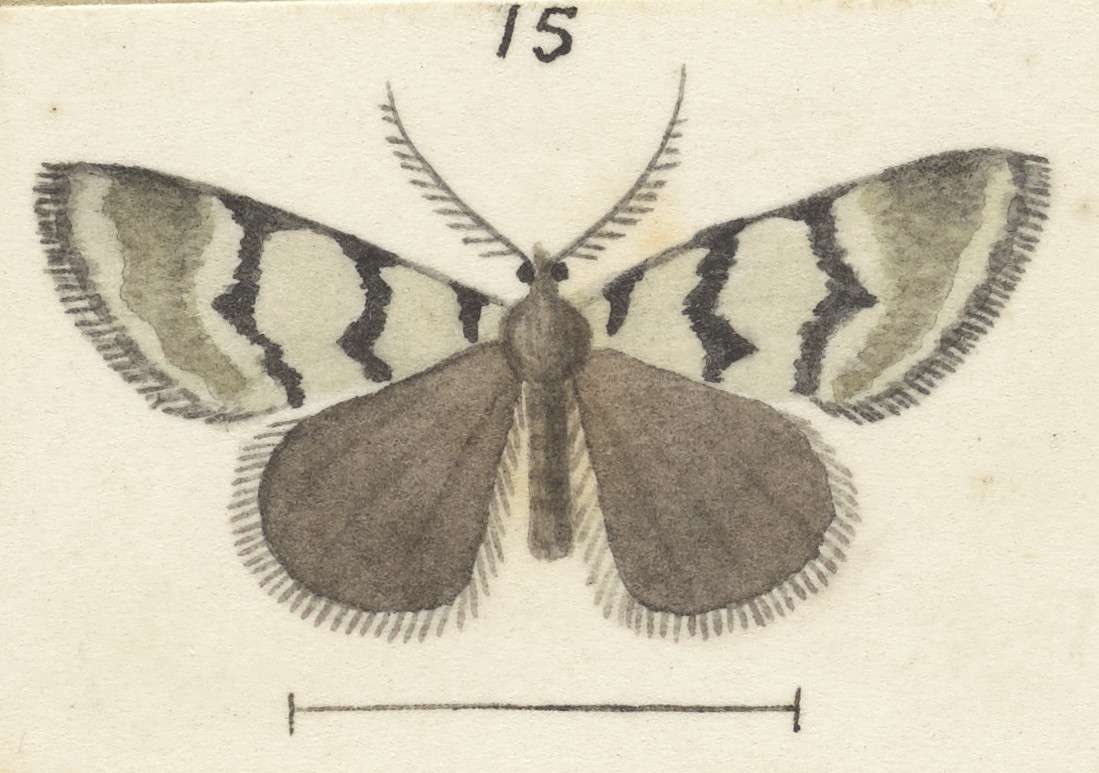
Illustration of adult male by G. Hudson.

The larvae of this species resembles the larvae of D. ida. Alfred Philpott discussed the larvae as follows:

I reared the species from larvae found feeding on lichen. A description of the larva was not secured, but it was of a remarkable character, the margins of each segment being expanded into fimbriated processes, thus imitating the edges of the food-plant.

Meyrick described the adult female of this species as follows:

Female.—13 mm. Forewings rather narrow, costa sinuate, hindmargin sinuate; white, slightly mixed with grey; inner margin narrowly grey; a slender black fascia almost at base; a slender black fascia at ⅓, dentate inwards above middle, dilated on costa; a slender black fascia beyond middle, sharply angulated in middle, dilated on costa, connected below middle with preceding fascia by a suffused bar; close beyond this a rather broad parallel grey fascia; an indistinct grey subterminal line. Hindwings moderate, hindmargin rounded; dark grey.

== Distribution ==
This species is endemic to New Zealand. As well as the type locality of Lake Wakatipu D. gypostis has been observed at Poolburn, Central Otago, at Jacks Pass in Hanmer, Mount Grey, Aoraki / Mount Cook, and in the Takitimo Mountains.

== Habitat and hosts ==
This species inhabits open rocky sites in Otago and Southland. The larvae of D. gypsotis feed on lichens.

== Behaviour ==
The adults of this species is day flying. They are on the wing from October until January.
