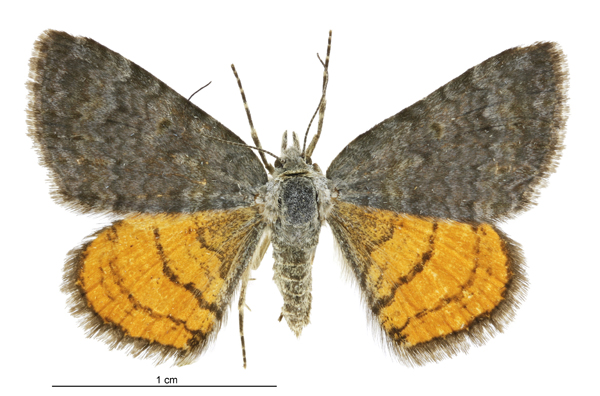
- Female
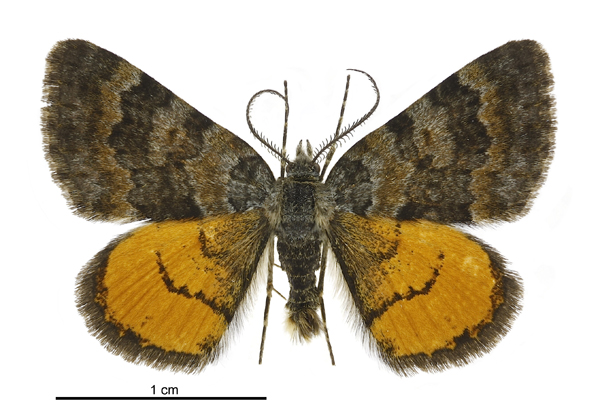
- Male

Scientific classification
- Kingdom: Animalia
- Phylum: Arthropoda
- Clade: Pancrustacea
- Class: Insecta
- Order: Lepidoptera
- Family: Geometridae
- Genus: Paranotoreas
- Species: P. zopyra

Binomial name
- Paranotoreas zopyra (Meyrick, 1883)

Synonyms
- Pasithea zopyra Meyrick, 1883; Notoreas zopyra (Meyrick, 1883)

= Paranotoreas zopyra =

Species of moth endemic to New Zealand

Paranotoreas zopyra is a species of moth in the family Geometridae. This species is endemic to New Zealand. This species was first described by Edward Meyrick in 1883 and named Pasithea zopyra. In 1986 Robin C. Craw placed this species within the genus Paranotoreas.
