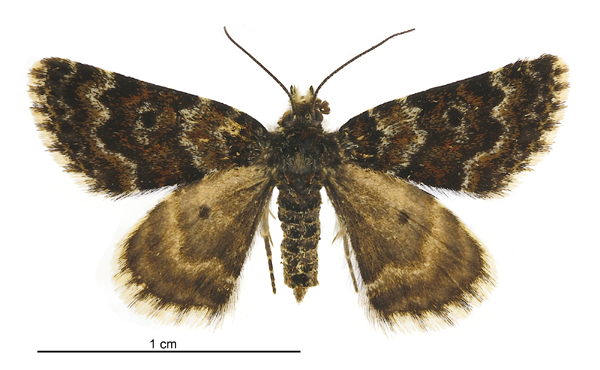
- Female
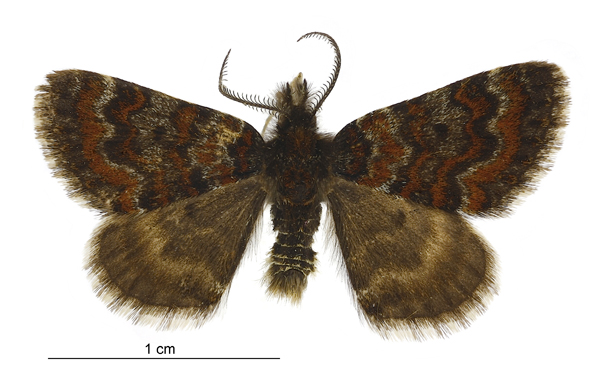
- Male

Scientific classification
- Kingdom: Animalia
- Phylum: Arthropoda
- Clade: Pancrustacea
- Class: Insecta
- Order: Lepidoptera
- Family: Geometridae
- Genus: Paranotoreas
- Species: P. opipara

Binomial name
- Paranotoreas opipara (Philpott, 1915)

Synonyms
- Notoreas opipara Philpott, 1915

= Paranotoreas opipara =

Species of moth endemic to New Zealand

Paranotoreas opipara is a species of moth in the family Geometridae. This species is endemic to New Zealand. This species was first described by Alfred Philpott in 1915 and named Notoreas opipara. In 1986 Robin C. Craw placed this species within the genus Paranotoreas.
