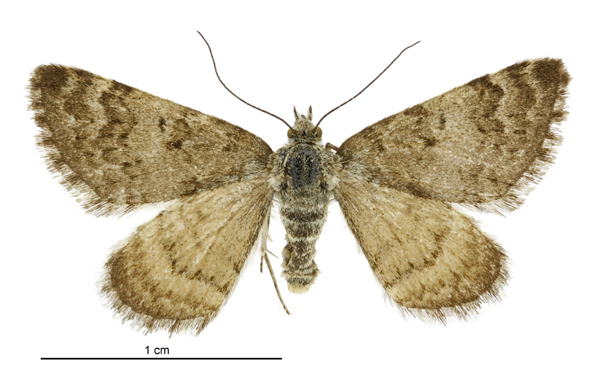
- Female
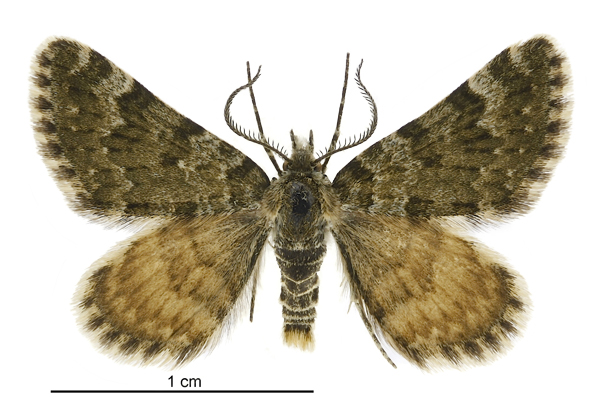
- Male

Conservation status
- Relict (NZ TCS)

Scientific classification
- Kingdom: Animalia
- Phylum: Arthropoda
- Clade: Pancrustacea
- Class: Insecta
- Order: Lepidoptera
- Family: Geometridae
- Genus: Paranotoreas
- Species: P. fulva

Binomial name
- Paranotoreas fulva (Hudson, 1905)

Synonyms
- Lythria fulva Hudson, 1905; Notoreas fulva (Hudson, 1905)

= Paranotoreas fulva =

Species of moth endemic to New Zealand

Paranotoreas fulva is a species of moth in the family Geometridae. This species is endemic to New Zealand and is found in the southern half of the South Island. The preferred habitat of this species are the salt pans of Otago, the mountainous grassland areas in South Canterbury and Otago and the glacial outwash terraces south of Tekapo. The larvae feed on Atriplex buchananii and Plantago coronopus. Adults are day flying and have been recorded as being on the wing in March, October and December. P. fulva is classified as "At Risk, Relict" by the Department of Conservation.

== Taxonomy ==
This species was first described and illustrated by George Vernon Hudson in 1905 and was given the name Lythria fulva. Hudson used a specimen collected at about 3500 ft at Wedderburn, Central Otago by J. H. Lewis. Hudson discussed and illustrated this species in his 1928 book The Butterflies and Moths of New Zealand under the name Notoreas fulva. In 1986 Robin C. Craw proposed placing this species within the genus Paranotoreas. The lectotype specimen, collected at Wedderburn, is held at the Museum of New Zealand Te Papa Tongarewa.

== Description ==
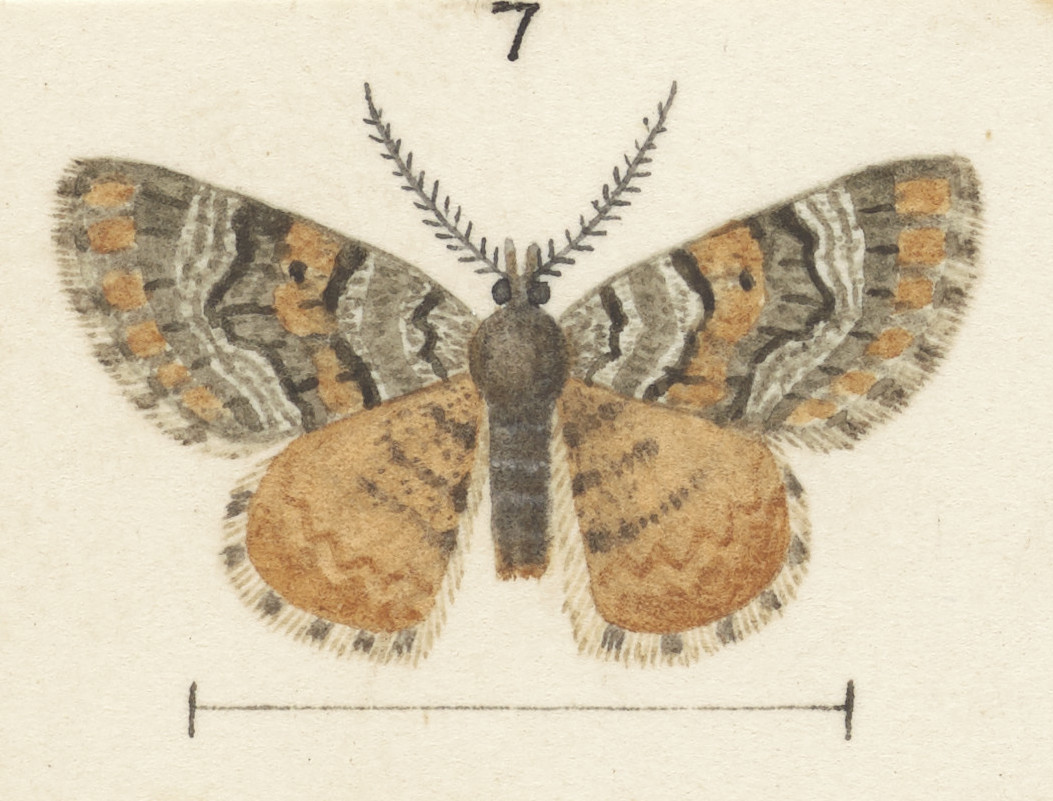
Illustration by George Hudson.

Hudson described the species as follows:

The expansion of the wings is 3/4in. The fore wings are dull grey-ish brown, greenish-tinged. There is a wavy darker band near the base; a broad median band with a strong rounded projection towards the terman above middle; a dull greenish band on termen preceded by row of pale dots on veins, cilia grey with blackish bars. The hind wings are dull reddish-ochreous. There are three very obscure blackish transverse lines. The cilia are grey, faintly barred with darker.

This species varies in depth of colouring on its fore and hind wings with some female specimens being extremely pale and having forewings that are coloured reddish-ochreous.

== Distribution ==
This species is endemic to New Zealand. As well as the type locality, this species has also been found in Alexandra. P. fulva also occurs in the Manorburn Ecological District, as well as at Pisa Flats, Chapman Road Scientific Reserve, Springvale Junction, Moa Creek and other sites in Otago and South Canterbury.

== Life cycle and behaviour ==
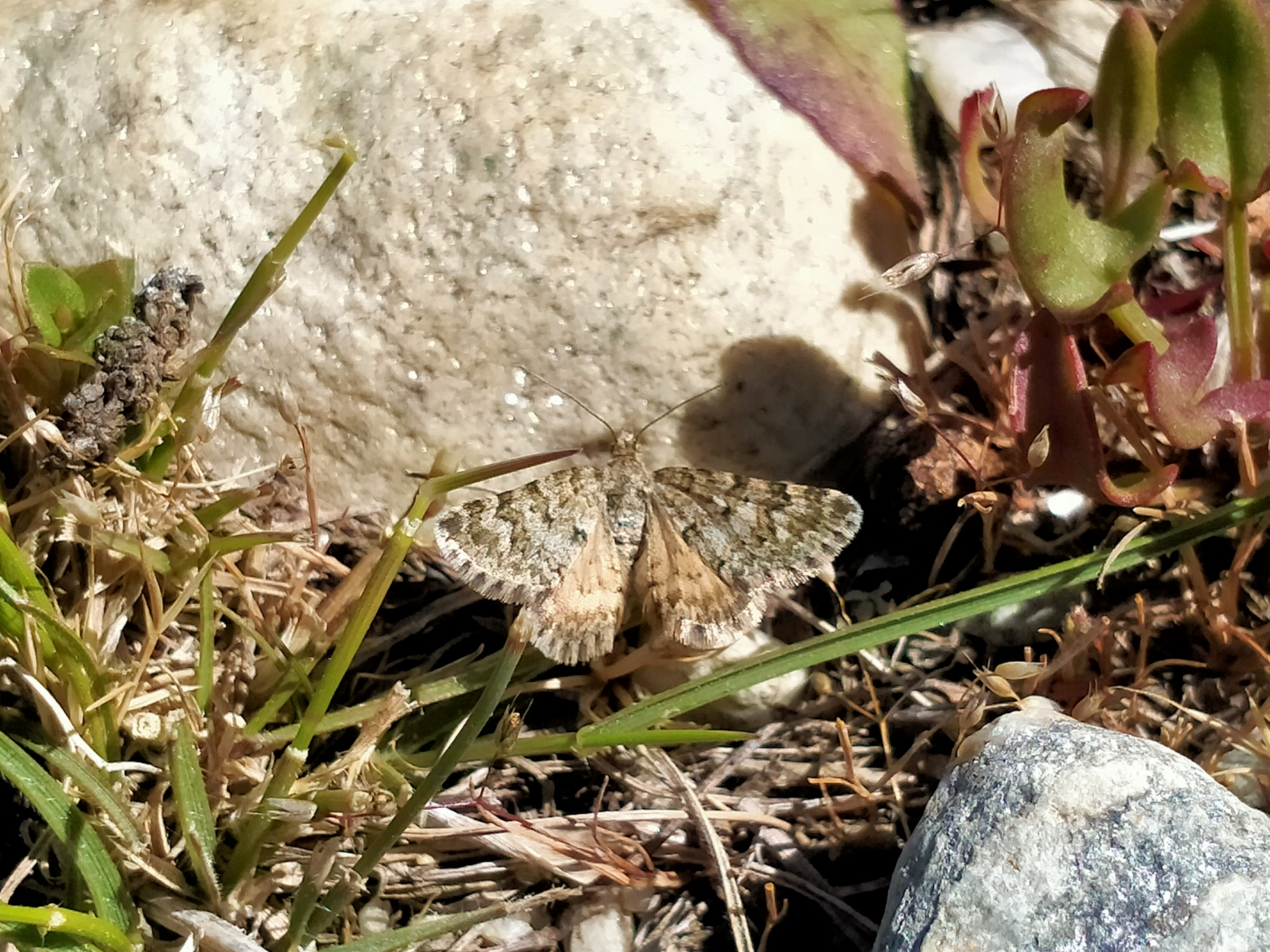
Observation of live P. fulva.

The adults of this species are day flying. Adults have been recorded on the wing in March, October and December. They are known to sunbath on the bare salt pan soil of their favoured habitat.

== Habitat and host species ==
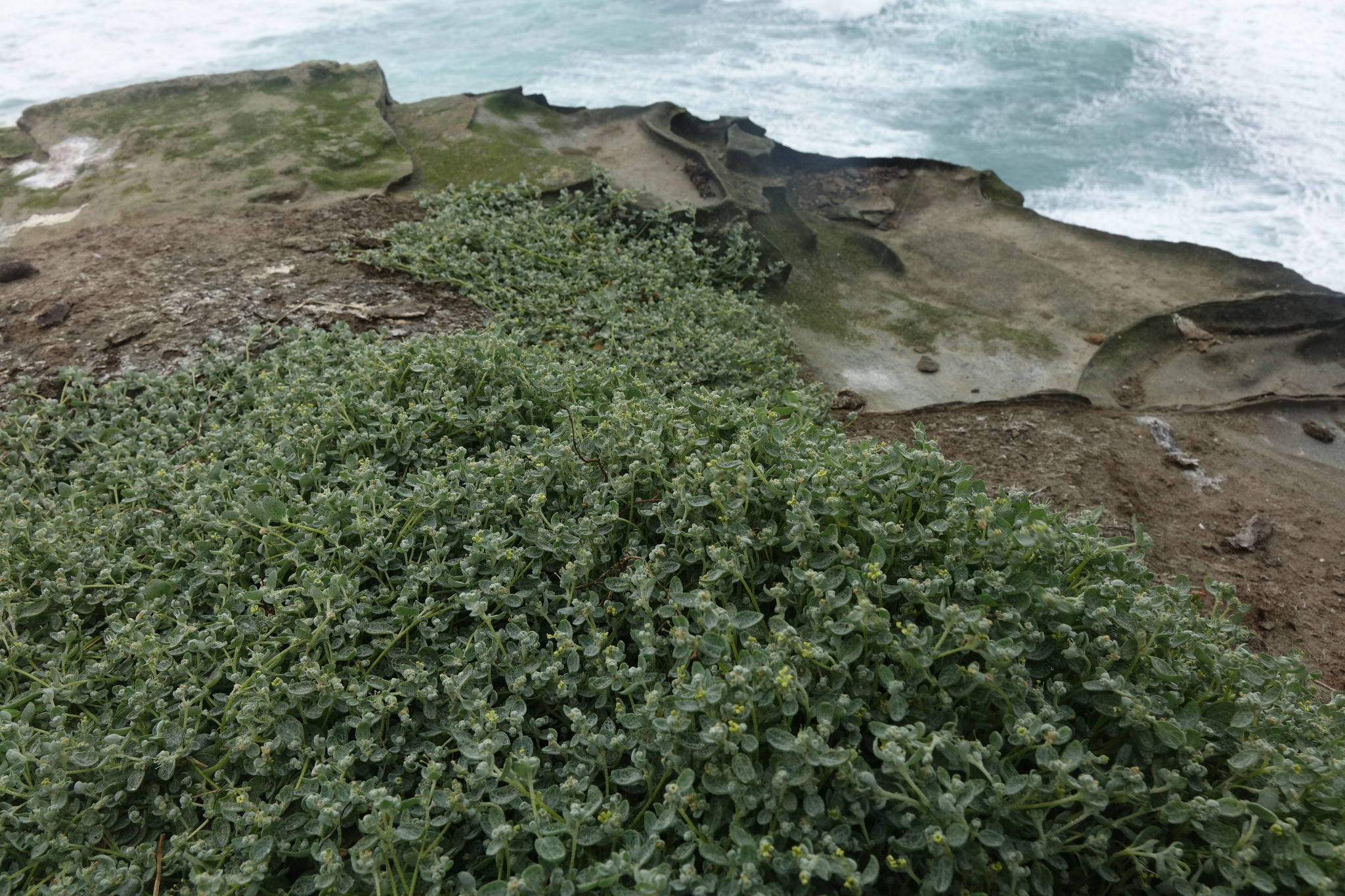
Atriplex buchananii, larval host species of P. fulva.

This species occurs in the salt pans of Otago, as well as at tussock grassland areas of montane South Canterbury. This species has also been collected on glacial outwash terraces south of Tekapo. Atriplex buchananii and Plantago coronopus have been recorded as the larval host plants of this species. At degraded sites the larvae of this species have adapted to consume exotic herbs. Larvae of P. fulva have been reared on Stellaria gracilenta and species in the genera Crepis and Hieracium.

== Conservation status ==
This moth is classified under the New Zealand Threat Classification system as being "At Risk, Relict". This species is under threat as a result of loss of habitat upon which it relies.
