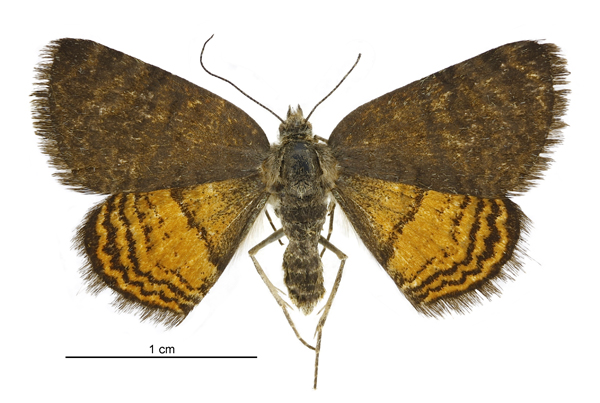
- Female
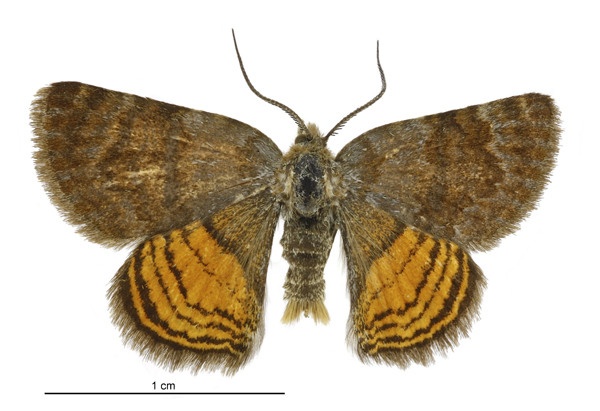
- Male

Scientific classification
- Kingdom: Animalia
- Phylum: Arthropoda
- Clade: Pancrustacea
- Class: Insecta
- Order: Lepidoptera
- Family: Geometridae
- Genus: Paranotoreas
- Species: P. ferox

Binomial name
- Paranotoreas ferox (Butler, 1877)

Synonyms
- Fidonia ferox Butler, 1877; Notoreas ferox (Butler, 1877)

= Paranotoreas ferox =

Species of moth endemic to New Zealand

Paranotoreas ferox is a species of moth in the family Geometridae. This species is endemic to New Zealand. This species was first described by Arthur Gardiner Butler in 1877 and named Fidonia ferox. In 1986 Robin C. Craw placed this species within the genus Paranotoreas.
