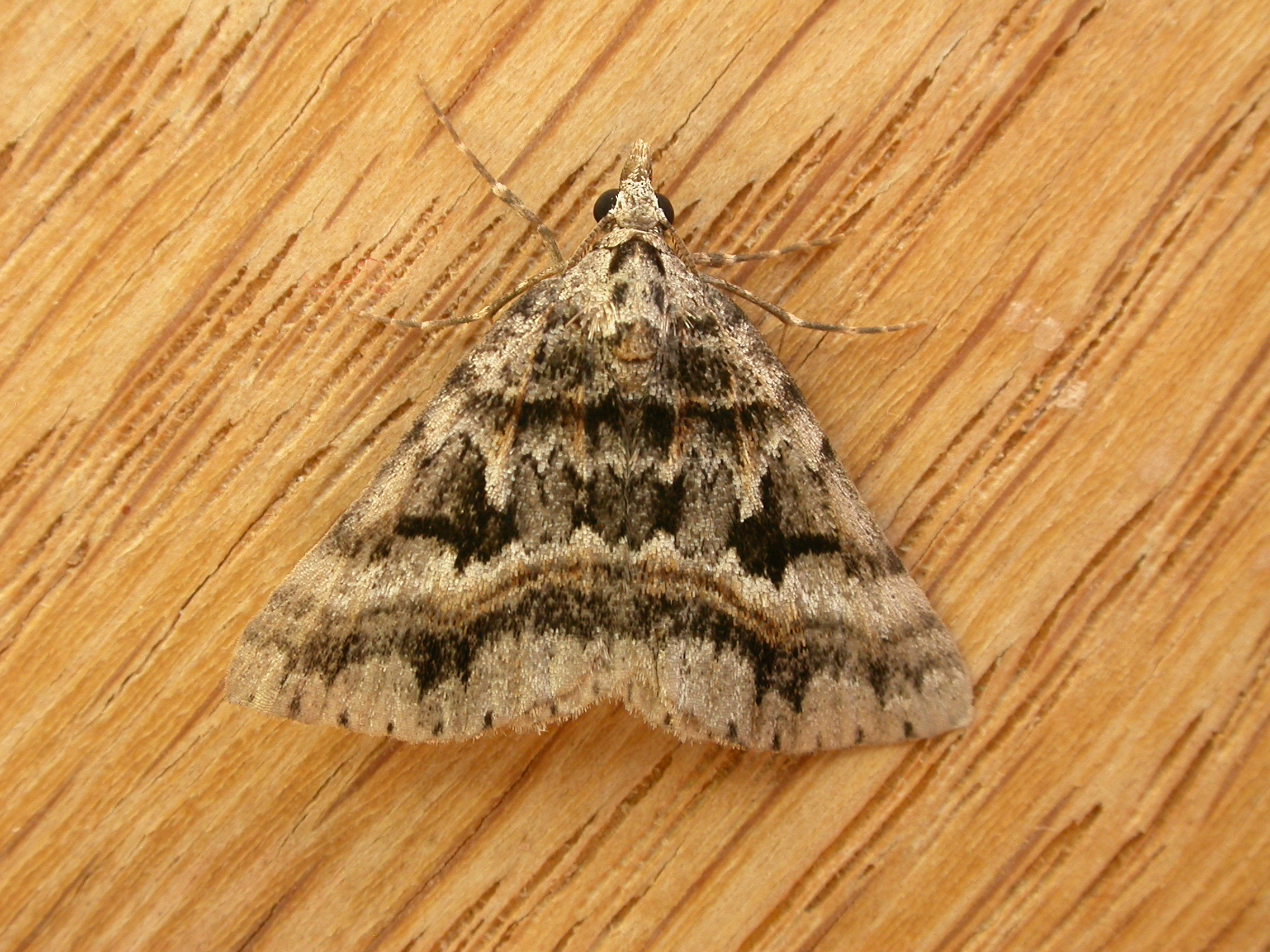

Scientific classification
- Kingdom: Animalia
- Phylum: Arthropoda
- Clade: Pancrustacea
- Class: Insecta
- Order: Lepidoptera
- Family: Geometridae
- Genus: Dichromodes
- Species: D. longidens

Binomial name
- Dichromodes longidens L.B. Prout, 1910

Synonyms
- Dichromodes exocha L.B. Prout, 1916; Dichromodes phaeostropha Turner, 1926

= Dichromodes longidens =

Species of moth

Dichromodes longidens is a moth of the family Geometridae. It is known from Australia.
