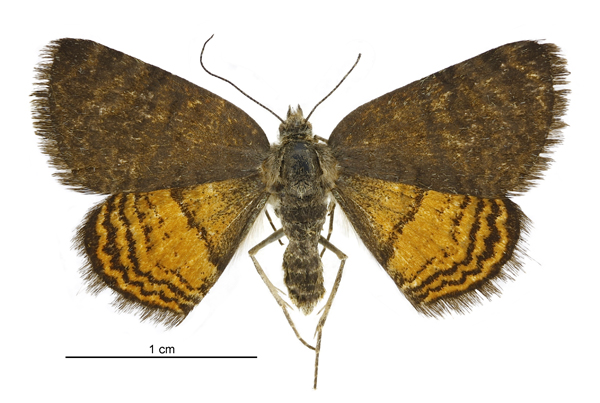

Scientific classification
- Kingdom: Animalia
- Phylum: Arthropoda
- Clade: Pancrustacea
- Class: Insecta
- Order: Lepidoptera
- Family: Geometridae
- Genus: Paranotoreas; Craw, 1986

= Paranotoreas =

Genus of moths

Paranotoreas is a genus of moths in the family Geometridae. It was described by Robin C. Craw in 1986.

== Species ==
Species in this genus include:

- Paranotoreas brephosata (Walker, 1862)
- Paranotoreas ferox (Butler, 1877)
- Paranotoreas fulva (Hudson, 1905)
- Paranotoreas opipara (Philpott, 1915)
- Paranotoreas zopyra (Meyrick, 1883)
