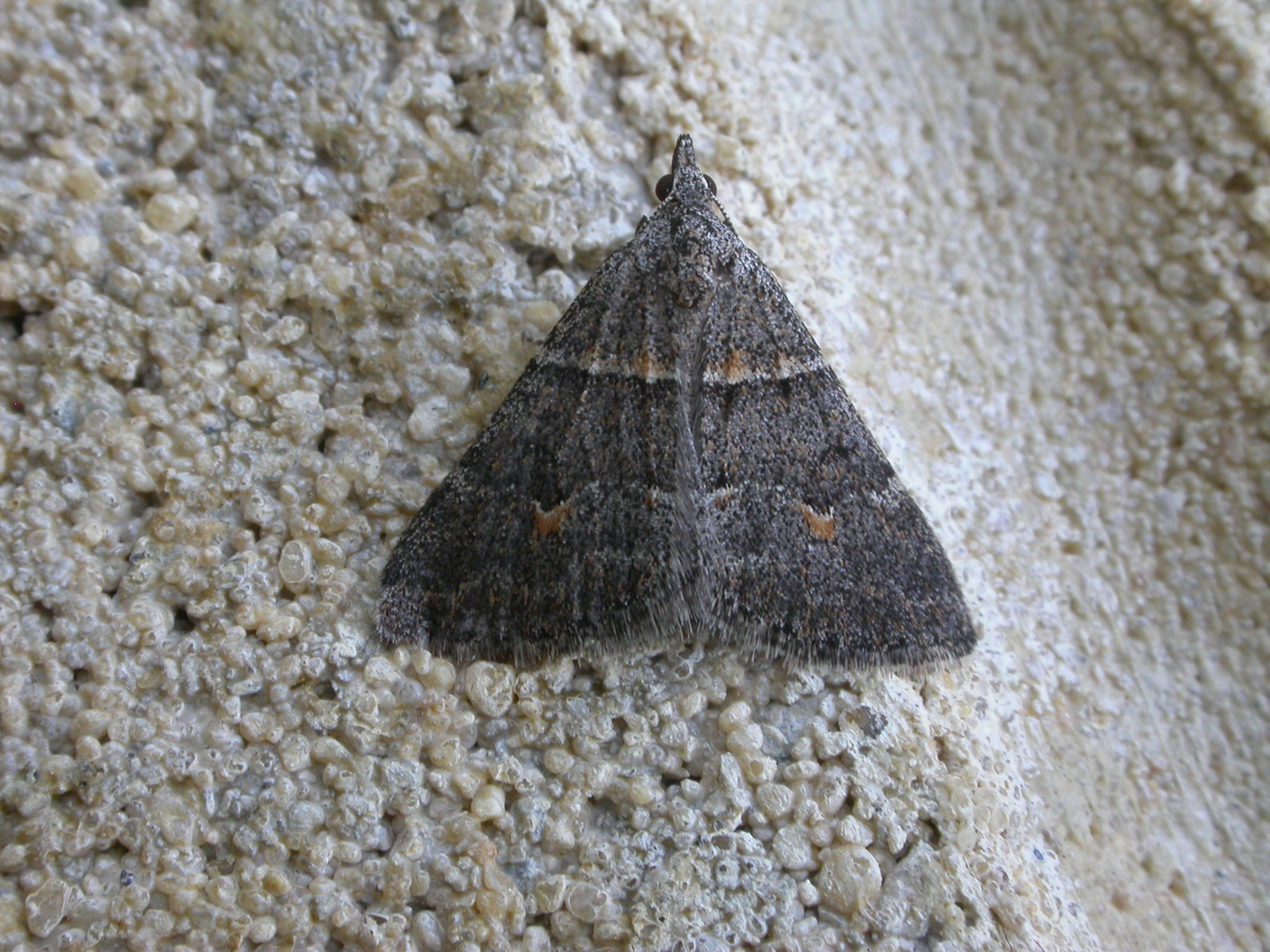

Scientific classification
- Kingdom: Animalia
- Phylum: Arthropoda
- Class: Insecta
- Order: Lepidoptera
- Family: Geometridae
- Genus: Dichromodes
- Species: D. atrosignata

Binomial name
- Dichromodes atrosignata Walker, 1861

Synonyms
- Panagra atrosignata Walker, 1861; Eubolia linda Butler, 1882

= Dichromodes atrosignata =

Species of moth

Dichromodes atrosignata is a species moth of the family Geometridae first described by Francis Walker in 1861. It is found in northern Australia.
