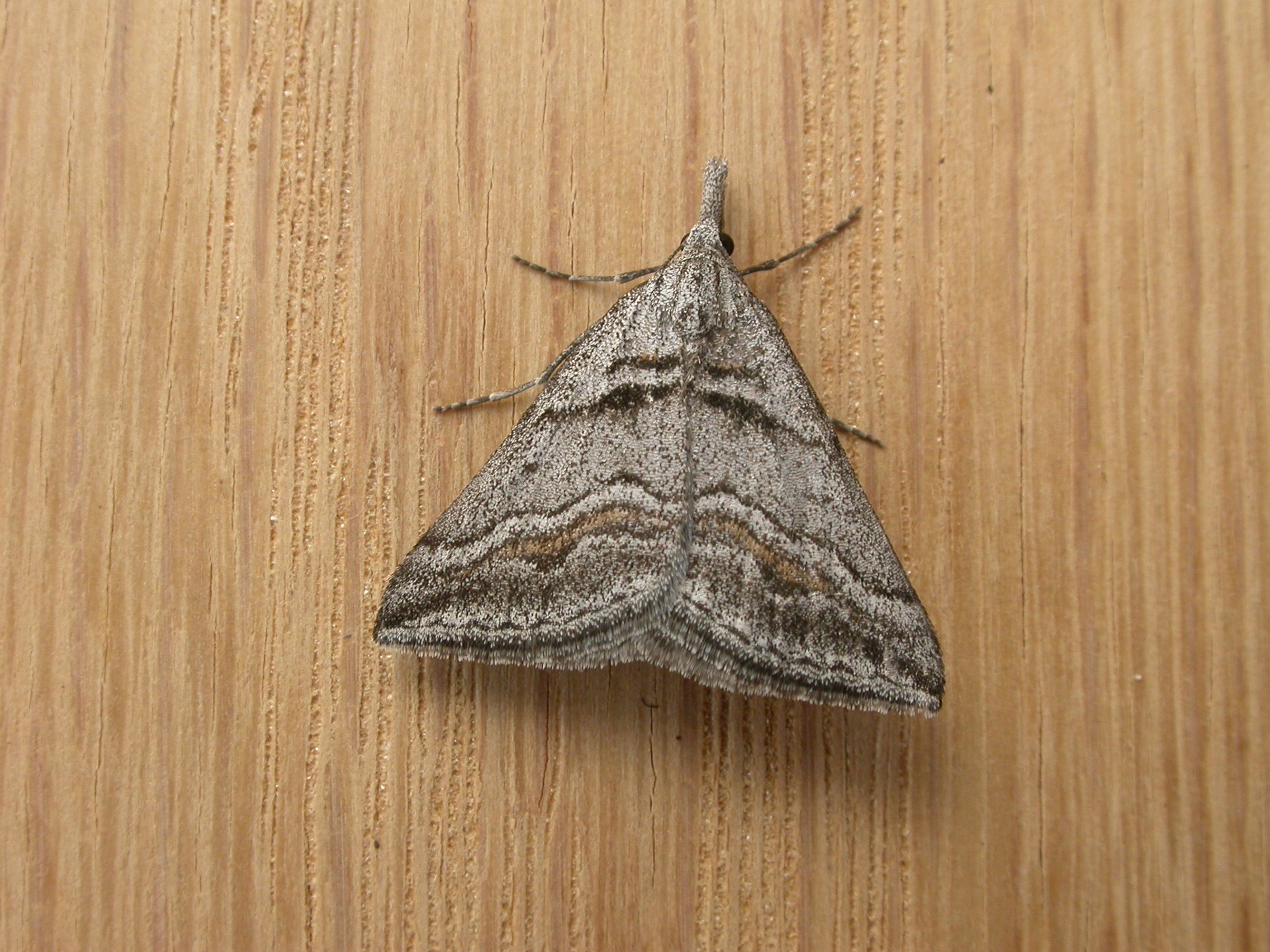

Scientific classification
- Kingdom: Animalia
- Phylum: Arthropoda
- Class: Insecta
- Order: Lepidoptera
- Family: Geometridae
- Genus: Dichromodes
- Species: D. consignata

Binomial name
- Dichromodes consignata Walker, 1861

= Dichromodes consignata =

Species of moth

Dichromodes consignata is a moth of the family Geometridae. It is found in Australia.They are grayish brown with brown hindwings. They have wavy submarginal lines on each forewing. With their wings measuring 3 cm. Females have thread-like antenna while males have a feather-like fringe on one side.
