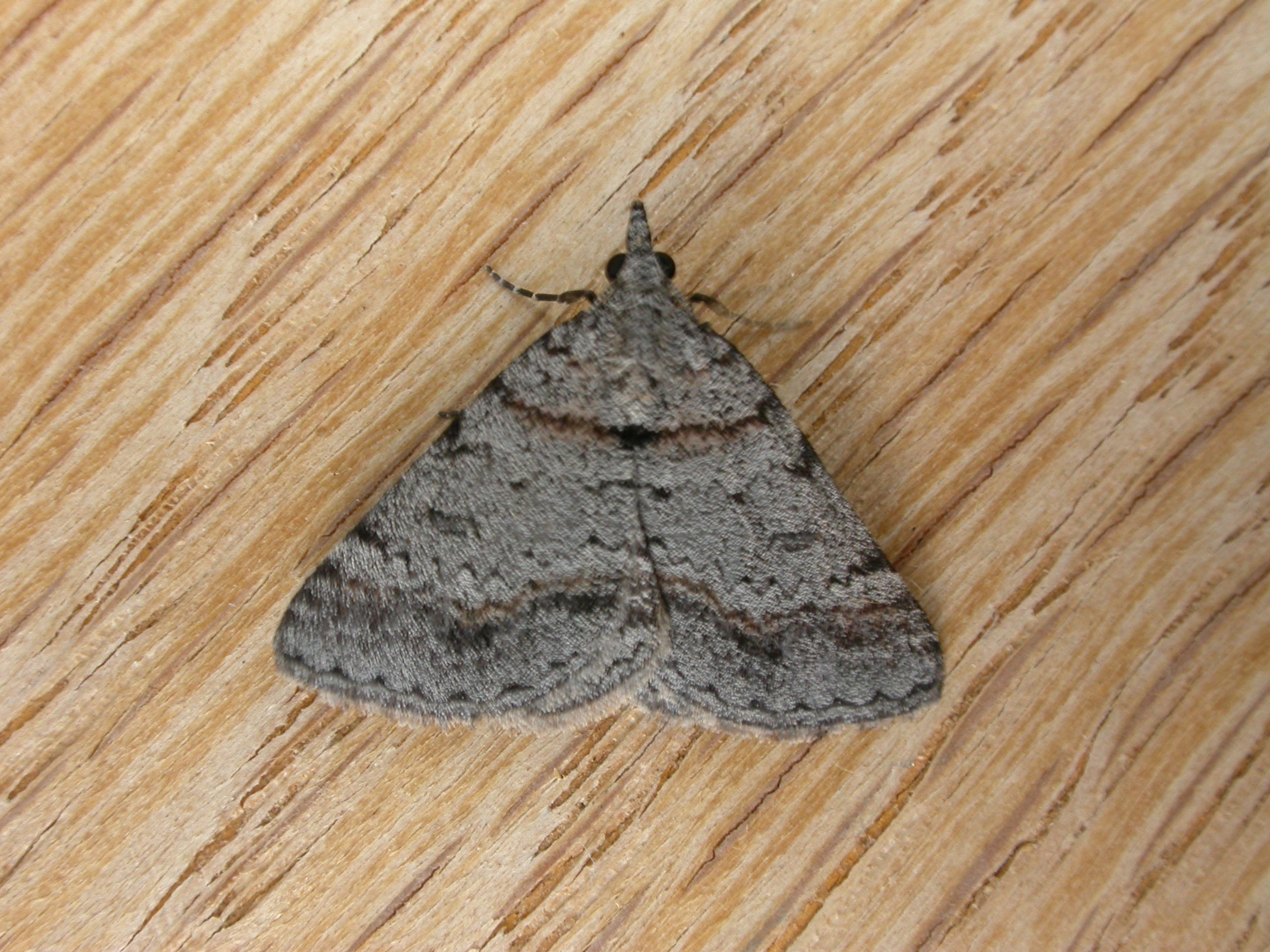

Scientific classification
- Kingdom: Animalia
- Phylum: Arthropoda
- Class: Insecta
- Order: Lepidoptera
- Family: Geometridae
- Genus: Dichromodes
- Species: D. obtusata

Binomial name
- Dichromodes obtusata (Walker, 1861)

Synonyms
- Panagra obtusata Walker, 1861; Panagra devitata Walker, 1861

= Dichromodes obtusata =

Species of moth

Dichromodes obtusata is a species of moth of the family Geometridae. It is known from Australia.
