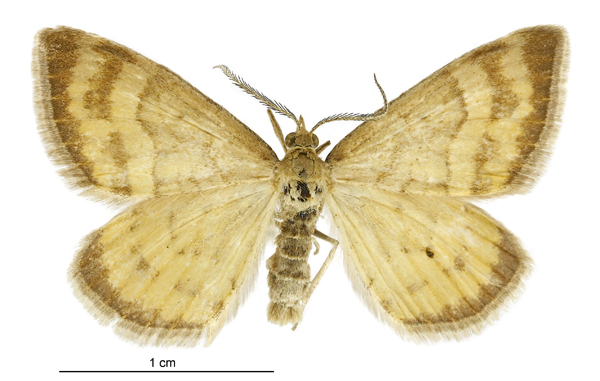
- Male specimen
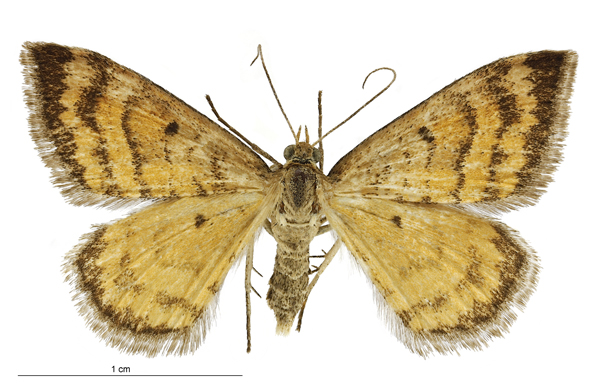
- Female specimen

Scientific classification
- Kingdom: Animalia
- Phylum: Arthropoda
- Clade: Pancrustacea
- Class: Insecta
- Order: Lepidoptera
- Family: Geometridae
- Genus: Asaphodes
- Species: A. abrogata

Binomial name
- Asaphodes abrogata (Walker, 1862)

Synonyms
- Aspilates abrogata Walker, 1862; Thyone abrogata (Walker, 1862); Fidonia servularia Guenée, 1868

= Asaphodes abrogata =

Species of moth

Asaphodes abrogata is a moth in the family Geometridae. It is endemic to New Zealand and can be found in the South Island. This species is inhabits open country from sea level up to over 5000 ft but have been observed commonly at altitudes of between 2000 and 4000 ft. Larvae have been reared on Plantago species including Plantago coronopus. Adults are on the wing between February and April. It has been recommended that Plantago raoulii be planted to attracted this species.

== Taxonomy ==
This species was first described by Francis Walker in 1862 and named Aspilates abrogata, using a specimen collected by P. Earl in Waikouaiti. In 1883 Edward Meyrick placed this species in the Thyone genus and synonymised Fidonia servularia with this species. He discussed this placement and the species in 1884. In 1885 Meyrick replaced the genus name Thyone with Asaphodes. He explained in 1886 that when naming several new genera he had used names that had already been employed and that he had to correct this error. As such he renamed the genus Thyone with the name Asaphodes. In 1898 George Hudson discussed and illustrated this species under the name Asaphodes abrogata. Hudson did the same again in his 1928 publication The butterflies and moths of New Zealand. In 1971 John S. Dugdale confirmed the placement of this species in the genus Asaphodes. In 1988 Dugdale again confirmed this placement in his catalogue of New Zealand Lepidoptera. The holotype of this species is held at the Natural History Museum, London.

== Description ==
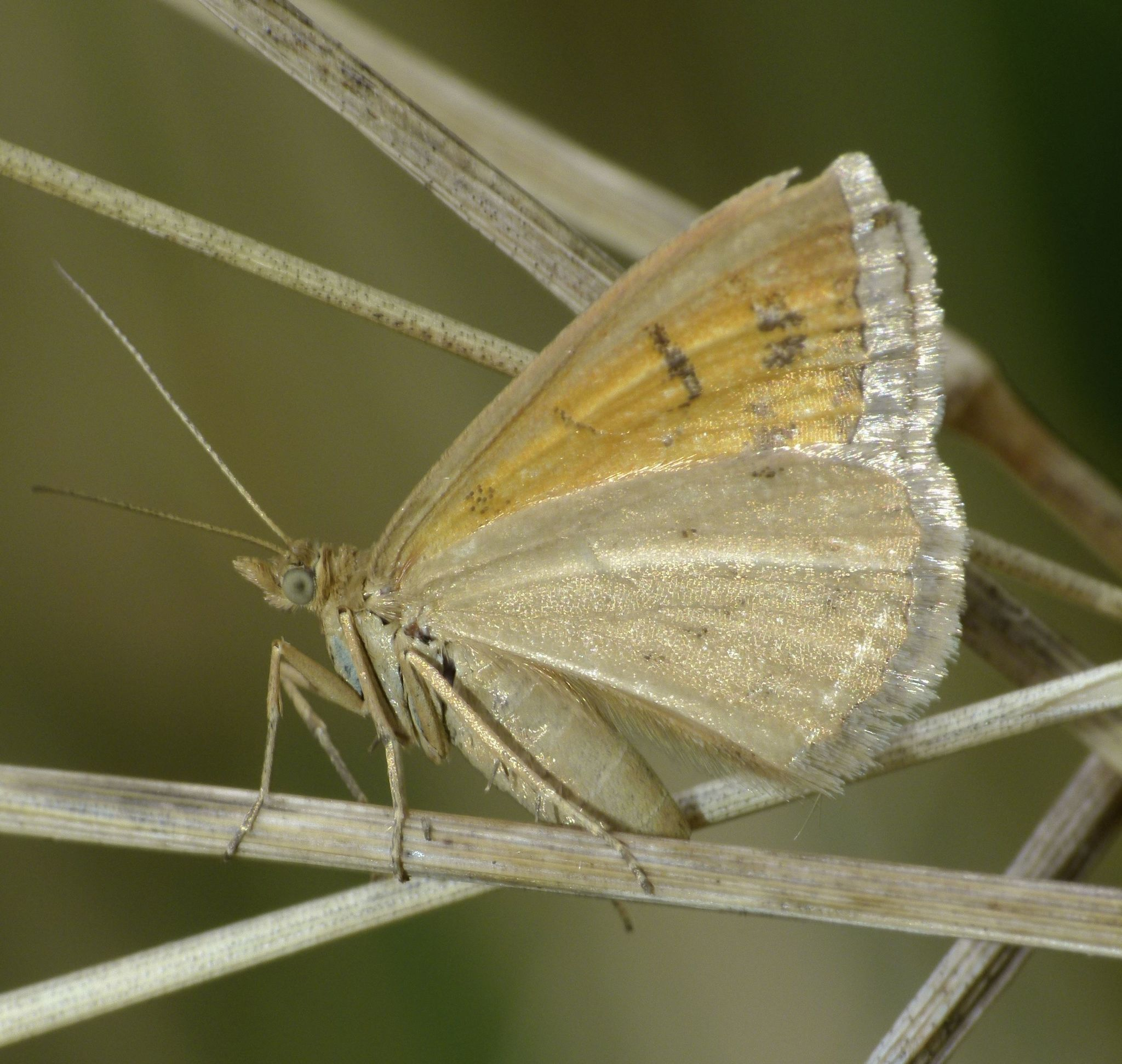
A. abrogata at rest.

Walker described the species as follows:

Male. Pale luteous. Palpi porrect, fringed, rather slender, extending beyond the head. Antennae rather broadly pectinated; branches remote from each other. Wings with a brown marginal band, which is incomplete in the fore wing. Fore wings slightly acute; exterior and submarginal lines brownish, undulating, almost parallel, the later apparent here and there on the hind wings.; costa and exterior border slightly convex, the latter rather oblique. Wings beneath with broader and more distinct lines. Length of the body 5 lines; of the wings 12 lines.

Hudson described this species as follows:

The expansion of the wings is about 1 inch. All the wings are ochreous with pale brown markings. The fore-wings have a conspicuous dot in the middle, a fine wavy transverse line a little beyond the middle, a subterminal line, and a brown shading on the termen, broader near the apex of the wing. The hind-wings have a brown central dot and two transverse lines. The cilia of all the wings are brownish.

The brown markings on the forewings of this species are variable and there is sometimes a transverse line near the base of the forewings.

== Distribution ==
This species is endemic to New Zealand. It can be found in the South Island particularly in Canterbury, Otago and Southland.

== Habitat and hosts ==
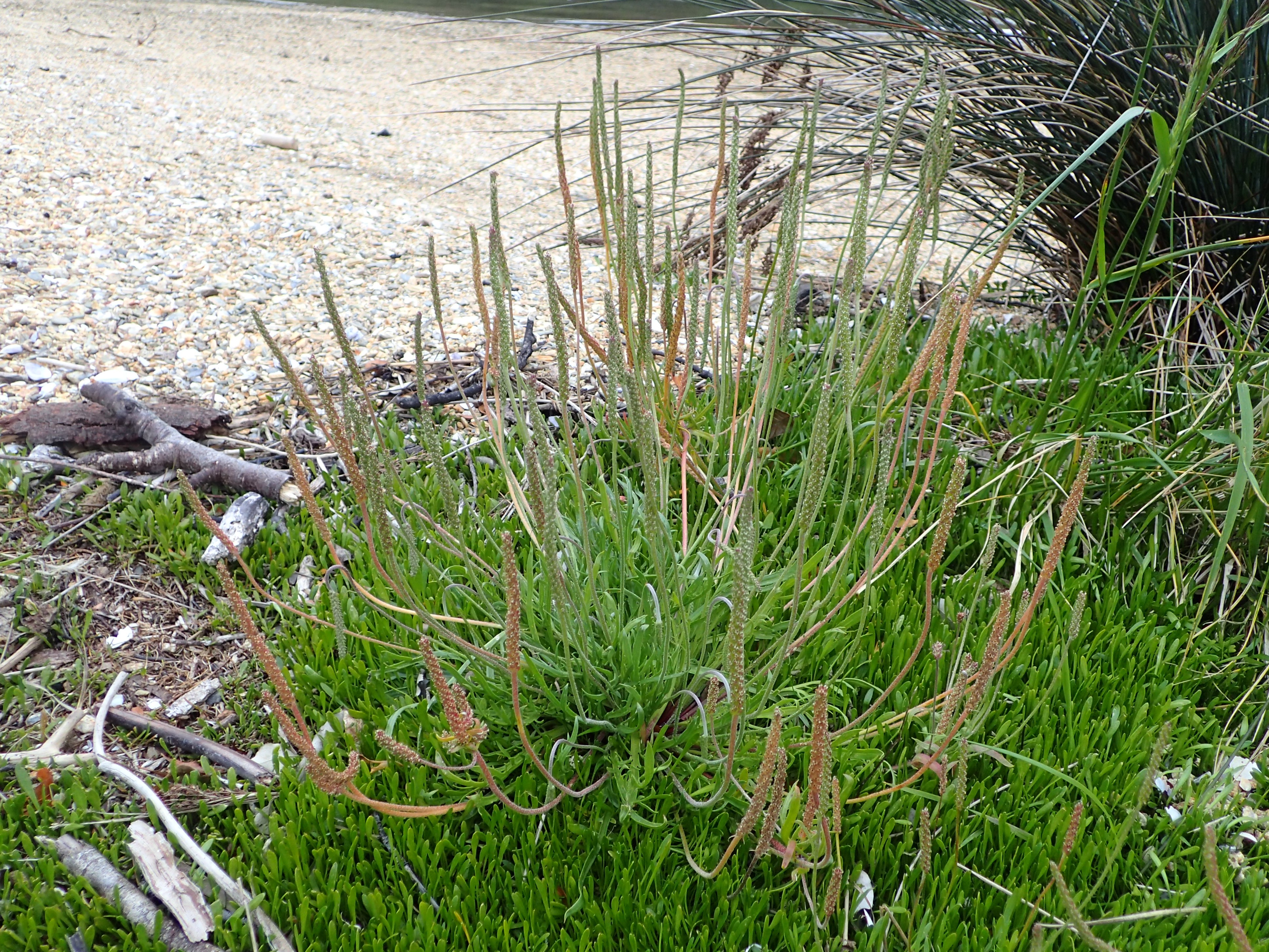
Plantago coronopus, larval host species.

A. abrogata is inhabits open country and tussock grasslands, from sea level up to over 5000 ft above sea level. Hudson stated this species could frequently be observed at altitudes of between 2000 and 4000 ft. Larvae have been reared on Plantago species including Plantago coronopus. It has been recommended to plant the endemic species Plantago raoulii to attract this species of moth.

== Behaviour ==
The adults of this species are on the wing from February to April. Adults are attracted to light and have been collected via a mercury vapour light trap.
