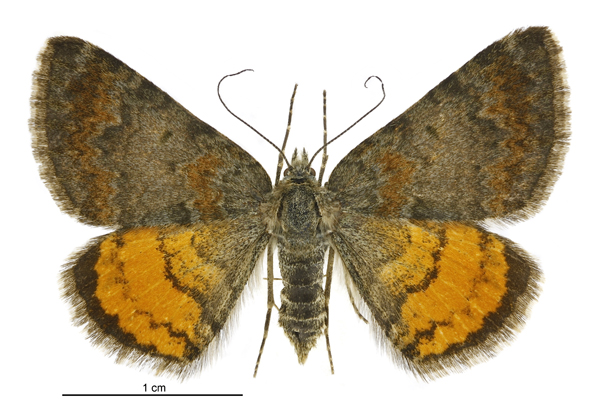
- Female
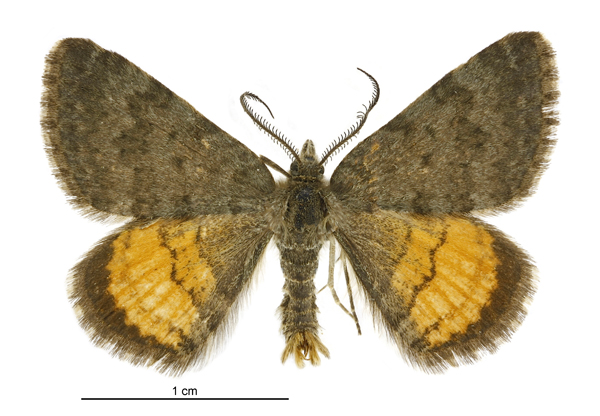
- Male

Scientific classification
- Kingdom: Animalia
- Phylum: Arthropoda
- Clade: Pancrustacea
- Class: Insecta
- Order: Lepidoptera
- Family: Geometridae
- Genus: Paranotoreas
- Species: P. brephosata

Binomial name
- Paranotoreas brephosata (Walker, 1862)

Synonyms
- Fidonia brephosata Walker, 1862; Larentia catocalaria Guenée, 1868; Fidonia brephos Felder & Rogenhofer, 1875; Pasithea vulcanica Meyrick 1883

= Paranotoreas brephosata =

Species of moth

Paranotoreas brephosata is a species of moth in the family Geometridae. This species is endemic to New Zealand.

== Taxonomy ==
This species was first described by Francis Walker in 1862 and given the name Fidonia brephosata.

George Hudson discussed and illustrated this species in his 1898 book New Zealand Moths and Butterflies (Macro-lepidoptera) and his 1928 book The Butterflies and Moths of New Zealand under the name Notoreas brephos. In 1986 Robin C. Craw proposed placing this species within the genus Paranotoreas. The lectotype specimen is held at the Natural History Museum, London.

== Description ==
Hudson described the species as follows:

The expansion of the wings is about 1 inch. The fore-wings are dark grey; there is a wavy black line near the base, two similar lines enclosing a very broad central area, with a black dot a little above the middle; beyond this there is a more or less distinct wavy band of pale grey or brown; there are several obscure wavy blackish lines near the termen. The hind-wings are bright orange, dotted with grey near the base and dorsum, with from two to four more or less distinct wavy black transverse lines, generally rather narrow; the termen is moderately broadly bordered with black.
