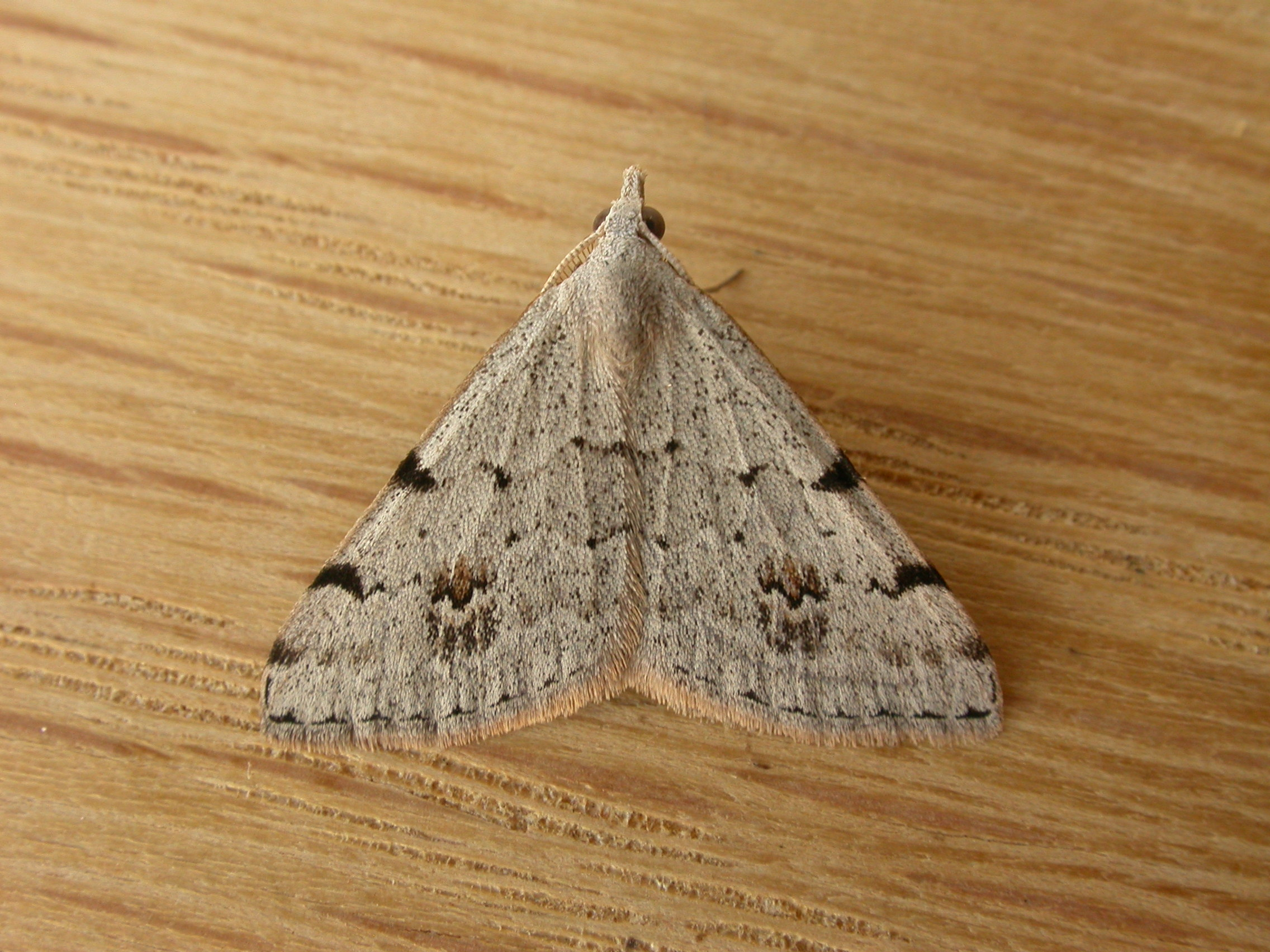

Scientific classification
- Kingdom: Animalia
- Phylum: Arthropoda
- Class: Insecta
- Order: Lepidoptera
- Family: Geometridae
- Genus: Dichromodes
- Species: D. estigmaria

Binomial name
- Dichromodes estigmaria Walker, 1861

= Dichromodes estigmaria =

Species of moth

Dichromodes estigmaria is a moth of the family Geometridae. It is found in Australia.
