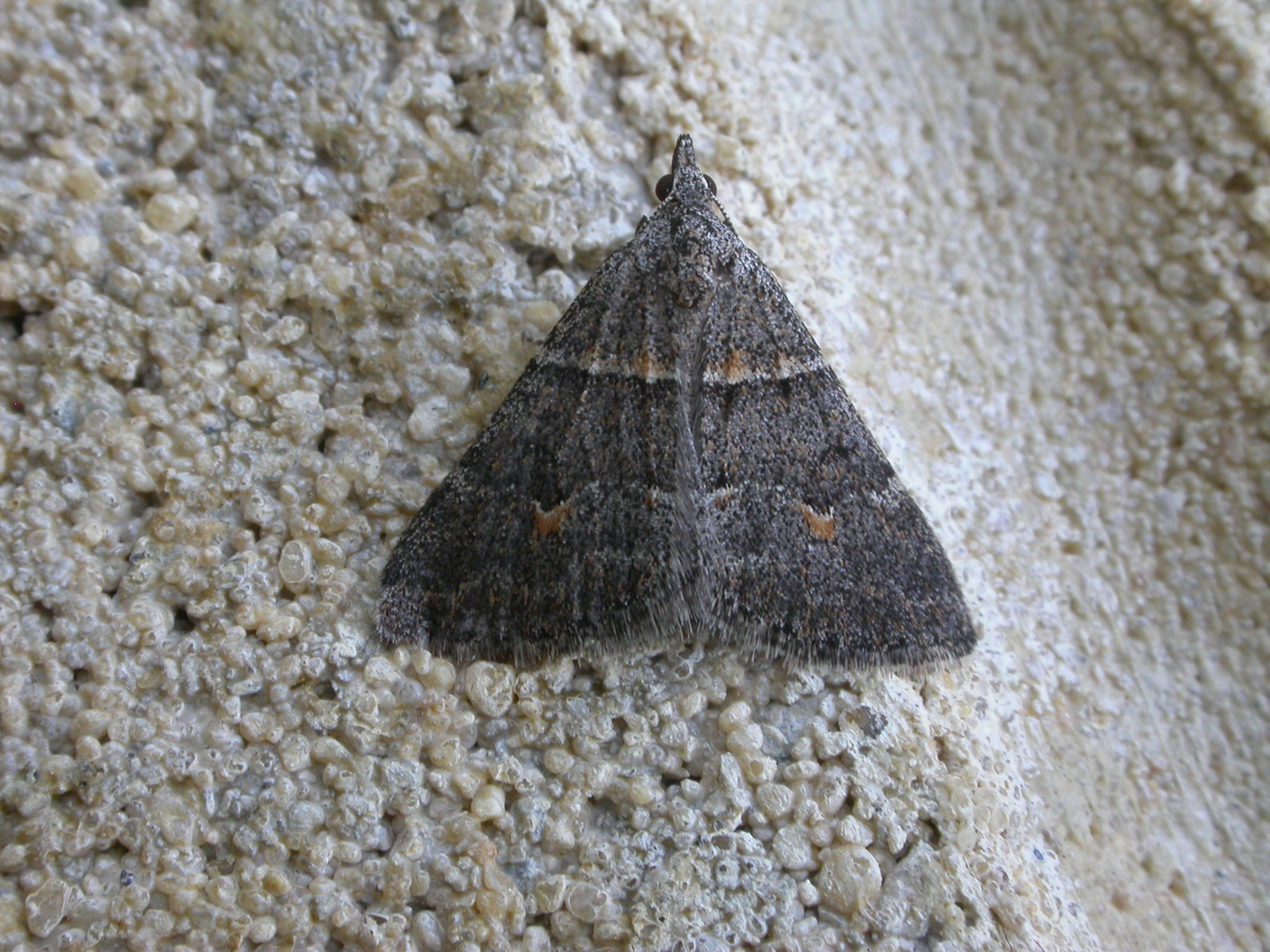

Scientific classification
- Kingdom: Animalia
- Phylum: Arthropoda
- Class: Insecta
- Order: Lepidoptera
- Family: Geometridae
- Subfamily: Oenochrominae
- Genus: Dichromodes; Guenée, 1857

Synonyms
- Cacopsodos Butler, 1877

= Dichromodes =

Genus of moths

Dichromodes is a genus of moths in the family Geometridae first described by Achille Guenée in 1857. The type species is Dichromodes ainaria.

== Species ==
- Dichromodes aesia Turner, 1930
- Dichromodes ainaria Guenée, 1857
- Dichromodes anelictis Meyrick, 1890
- Dichromodes angasi (R. Felder & Rogenhofer, 1875)
- Dichromodes aristadelpha Lower, 1903
- Dichromodes atrosignata (Walker, 1861)
- Dichromodes berthoudi Prout, 1910
- Dichromodes capnoporphyra Turner, 1939
- Dichromodes cirrhoplaca Lower, 1915
- Dichromodes compsotis Meyrick, 1890
- Dichromodes confluaria (Guenée, 1857)
- Dichromodes consignata (Walker, 1861)
- Dichromodes cynica Meyrick, 1911
- Dichromodes denticulata Turner, 1930
- Dichromodes diffusaria (Guenée, 1857)
- Dichromodes disputata (Walker, 1861)
- Dichromodes emplecta Turner, 1930
- Dichromodes estigmaria (Walker, 1861)
- Dichromodes euprepes Prout, 1910
- Dichromodes euscia Meyrick, 1890
- Dichromodes explanata (Walker, 1861)
- Dichromodes exsignata (Walker, 1861)
- Dichromodes fulvida Lower, 1915
- Dichromodes galactica Turner, 1930
- Dichromodes gypsotis Meyrick, 1888
- Dichromodes haematopa Turner, 1906
- Dichromodes ida Hudson, 1905
- Dichromodes icelodes Turner, 1930
- Dichromodes indicataria (Walker, 1866)
- Dichromodes ioneura Meyrick, 1890
- Dichromodes ischnota Meyrick, 1890
- Dichromodes lechria Turner, 1943
- Dichromodes leptogramma Turner, 1930
- Dichromodes leptozona Turner, 1930
- Dichromodes limosa Turner, 1930
- Dichromodes lissophrica Turner, 1930
- Dichromodes longidens Prout, 1910
- Dichromodes loxotropha Turner, 1943
- Dichromodes lygrodes Turner, 1930
- Dichromodes mesodonta Turner, 1930
- Dichromodes mesogonia Prout, 1910
- Dichromodes mesoporphyra Turner, 1939
- Dichromodes mesotoma Turner, 1943
- Dichromodes mesozona L.B. Prout, 1910
- Dichromodes molybdaria (Guenée, 1857)
- Dichromodes obtusata (Walker, 1861)
- Dichromodes orectis Meyrick, 1890
- Dichromodes oriphoetes Turner, 1930
- Dichromodes ornata (Walker, 1861)
- Dichromodes orthotis Meyrick, 1890
- Dichromodes orthozona Lower, 1903
- Dichromodes paratacta Meyrick, 1890
- Dichromodes partitaria (Walker, 1866)
- Dichromodes personalis (R. Felder & Rogenhofer, 1874)
- Dichromodes phaeoxesta Turner, 1939
- Dichromodes poecilotis Meyrick, 1890
- Dichromodes simulans Hudson, 1908
- Dichromodes sphaeriata (Felder & Rogenhofer, 1875)
- Dichromodes raynori Prout, 1920
- Dichromodes rimosa Prout, 1910
- Dichromodes rostrata Turner, 1930
- Dichromodes rufilinea Turner, 1939
- Dichromodes rufula Prout, 1910
- Dichromodes scothima Prout, 1910
- Dichromodes semicanescens Prout, 1913
- Dichromodes sigmata (Walker, 1861)
- Dichromodes stilbiata (Guenée, 1857)
- Dichromodes subrufa Turner, 1939
- Dichromodes triparata (Walker, 1861)
- Dichromodes typhistis Turner, 1939
- Dichromodes uniformis Bastelberger, 1907
- Dichromodes usurpatrix Prout, 1910
