= Poolburn =

Locality in Otago Region, New Zealand

Coordinates: 45°08′15″S 169°42′00″E

Poolburn is a small rural settlement in Central Otago, in the South Island of New Zealand. It is located in the Ida Valley nine kilometres to the southeast of Ophir. It has a primary school, a former hotel, a community hall, a sports ground, tennis courts and a (closed) church. It has nearby historic gold mine workings ("Blacks No. 3") at the eastern foot of the Raggedy Range.

== Climate ==
Climate data for Poolburn (Moa Creek), elevation 427 m (1,401 ft), (1957–1984)
Month	Jan	Feb	Mar	Apr	May	Jun	Jul	Aug	Sep	Oct	Nov	Dec	Year
Record high °C (°F)	34.1 (93.4)	33.5 (92.3)	29.5 (85.1)	25.5 (77.9)	19.8 (67.6)	16.9 (62.4)	15.3 (59.5)	18.2 (64.8)	22.0 (71.6)	24.7 (76.5)	29.0 (84.2)	31.3 (88.3)	34.1 (93.4)
Mean maximum °C (°F)	29.7 (85.5)	29.2 (84.6)	26.1 (79.0)	21.8 (71.2)	17.5 (63.5)	13.3 (55.9)	12.2 (54.0)	15.6 (60.1)	18.6 (65.5)	22.2 (72.0)	24.6 (76.3)	27.5 (81.5)	30.8 (87.4)
Mean daily maximum °C (°F)	22.2 (72.0)	22.4 (72.3)	19.6 (67.3)	15.8 (60.4)	10.5 (50.9)	6.7 (44.1)	6.4 (43.5)	9.8 (49.6)	13.4 (56.1)	16.0 (60.8)	18.2 (64.8)	20.9 (69.6)	15.2 (59.3)
Daily mean °C (°F)	14.7 (58.5)	14.7 (58.5)	12.3 (54.1)	8.4 (47.1)	3.9 (39.0)	1.2 (34.2)	1.1 (34.0)	3.4 (38.1)	6.2 (43.2)	9.0 (48.2)	11.2 (52.2)	13.7 (56.7)	8.3 (47.0)
Mean daily minimum °C (°F)	7.1 (44.8)	6.9 (44.4)	5.0 (41.0)	0.9 (33.6)	−2.7 (27.1)	−4.4 (24.1)	−4.2 (24.4)	−3.1 (26.4)	−1.0 (30.2)	2.0 (35.6)	4.2 (39.6)	6.5 (43.7)	1.4 (34.6)
Mean minimum °C (°F)	−0.4 (31.3)	−1.0 (30.2)	−2.7 (27.1)	−6.0 (21.2)	−9.4 (15.1)	−9.6 (14.7)	−9.8 (14.4)	−8.1 (17.4)	−6.8 (19.8)	−4.9 (23.2)	−3.7 (25.3)	−1.2 (29.8)	−10.9 (12.4)
Record low °C (°F)	−3.0 (26.6)	−4.5 (23.9)	−5.8 (21.6)	−8.6 (16.5)	−12.3 (9.9)	−12.4 (9.7)	−16.8 (1.8)	−10.9 (12.4)	−10.6 (12.9)	−7.5 (18.5)	−7.5 (18.5)	−4.5 (23.9)	−16.8 (1.8)
Average rainfall mm (inches)	49.0 (1.93)	37.0 (1.46)	41.5 (1.63)	34.8 (1.37)	30.7 (1.21)	25.0 (0.98)	20.0 (0.79)	20.3 (0.80)	25.0 (0.98)	36.8 (1.45)	36.5 (1.44)	44.4 (1.75)	401 (15.79)
Source: Earth Sciences NZ (rainfall 1913–1984)
