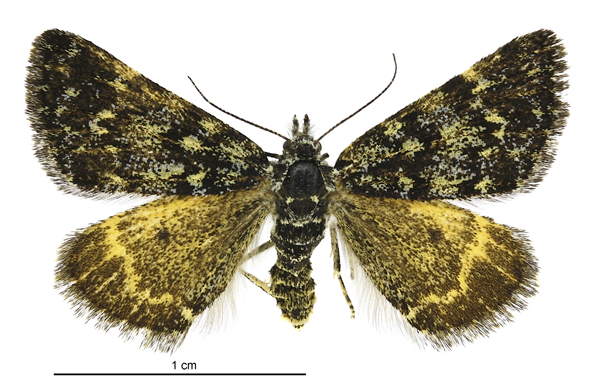
- Female
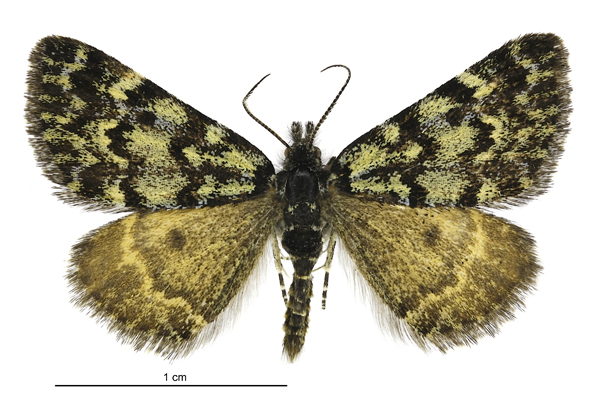
- Male

Scientific classification
- Kingdom: Animalia
- Phylum: Arthropoda
- Class: Insecta
- Order: Lepidoptera
- Family: Geometridae
- Genus: Dichromodes
- Species: D. ida

Binomial name
- Dichromodes ida Hudson, 1905

= Dichromodes ida =

Species of moth endemic to New Zealand

Dichromodes ida (also known as the blue and orange rock looper) is a moth of the family Geometridae. This species was first described by George Hudson in 1905. It is endemic to New Zealand and is found in Central Otago. This species inhabits open rocky places at altitudes between 100m to 900m. The larvae of D. ida are cryptic in appearance and feed on lichens growing on rocks. They appear to pupate in rock clefts, forming a chamber made of moss and silk. Adults are day flying and are on the wing from October until December.

== Taxonomy ==
This species was first described by George Hudson in 1905 using a specimen collected at Ida Valley by J. H. Lewis. George Hudson discussed and illustrated this species in his 1928 book The butterflies and moths of New Zealand. The male lectotype is held at Te Papa.

== Description ==
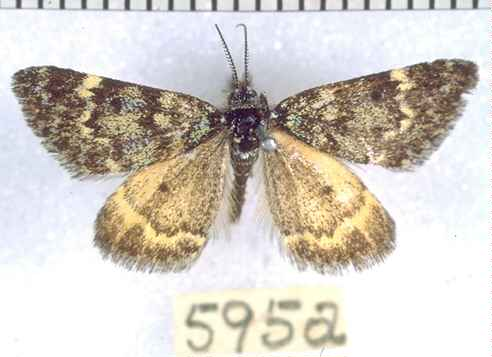
Male lectotype of D. ida.

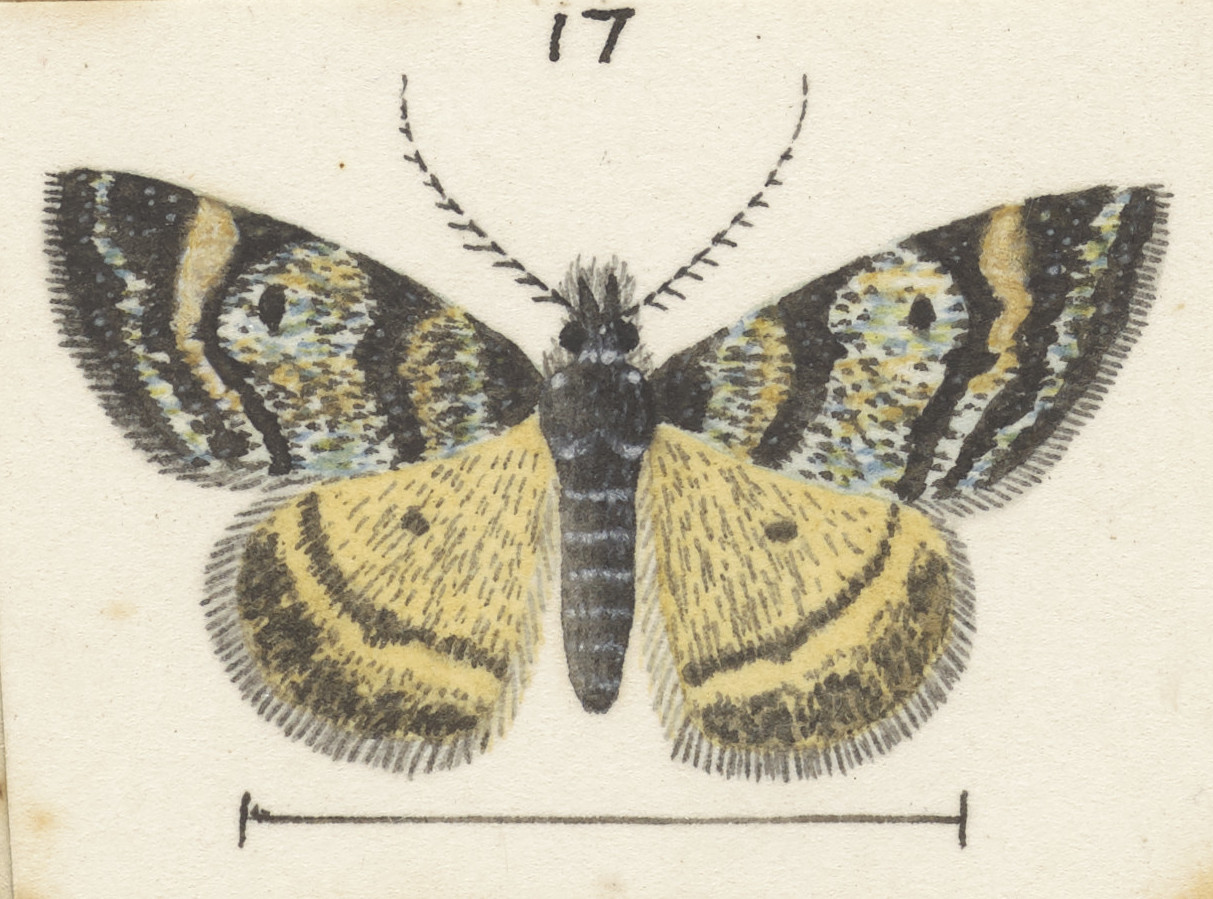
Illustration of male by G. Hudson

J. H. Lewis, the collector of the holotype specimen, was quoted by Hudson describing the pupa and larvae of this species. Lewis was quoted as follows:

The specimen was bred from a pupa found in a cleft of rock: a chamber had been formed by cementing moss - dust and silk together. From the fragments of caterpillar-skin remaining, I judge that the larva was one I had tried unsuccessfully to rear a few weeks ago, found feeding openly on lichen, remarkable for its fimbriated aspect, each segment being produced into irregular lobed processes at the edges—very protective amongst lichen.

Hudson described this species as follows:

The expansion of the wings is 7/8 in. The fore wings are very pale greenish-blue, speckled and marked with black. There is an ill-defined wavy black stripe near the base, another at about 1/3; this is followed by a large central clear space containing a conspicuous discal spot above middle. There is a conspicuous very jagged black stripe from a little more than 1/2 of costa to about 3/4 of dorsum, followed by a very conspicuous pale-ochreous line; beyond this are two somewhat ill-defined black bands. The cilia are black, mixed with pale bluish-green. The hind wings are ochreous tinged with reddish and speckled with black, especially towards the base and termen. There is a conspicuous black discal spot and a clear rather wavy yellowish band about 3/4 from base to termen. The cilia are blackish. Head and thorax black dotted with pale bluish-green; abdomen yellowish.

== Distribution ==
This species is endemic to New Zealand. It is endemic to Central Otago.

== Habitat and hosts ==
This species inhabits open rocky country at altitudes between 100 and 900 m. Larvae of this species feed on lichens which grow on rocks.

== Behaviour ==
The adults of this species are day flying and are on the wing between October and December.
