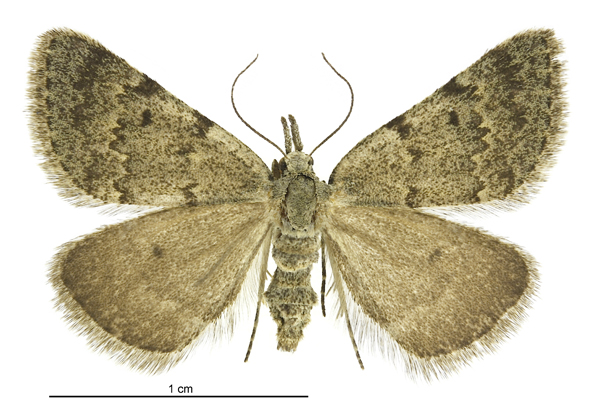
- Female
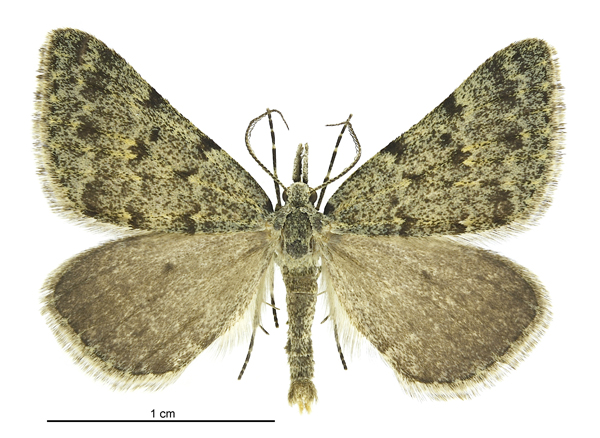
- Male

Scientific classification
- Kingdom: Animalia
- Phylum: Arthropoda
- Class: Insecta
- Order: Lepidoptera
- Family: Geometridae
- Genus: Dichromodes
- Species: D. sphaeriata

Binomial name
- Dichromodes sphaeriata (Felder & Rogenhofer, 1875)

Synonyms
- Cidaria sphaeriata Felder & Rogenhofer, 1875; Dichromodes petrina Meyrick, 1892

= Dichromodes sphaeriata =

Species of moth endemic to New Zealand

Dichromodes sphaeriata is a moth of the family Geometridae. It is endemic to New Zealand.

== Taxonomy ==
This species was first described by Cajetan von Felder and Alois Friedrich Rogenhofer in 1875 using a specimen collected in Nelson by T. R. Oxley and originally named this species Cidaria sphaeriata. In 1892 Edward Meyrick, thinking he was describing a new species, named it Dichromodes petrina. Prout synonymised this name in 1912. The male holotype is held at the Natural History Museum, London.

== Distribution ==
This species is endemic to New Zealand.
