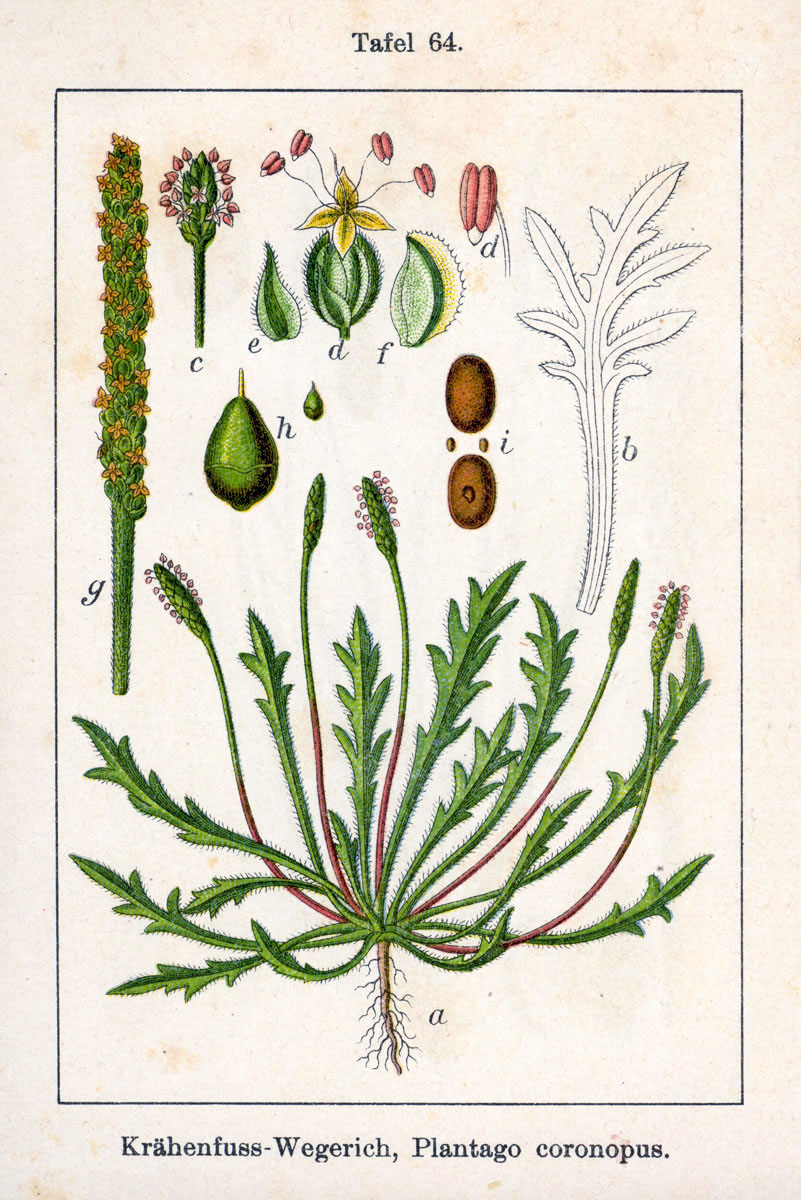

Scientific classification
- Kingdom: Plantae
- Clade: Embryophytes
- Clade: Tracheophytes
- Clade: Angiosperms
- Clade: Eudicots
- Clade: Asterids
- Order: Lamiales
- Family: Plantaginaceae
- Genus: Plantago
- Species: P. coronopus

Binomial name
- Plantago coronopus L.

Synonyms
- Arnoglossum subulatum Gray; Asterogeum laciniatum Gray; Coronopus vulgaris Fourr.

= Plantago coronopus =

Species of flowering plant

Plantago coronopus, the buck's-horn plantain, is a herbaceous annual to perennial flowering plant in the family Plantaginaceae. Other common names in the US and Italy include minutina and erba stella.

== Description ==
Plantago coronopus produces a basal rosette of narrowly lance-shaped leaves up to 25 centimeters (9.8 in) long that are toothed or deeply divided. The inflorescences grow erect to about 4 to 7 cm (1.6 to 2.8 in) in height. They have dense spikes of flowers which sometimes curve. Each flower has four whitish lobes each measuring about a millimeter long. Plantago coronopus mainly grows on sandy or gravelly soils close to the sea, but also on salt-treated roadsides. It is native to Eurasia and North Africa but it can be found elsewhere, including the United States, Australia, and New Zealand as an introduced species.

It is grown as a leaf vegetable known as erba stella, mostly incorporated in salad mixes for specialty markets. Recently it has become popular as a frost-hardy winter crop for farmers in northern climates, and is usually grown in unheated hightunnels.

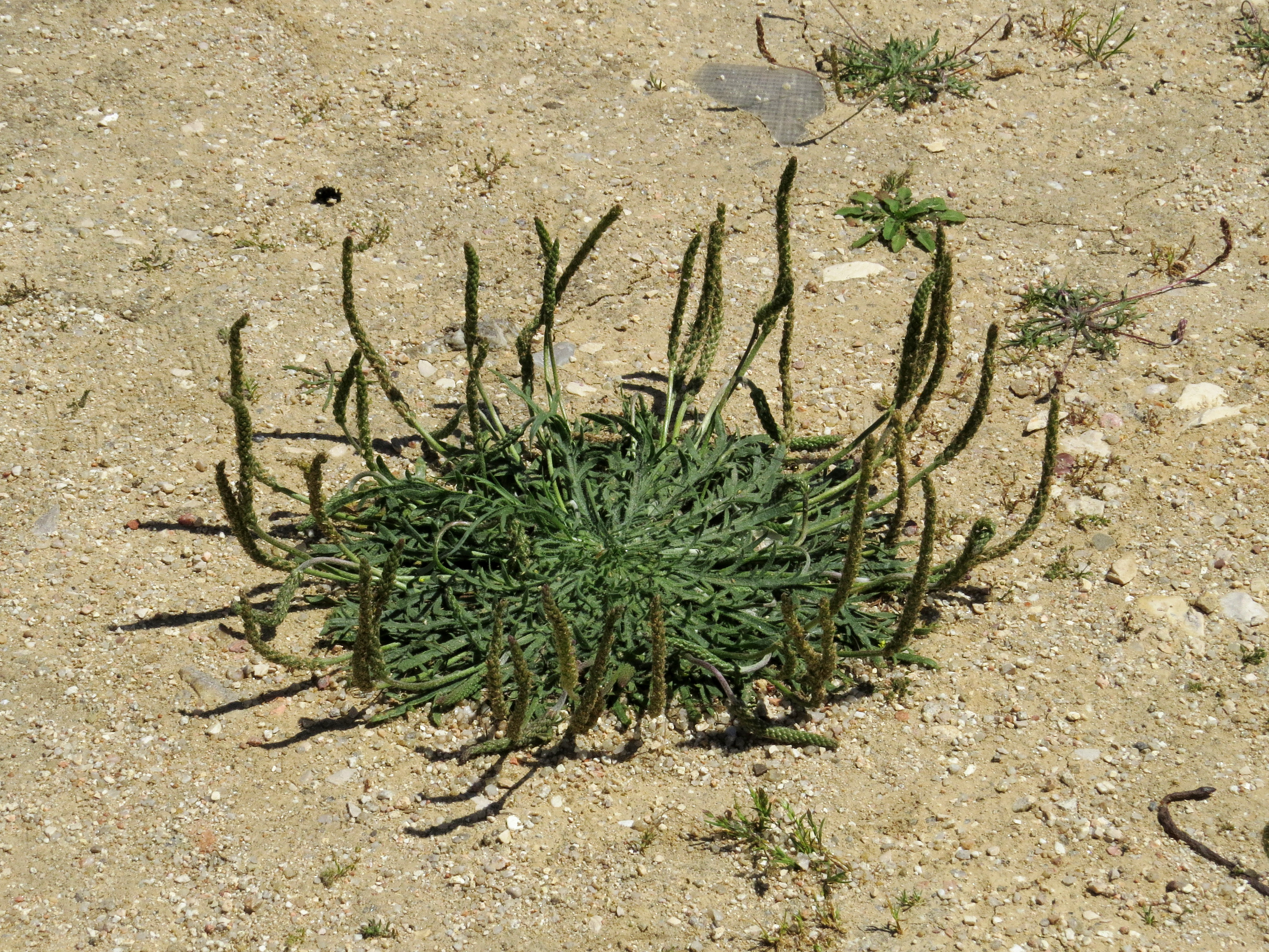

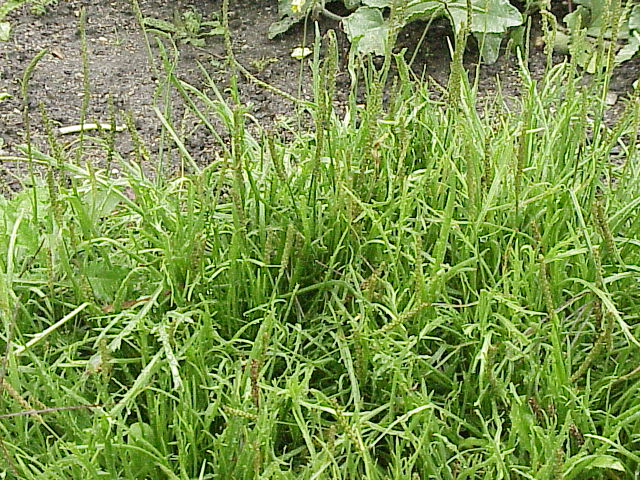
