= Deadman Canyon =

Canyon in Kings Canyon National Park, US

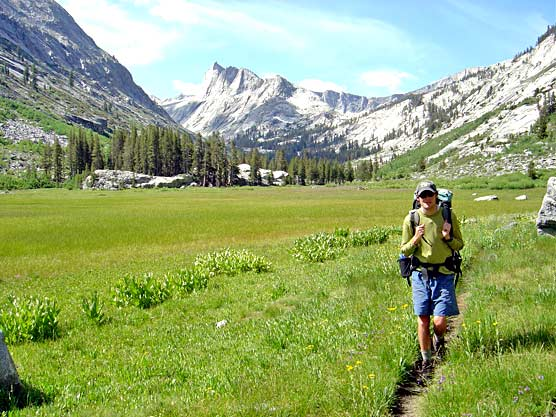
- Backpacker in Ranger Meadow, Deadman Canyon
- Floor elevation: 7,620 feet (2,320 m)
- Length: 8 miles (13 km)

Geography
- Location: Kings Canyon National Park, Sierra Nevada, California, United States
- Coordinates: 36°42′18″N 118°34′47″W
- Interactive map of Deadman Canyon

Deadman Canyon is a glacier-carved canyon in Kings Canyon National Park. Its namesake is an Iberian sheep-herder who died and is buried there.

== Geography ==
Deadman Canyon is located almost directly north of Elizabeth Pass, between Ranger Meadow and Scaffold Meadows, in the south-central area of the park. The canyon is surrounded by steep granite walls, and is traversed by a stream.

== Flora ==
Plant life in the canyon include aspens and pines, along with buckwheat, sagebrush, Indian paintbrush, mariposa lily, columbine, delphinium, daisy, Mexican hat, penstemon, pennyroyal, and shooting star.

== The Grave ==
Near the trail that crosses the canyon is the grave for which the canyon is named. The rustic plot is surrounded with a timber fence, and features a marker that reads, “HERE REPOSES ALFRED MONIERE, SHEEPHERDER, MOUNTAIN MAN, 18—TO 1887.” Two common versions of this man's story exist. In one, he is murdered, and in the other, he became ill and died while his partner went to Fresno for help.

Despite the date on the marker, the August 1959 issue of National Geographic states that Moniere died in 1875.

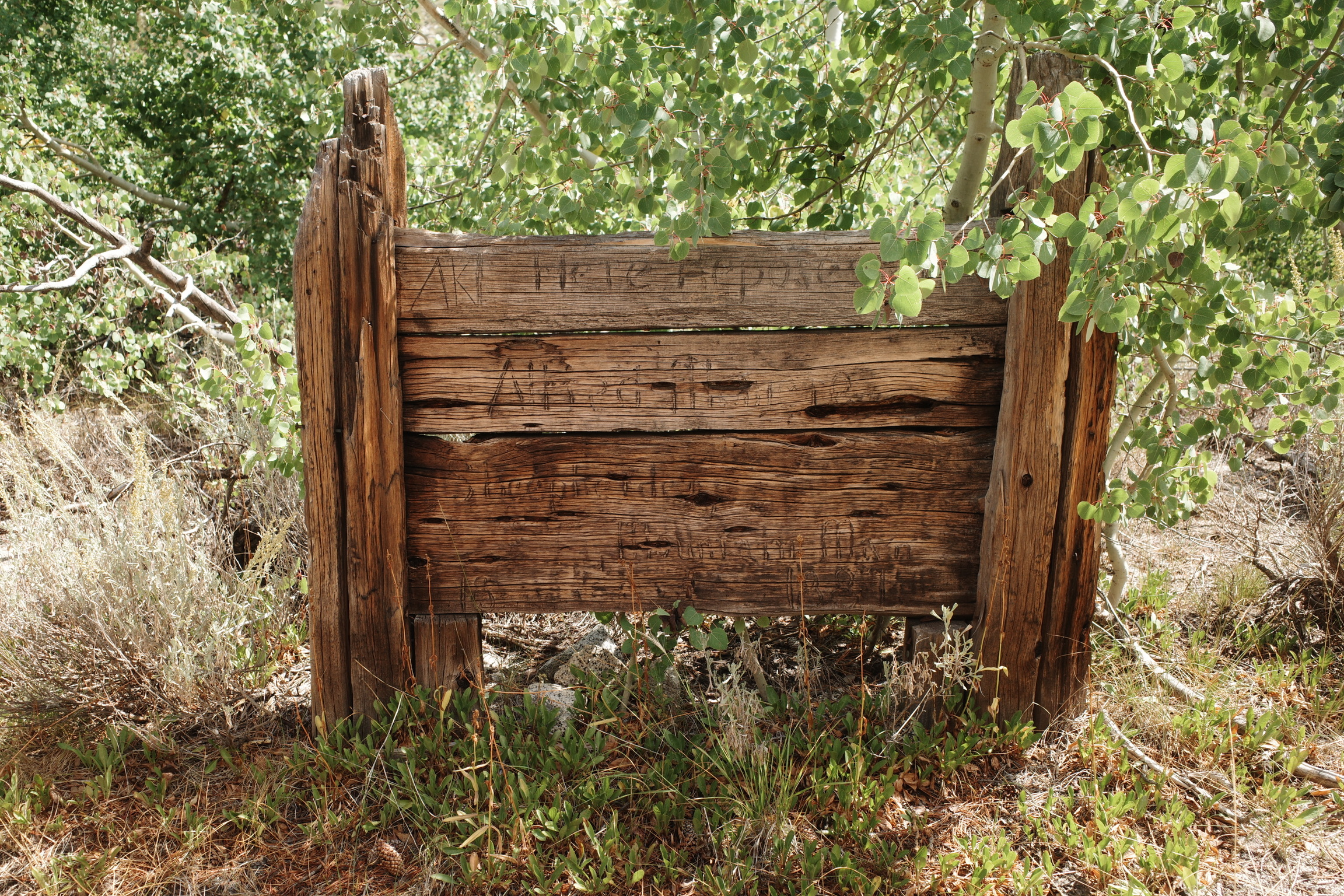
The grave of the sheep herder Alfred Moniere in a grove of aspens in Deadman Canyon, named for him.
