= Bellis annua subsp. minuta =

Scientific classification
- Kingdom: Plantae
- Clade: Tracheophytes
- Clade: Angiosperms
- Clade: Eudicots
- Clade: Asterids
- Order: Asterales
- Family: Asteraceae
- Genus: Bellis
- Species: B. annua
- Subspecies: B. a. subsp. minuta

Trinomial name
- Bellis annua subsp. minuta (DC.) Meikle

Subspecies of flowering plant

Bellis annua subsp. minuta is a subspecies of daisy in the genus Bellis and is a subspecies of Bellis annua. It is endemic to the areas of the eastern and central Mediterranean.
