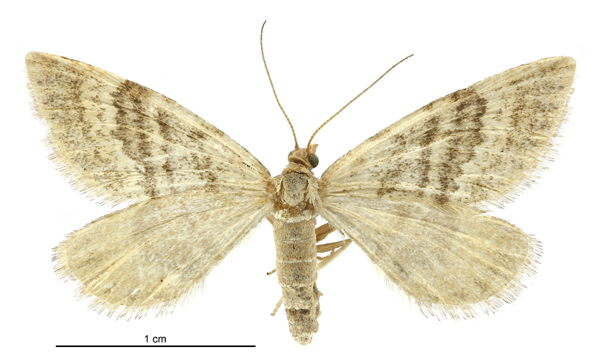
- Female
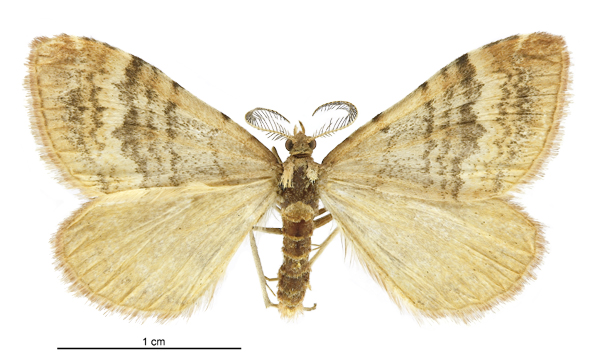
- Male

Scientific classification
- Kingdom: Animalia
- Phylum: Arthropoda
- Clade: Pancrustacea
- Class: Insecta
- Order: Lepidoptera
- Family: Geometridae
- Genus: Asaphodes
- Species: A. recta

Binomial name
- Asaphodes recta (Philpott, 1905)

Synonyms
- Xanthorhoe recta Philpott, 1905; Larentia recta (Philpott, 1905)

= Asaphodes recta =

Species of moth endemic to New Zealand

Asaphodes recta is a moth in the family Geometridae. It is endemic to New Zealand and is found in the southern parts of the South Island. The preferred habitat of this species is open tussock grassland. The adults are on the wing in February and March. Larvae of this species have been reared on species in the genera Ranunculus and Bellis.

== Taxonomy ==
This species was first described by Alfred Philpott in 1905 using specimens collected from Ida Valley and named Xanthorhoe recta. George Hudson discussed and illustrated this species under that name in 1928. In 1939 Louis Beethoven Prout placed this species in the genus Larentia. This placement was not accepted by New Zealand taxonomists. In 1971 J. S. Dugdale placed this species in the genus Asaphodes. In 1988 Dugdale confirmed this placement. The male holotype specimen, collected at Ida Valley in Otago, is held at the New Zealand Arthropod Collection.

== Description ==
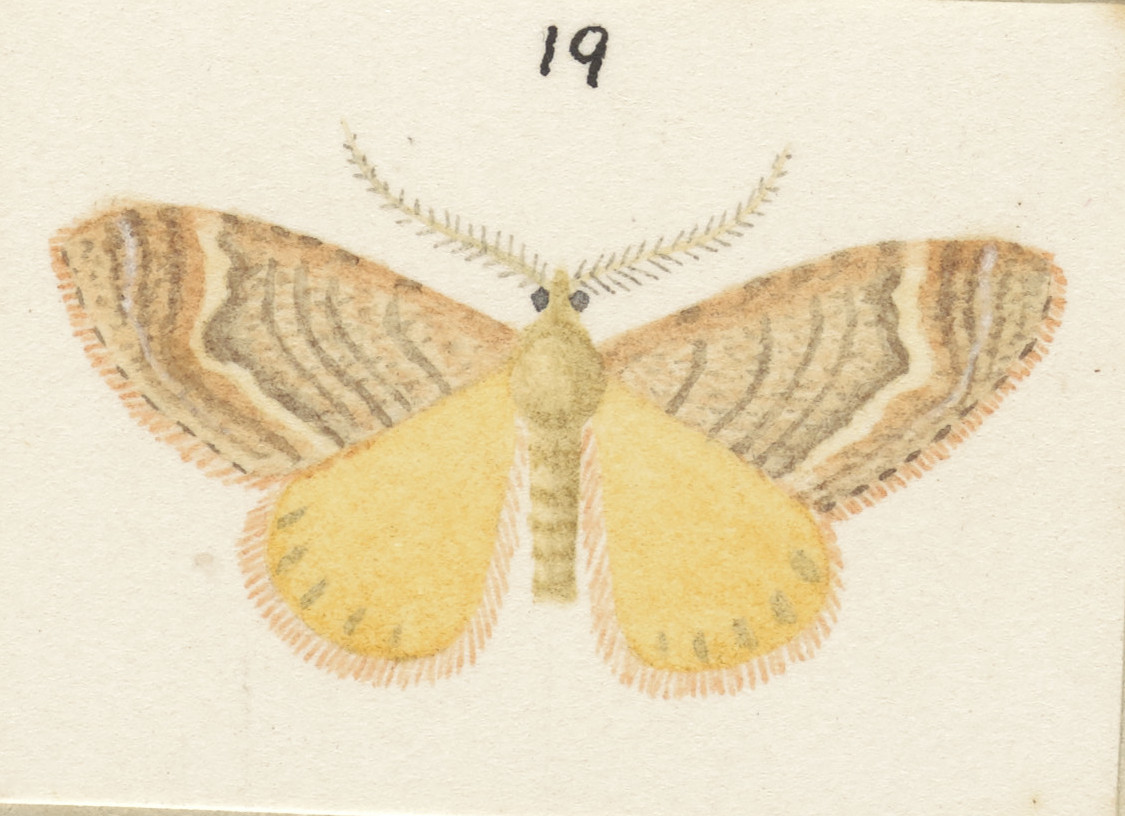
Illustration of A. recta by George Hudson.

Philpott described this species as:

♂, 31 mm. Head, thorax, and abdomen ochreous. Forewings moderate, greyish-ochreous, irregularly suffused with reddish especially towards costa, markings brownish; first line before 1/3, curved, anteriorly edged with grey; median bandformed of three or four thin lines with narrow spaces of ground-colour between; the first of these is almost straight and rather darker than the others; the posterior edge of the last one is irregular with two strong projections below middle; this is followed by a narrow band of pale-greyish, almost white in some examples; a broad band of brown from 4/5 of costa to tornus, posteriorly waved and followed by a waved pale line; cilia long, brownish-pink. Hind wings long, narrow, pale-yellow; a terminal series of indistinct linear brownish spots; cilia pink.

== Distribution ==
This species is endemic to New Zealand. Along with the type locality, specimens had also been collected near Dunedin and Invercargill.

== Habitat ==
The preferred habitat of this species is open tussock grassland in Otago and Southland.

== Behaviour ==
The adults of this species are on the wing in February and March.

== Hosts ==
Larvae of this species have been reared on species in the genera Ranunculus and Bellis.
