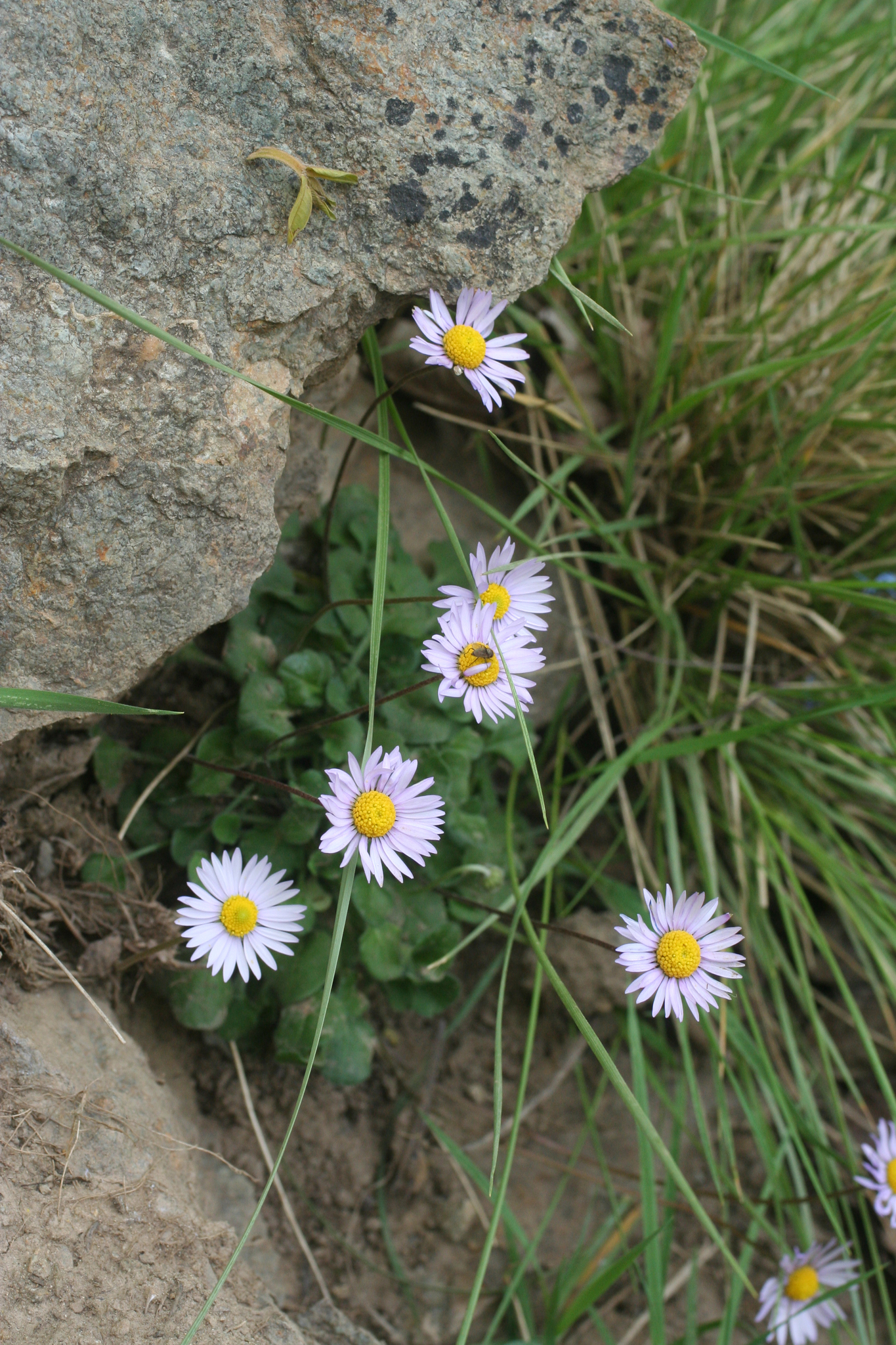

Scientific classification
- Kingdom: Plantae
- Clade: Tracheophytes
- Clade: Angiosperms
- Clade: Eudicots
- Clade: Asterids
- Order: Asterales
- Family: Asteraceae
- Genus: Bellis
- Species: B. caerulescens

Binomial name
- Bellis caerulescens (Coss.) Coss. ex Ball

= Bellis caerulescens =

Species of flowering plant

Bellis caerulescens is a species of daisy in the genus Bellis.

== Characteristics ==
It has pink-ish white petals that appear out from the yellow disk-like floret, much like the species Bellis perennis, however the petals are almost pink with a bit of white at the end where it connects with the disk-like floret.
