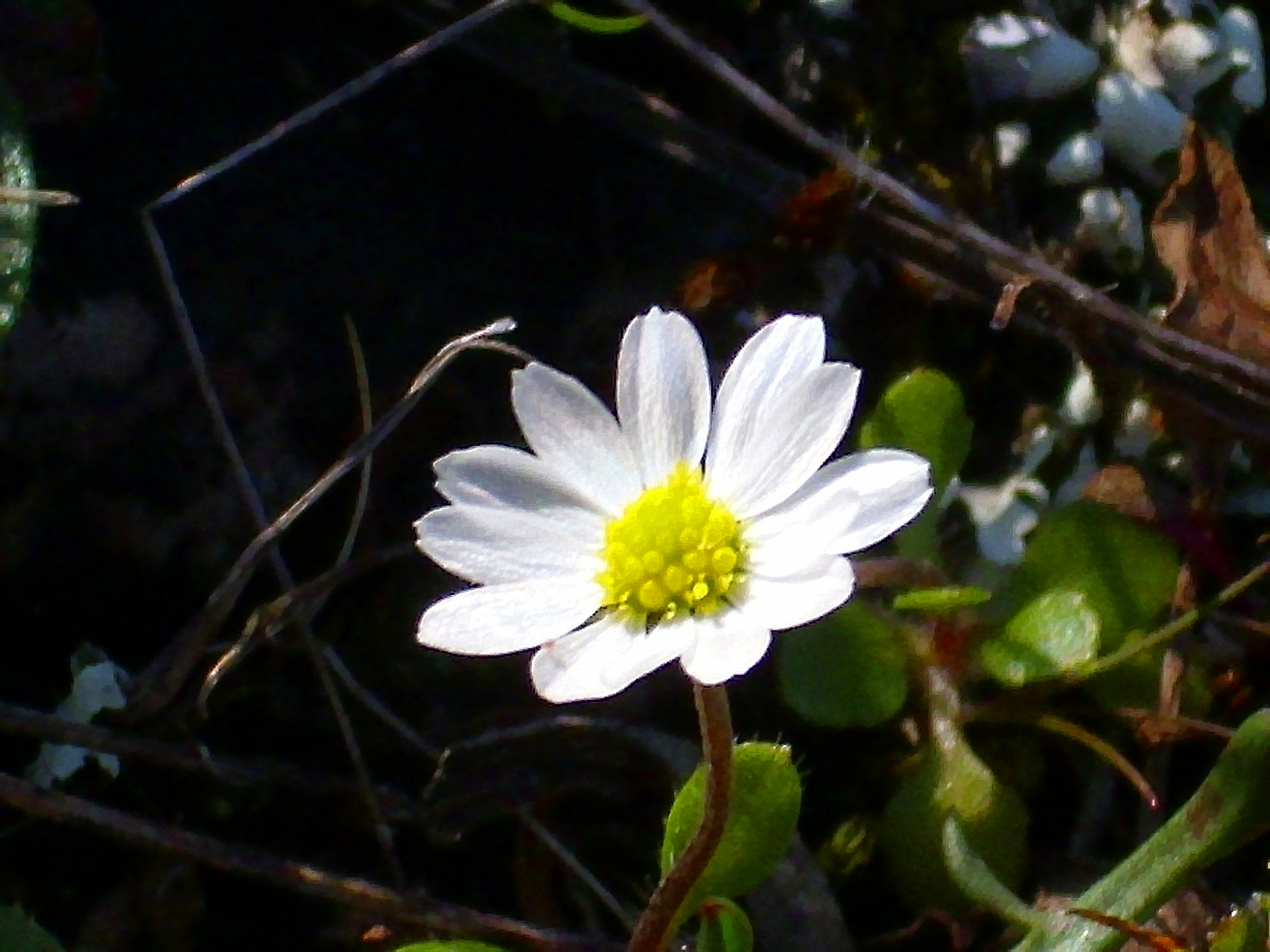
- Bellis annua subsp. microcephala close up, Sierra Madrona, Spain

Scientific classification
- Kingdom: Plantae
- Clade: Tracheophytes
- Clade: Angiosperms
- Clade: Eudicots
- Clade: Asterids
- Order: Asterales
- Family: Asteraceae
- Genus: Bellis
- Species: B. annua
- Subspecies: B. a. subsp. microcephala

Trinomial name
- Bellis annua subsp. microcephala (Lange) Nyman

Synonyms
- Bellis microcephala Lange; Bellis paschalis Sennen & Mauricio

= Bellis annua subsp. microcephala =

Subspecies of flowering plant

Bellis annua subsp. microcephala is a species of daisy in the genus Bellis and is a subspecies of Bellis annua. It is endemic to parts of western Europe and north Africa.
