= Bellis sylvestris subsp. pappulosa =

Scientific classification
- Kingdom: Plantae
- Clade: Tracheophytes
- Clade: Angiosperms
- Clade: Eudicots
- Clade: Asterids
- Order: Asterales
- Family: Asteraceae
- Genus: Bellis
- Species: B. sylvestris
- Subspecies: B. s. subsp. pappulosa

Trinomial name
- Bellis sylvestris subsp. pappulosa (L.) Cyr.

Subspecies of flowering plant

Bellis sylvestris subsp. pappulosa is a species of daisy in the genus Bellis and is a subspecies of Bellis sylvestris. It is native to the West Mediterranean, specifically Algeria, France, Morocco, Portugal, and Spain. It is perennial and grows primarily in subtropical biomes.
