= Bellis dubia =

Scientific classification
- Kingdom: Plantae
- Clade: Tracheophytes
- Clade: Angiosperms
- Clade: Eudicots
- Clade: Asterids
- Order: Asterales
- Family: Asteraceae
- Genus: Bellis
- Species: B. dubia

Binomial name
- Bellis dubia Spreng.

Species of flowering plant

Bellis dubia is a flowering plant in the family Asteraceae and is in the genus Bellis.
