= Bellis hyrcanica =

Conservation status
- Least Concern (IUCN 3.1)

Scientific classification
- Kingdom: Plantae
- Clade: Embryophytes
- Clade: Tracheophytes
- Clade: Spermatophytes
- Clade: Angiosperms
- Clade: Eudicots
- Clade: Asterids
- Order: Asterales
- Family: Asteraceae
- Genus: Bellis
- Species: B. hyrcanica

Binomial name
- Bellis hyrcanica Woronow

Species of flowering plant

Bellis hyrcanica is a species of daisy in the genus Bellis. It is native to Azerbaijan and northern Iran.

This species grows mainly in temperate biomes. The name was published in 1916.
