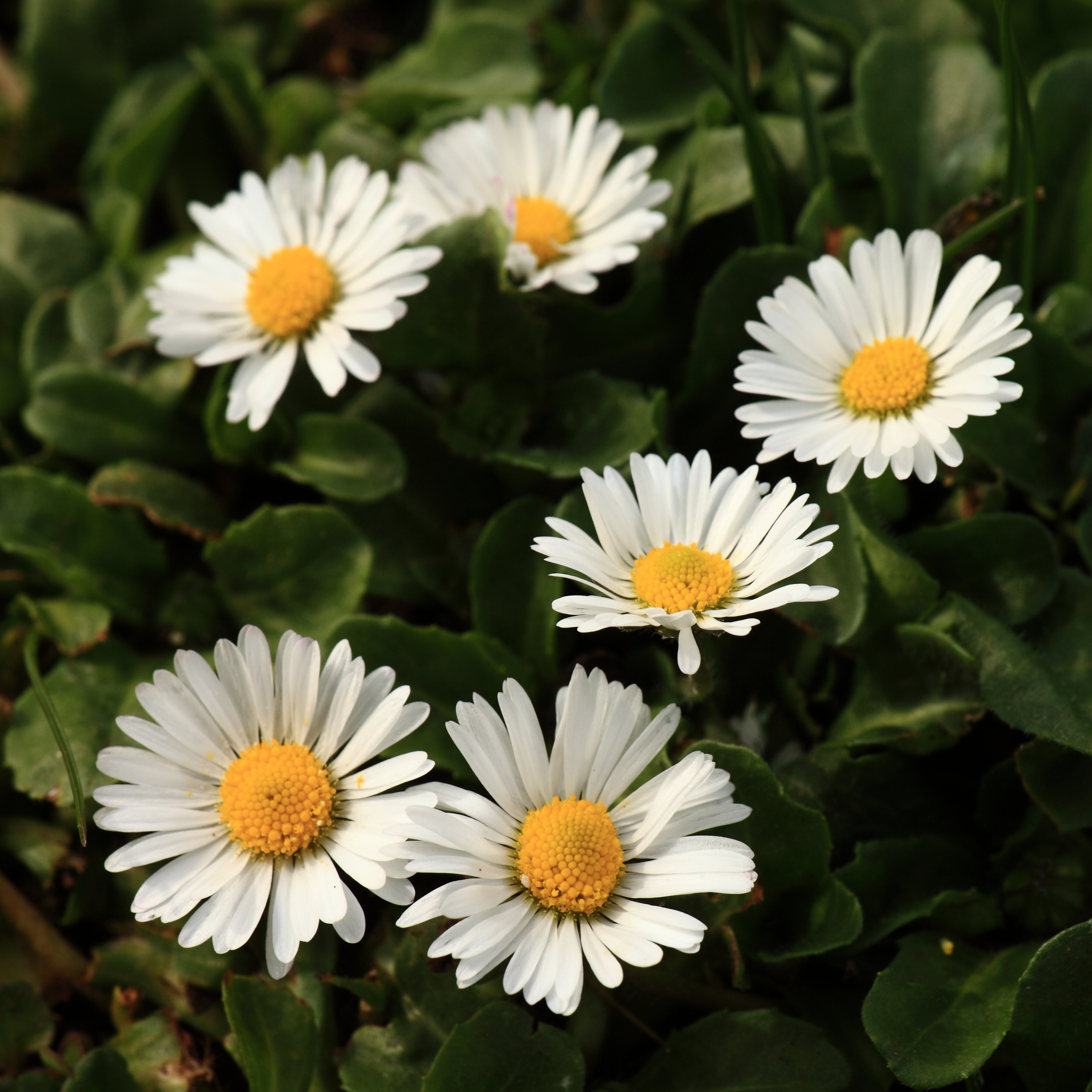

Scientific classification
- Kingdom: Plantae
- Clade: Tracheophytes
- Clade: Angiosperms
- Clade: Eudicots
- Clade: Asterids
- Order: Asterales
- Family: Asteraceae
- Genus: Bellis
- Species: B. pappulosa

Binomial name
- Bellis pappulosa Boiss. ex DC.

= Bellis pappulosa =

Species of flowering plant

Bellis pappulosa is a species of daisy in the genus Bellis. This species is native in Western Europe, Algeria, France, Morocco and Spain.

B. pappulosa is morphologically similar to Bellis sylvestris but has scales on the pappus of the seeds, which are absent in B. sylvestris. Moreover, B. pappulosa is diploid while B. sylvestris is polyploid.
