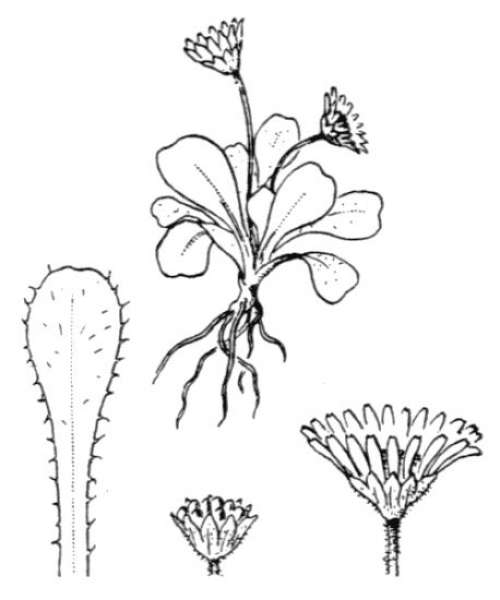
- 1906 illustration by Hippolyte Coste

Conservation status
- Least Concern (IUCN 3.1)

Scientific classification
- Kingdom: Plantae
- Clade: Embryophytes
- Clade: Tracheophytes
- Clade: Spermatophytes
- Clade: Angiosperms
- Clade: Eudicots
- Clade: Asterids
- Order: Asterales
- Family: Asteraceae
- Genus: Bellis
- Species: B. bernardii

Binomial name
- Bellis bernardii Boiss. & Reut.

= Bellis bernardii =

Species of plant

Bellis bernardii, the Corsican daisy, is a member of the family Asteraceae and is an endemic species found in Corsica.
