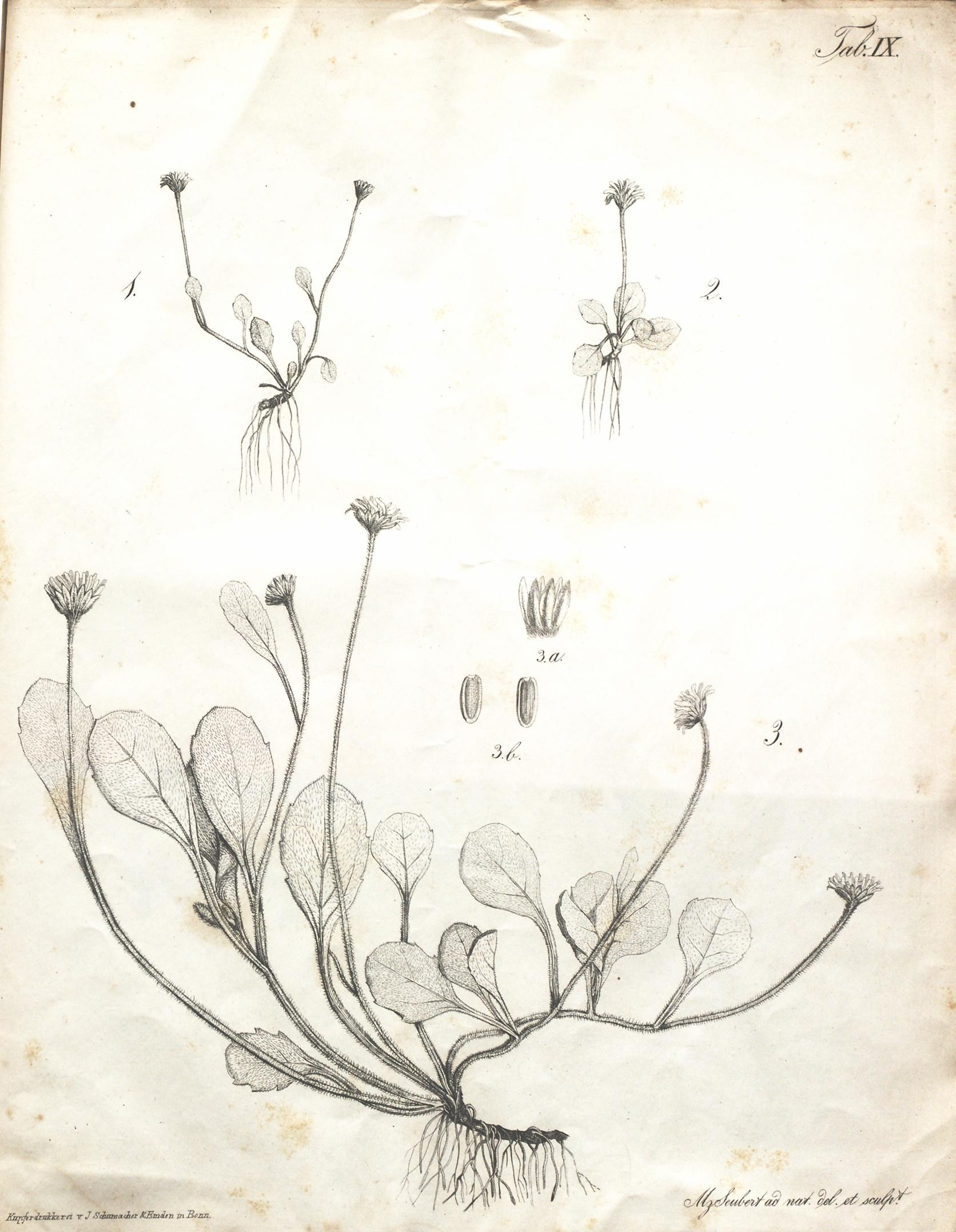

Scientific classification
- Kingdom: Plantae
- Clade: Tracheophytes
- Clade: Angiosperms
- Clade: Eudicots
- Clade: Asterids
- Order: Asterales
- Family: Asteraceae
- Genus: Bellis
- Species: B. azorica

Binomial name
- Bellis azorica Seub.

= Bellis azorica =

Species of flowering plant

Bellis azorica is a species of daisy in the genus Bellis. It is endemic to the Azores.
