= Bellis cordifolia =

Scientific classification
- Kingdom: Plantae
- Clade: Embryophytes
- Clade: Tracheophytes
- Clade: Spermatophytes
- Clade: Angiosperms
- Clade: Eudicots
- Clade: Asterids
- Order: Asterales
- Family: Asteraceae
- Genus: Bellis
- Species: B. cordifolia

Binomial name
- Bellis cordifolia Willk

Species of flowering plant

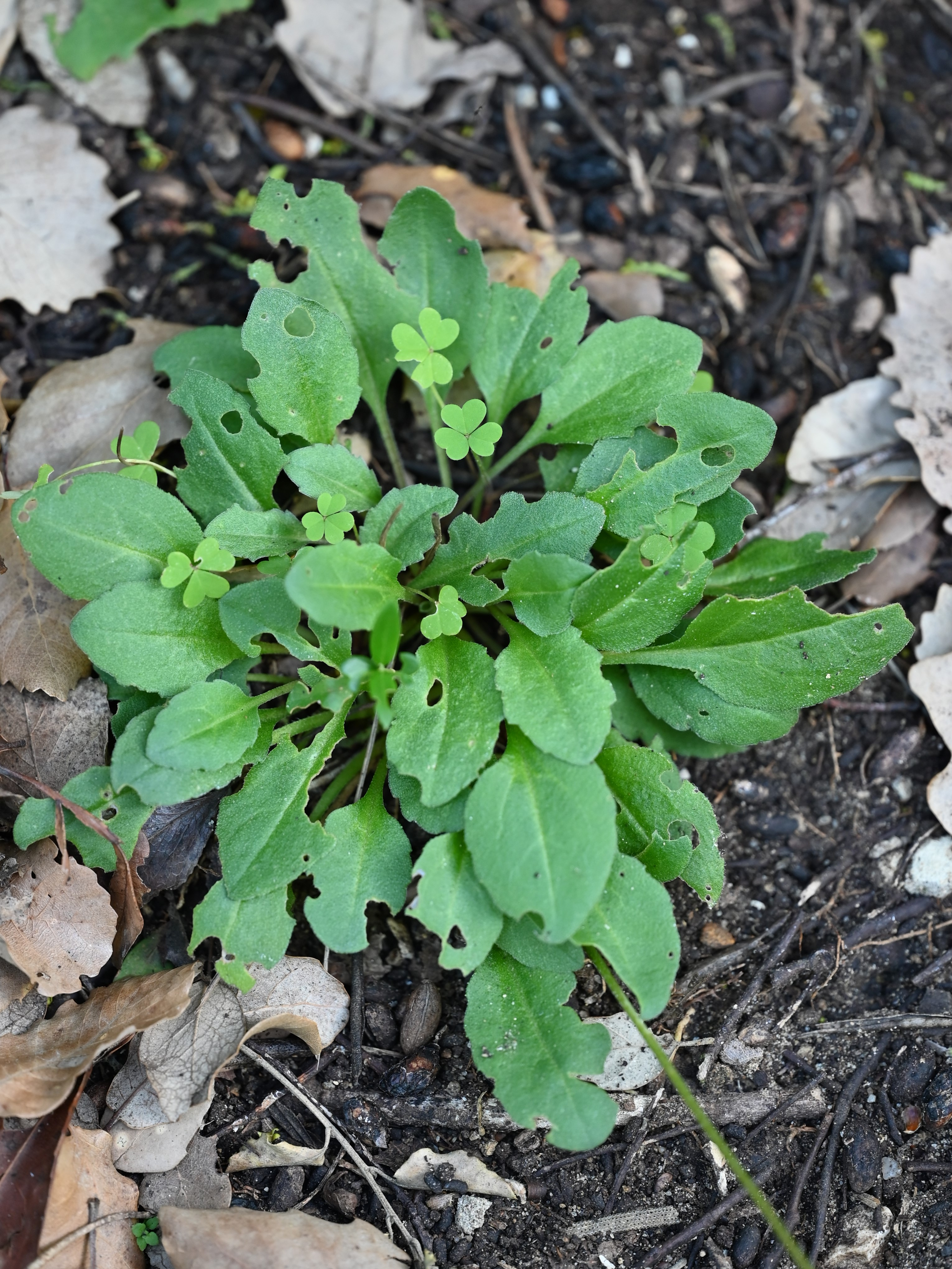
Bellis cordifolia

Bellis cordifolia is a species of daisy in the genus Bellis. It is endemic to Spain.
