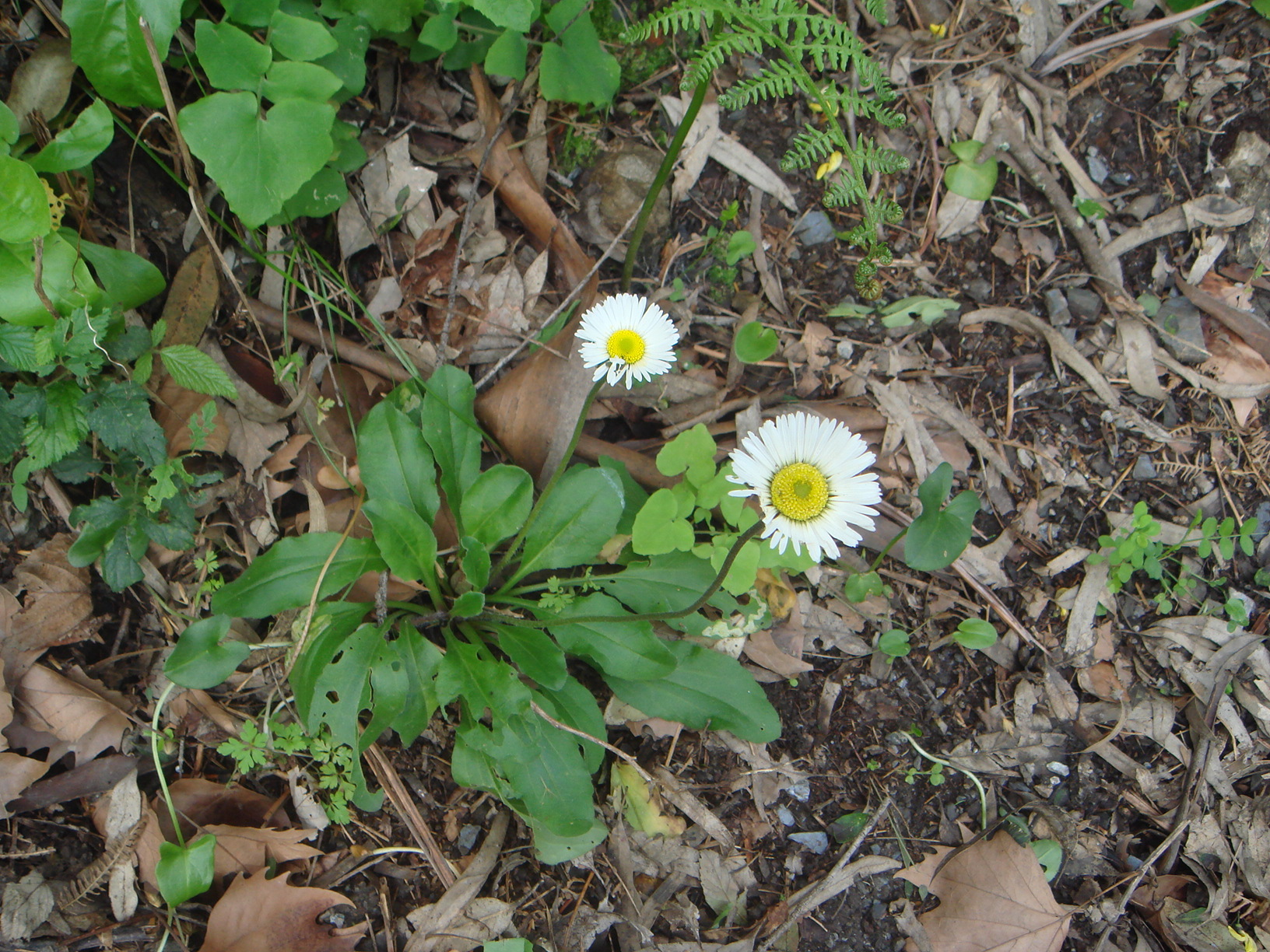

Scientific classification
- Kingdom: Plantae
- Clade: Tracheophytes
- Clade: Angiosperms
- Clade: Eudicots
- Clade: Asterids
- Order: Asterales
- Family: Asteraceae
- Genus: Bellis
- Species: B. rotundifolia

Binomial name
- Bellis rotundifolia Boiss. & Reut. 1852

Synonyms
- Arnica rotundifolia Willd. Bellidium rotundifolium Bertol. Belliopsis rotundifolia Pomel; Bellium giganteum Cass. Bellium rotundifolium DC. Doronicum rotundifolium Desf.

= Bellis rotundifolia =

Species of flowering plant

Bellis rotundifolia is a species of flowering plant in the family Asteraceae. It is native to Algeria and Morocco. The epithet rotundifolia is from Neo-Latin rotundus ("round") plus folium ("leaf").
