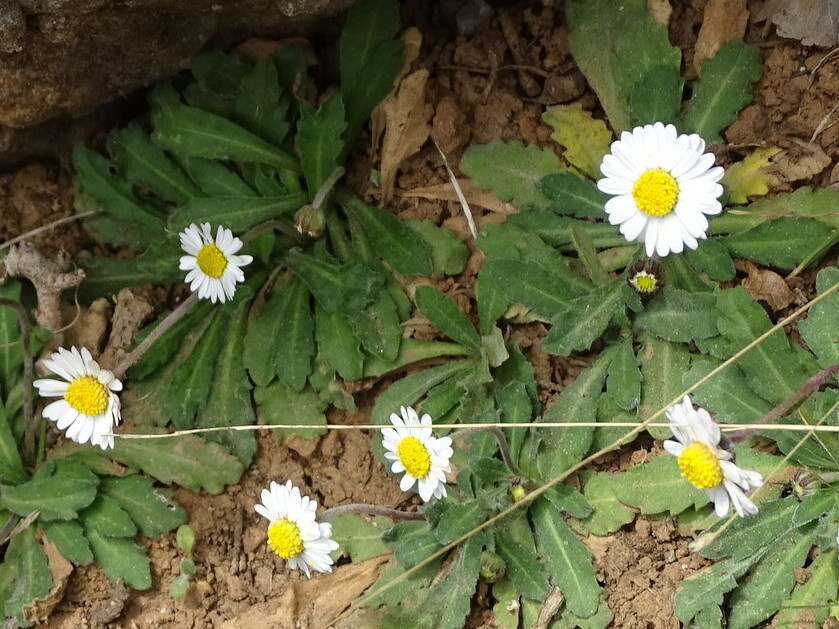

Conservation status
- Near Threatened (IUCN 3.1)

Scientific classification
- Kingdom: Plantae
- Clade: Embryophytes
- Clade: Tracheophytes
- Clade: Angiosperms
- Clade: Eudicots
- Clade: Asterids
- Order: Asterales
- Family: Asteraceae
- Genus: Bellis
- Species: B. longifolia

Binomial name
- Bellis longifolia Boiss. & Heldr.

= Bellis longifolia =

Species of flowering plant

Bellis longifolia is a species of flowering plant in the family Asteraceae. It is endemic to Crete.
