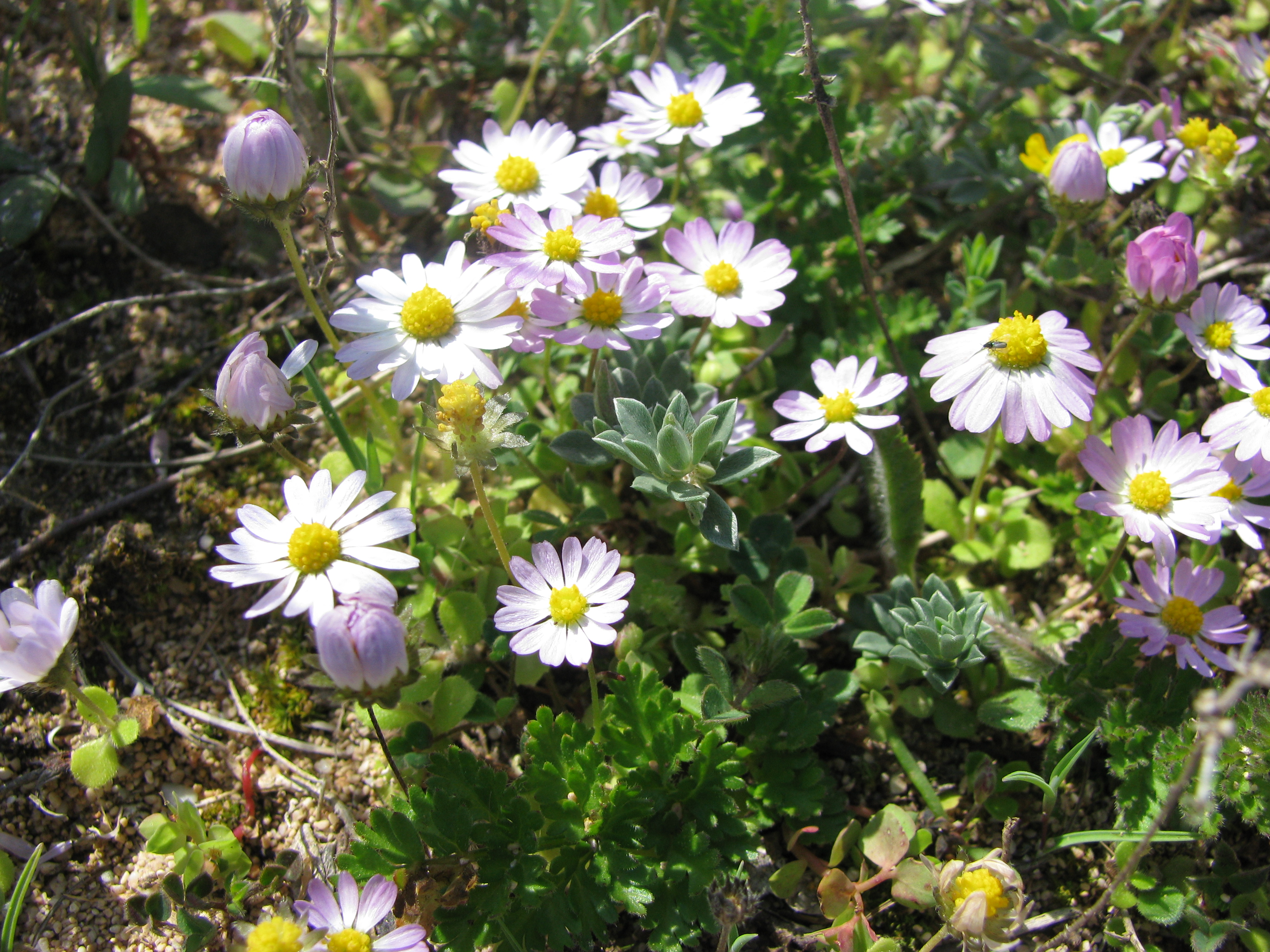

Scientific classification
- Kingdom: Plantae
- Clade: Tracheophytes
- Clade: Angiosperms
- Clade: Eudicots
- Clade: Asterids
- Order: Asterales
- Family: Asteraceae
- Genus: Bellis
- Species: B. annua

Binomial name
- Bellis annua L.

= Bellis annua =

Species of flowering plant

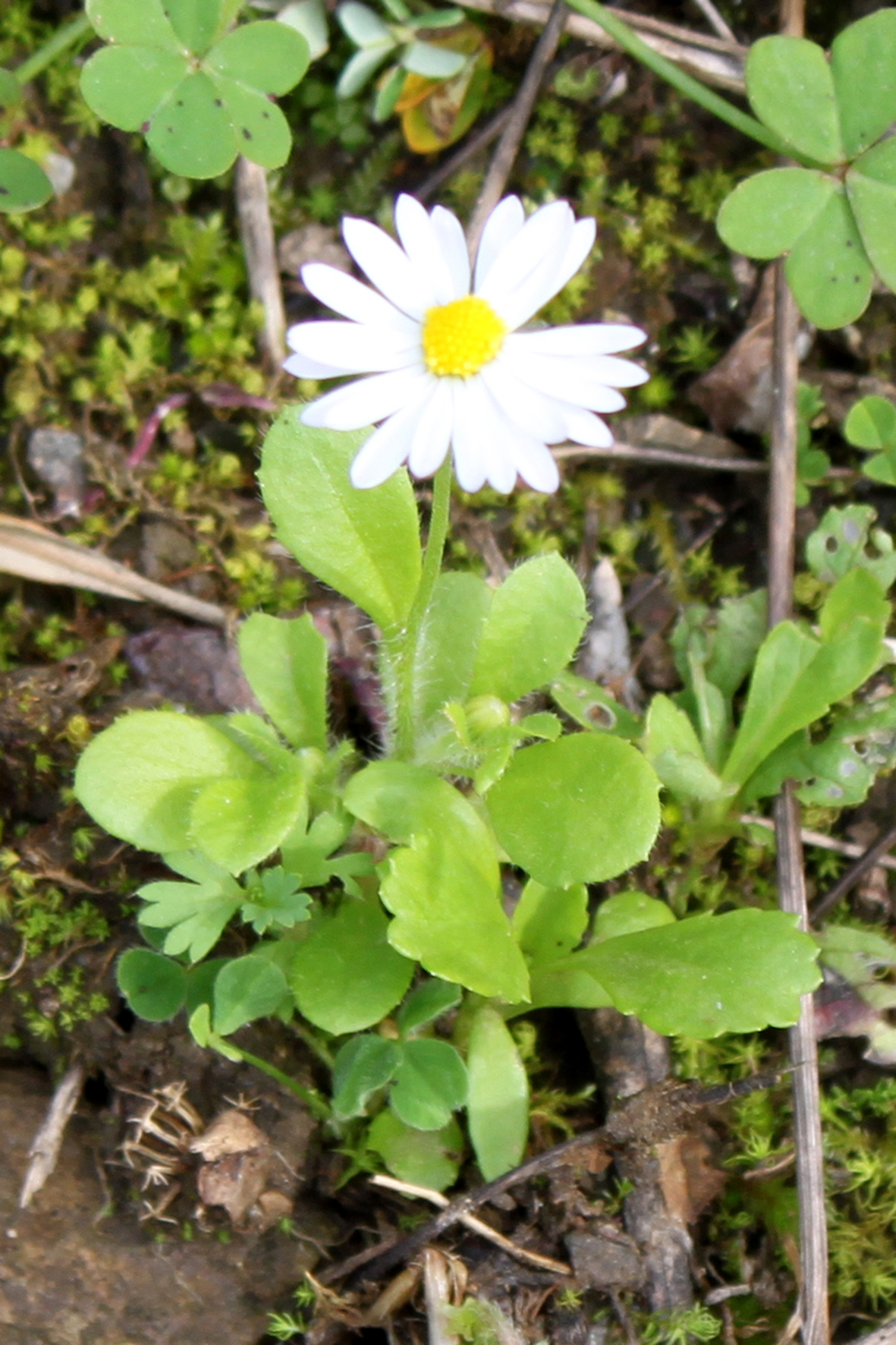
Showing leaf on stem and teeth

Bellis annua, the annual daisy, is a small daisy species native to Mediterranean countries eastward to Iran.

== Description and Range ==
A small, annual daisy, often little-hairy, with a few small leaves, and small flower heads. The leaves may be distinctly-toothed, and may occur on the flower stem (check several plants). The seeds (achenes) are finely-short hairy.

Native to Mediterranean countries and eastward to Iran.

subsp. annua has leaves to 2.5 cm and flower heads to 1.5 cm with 20-30 ray petals. Range as per species

subsp. vandasii (Velen.) D. A. Webb has larger leaves (to 5 cm) and larger flower heads (1.2-2 cm), range Central Bulgaria - listed in Flora Europaea but not on Plants of the World.

subsp. microcephala (Lange) Nyman has very small flower heads (5-10 mm) with acute hispid involucral bracts under the flowerhead. Native to Algeria, Libya, Morocco, Portugal, Spain, Tunisia.

subsp. minuta (DC.) Meikle has shortened ray petals. Native to Cyprus, Italy, Kriti, Palestine, Sardegna. Those on Cyprus being generally this subsp.

== Similar Species ==
Some similar species include -

B. perennis - Perennial with larger often fairly dense leaves (to 6 cm) that are not on the stem and usually not pointedly-toothed. It has a larger flower head (1.5-3 cm) with more ray petals (30-50).

B. sylvestris - Perennial, like B. perennis but with longer flower stems (10-45 cm) and longer (3-18 cm) leaves with 3 veins that gradually narrow to their base, and slightly larger flower head (2-4 cm).

== Gallery ==
Bellis Annua also known as Lesser Daisy, botanical print from the Curtis's Botanical Magazine, 1820. Copper engraving by Weddell from an illustration by J Curtis.
