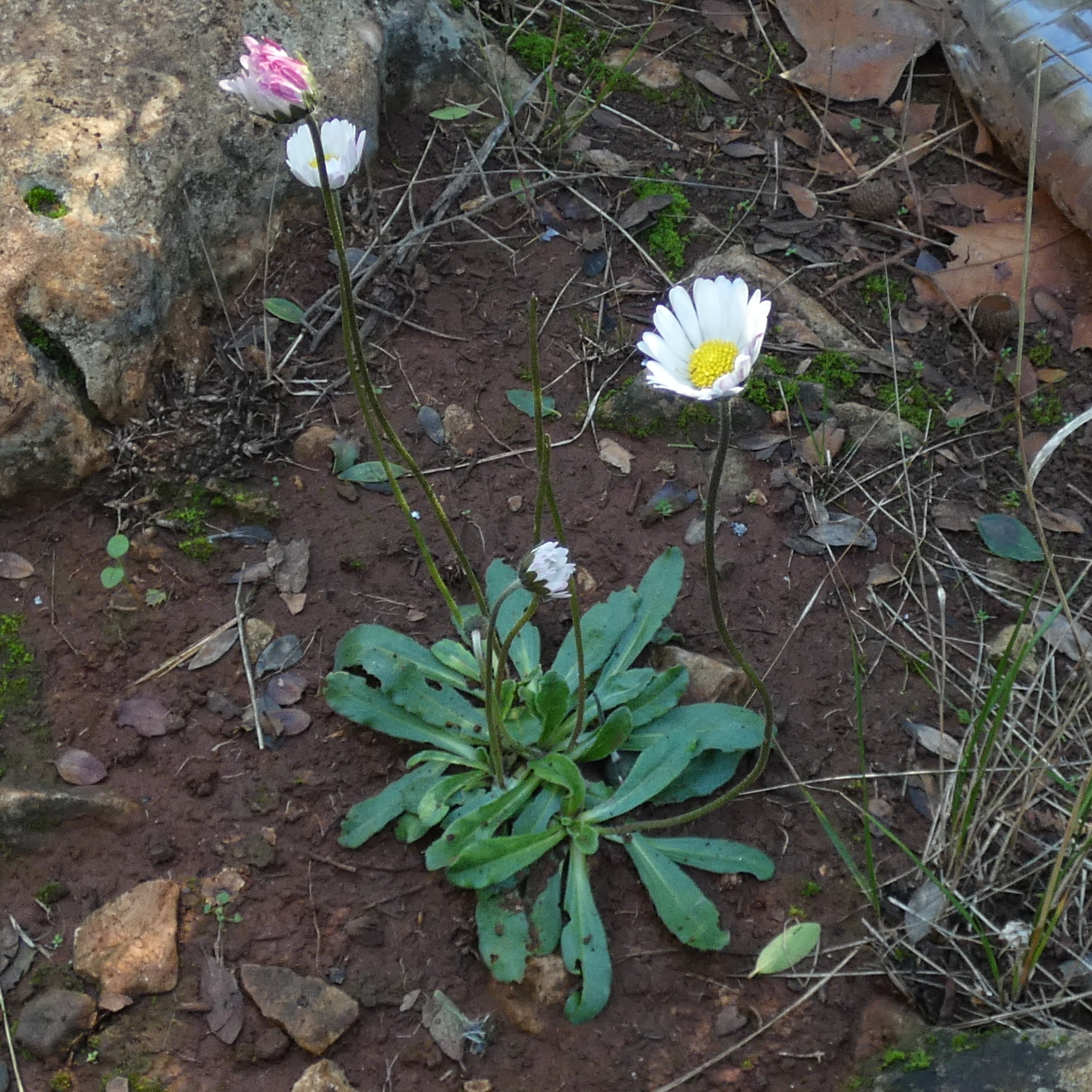

Scientific classification
- Kingdom: Plantae
- Clade: Tracheophytes
- Clade: Angiosperms
- Clade: Eudicots
- Clade: Asterids
- Order: Asterales
- Family: Asteraceae
- Genus: Bellis
- Species: B. sylvestris

Binomial name
- Bellis sylvestris Cirillo

Synonyms
- Bellis atlantica Boiss. & Reut.; Bellis hirta Host; Bellis longifolia Orph. ex Nyman; Brachyscome sylvestris Klatt; Doronicum bellidiastrum Sm.

= Bellis sylvestris =

Species of flowering plant

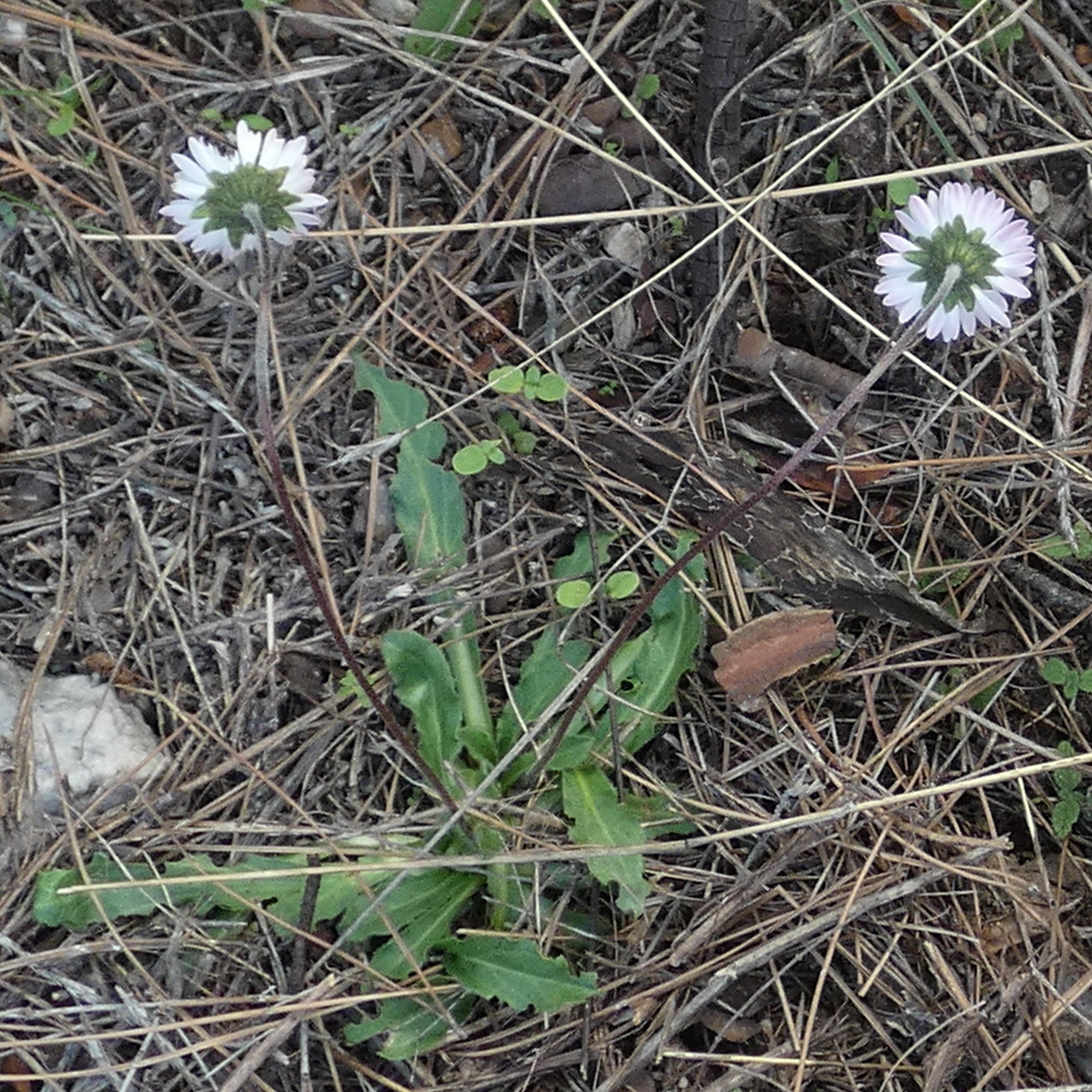
Overall form, backside

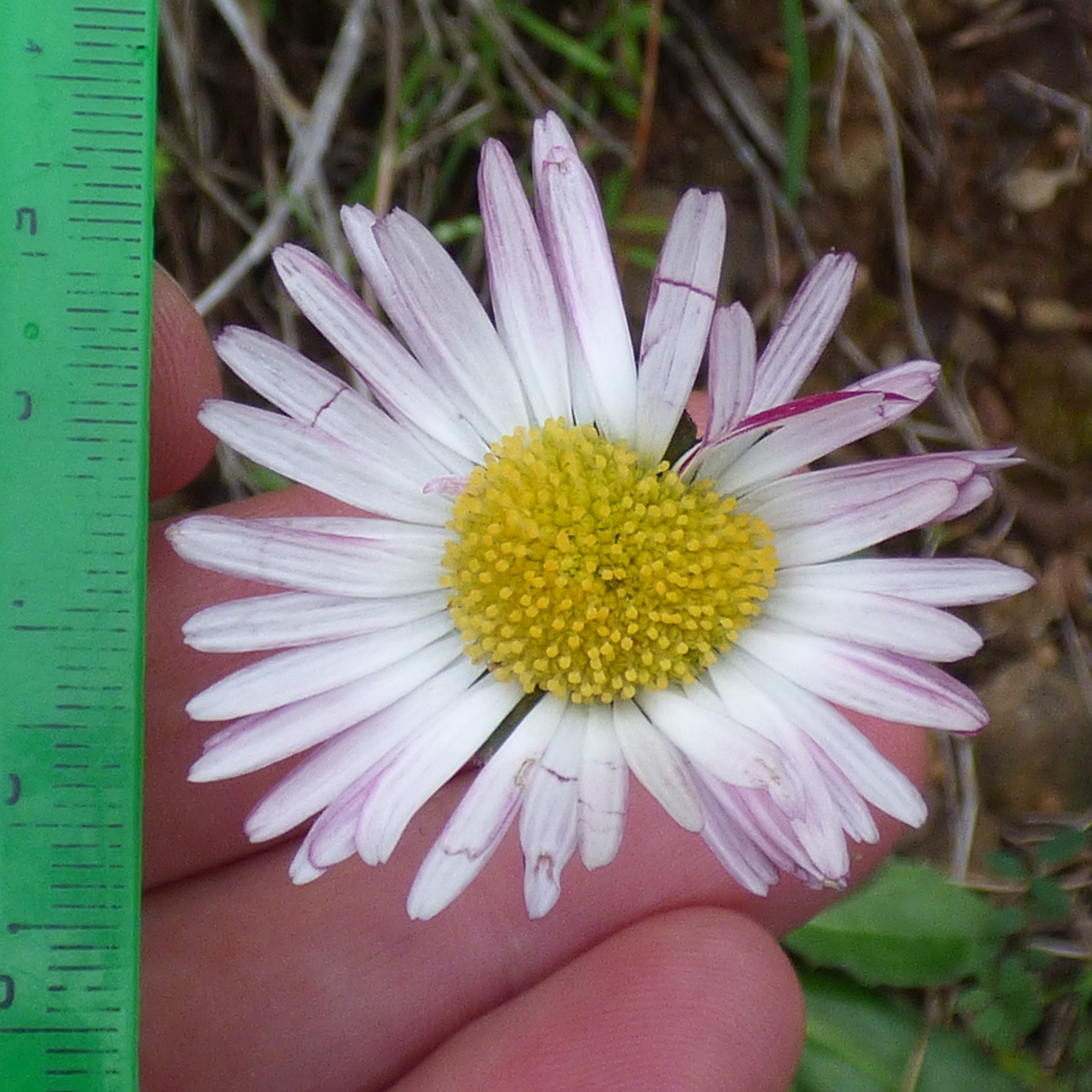
Flower face

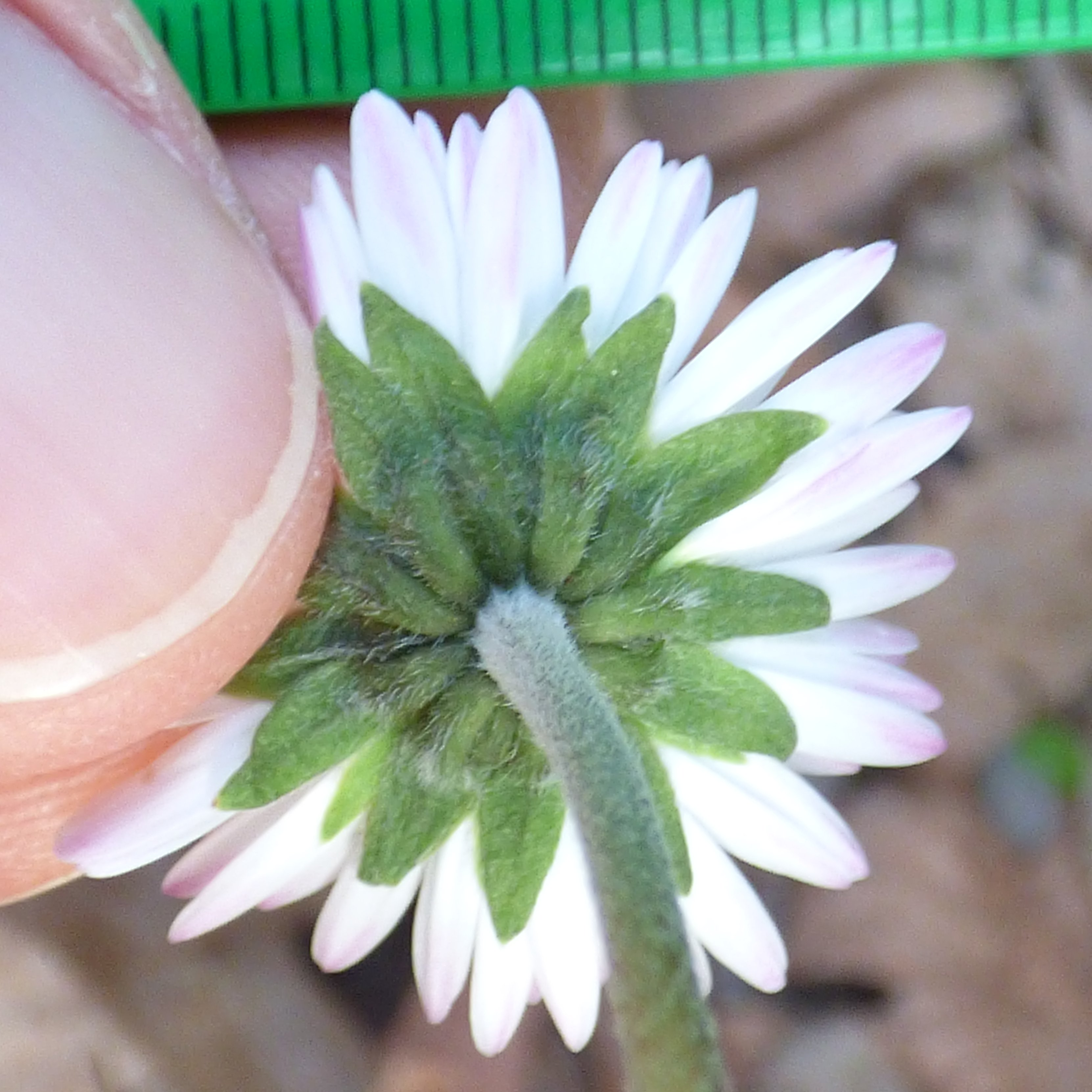
Flower backside

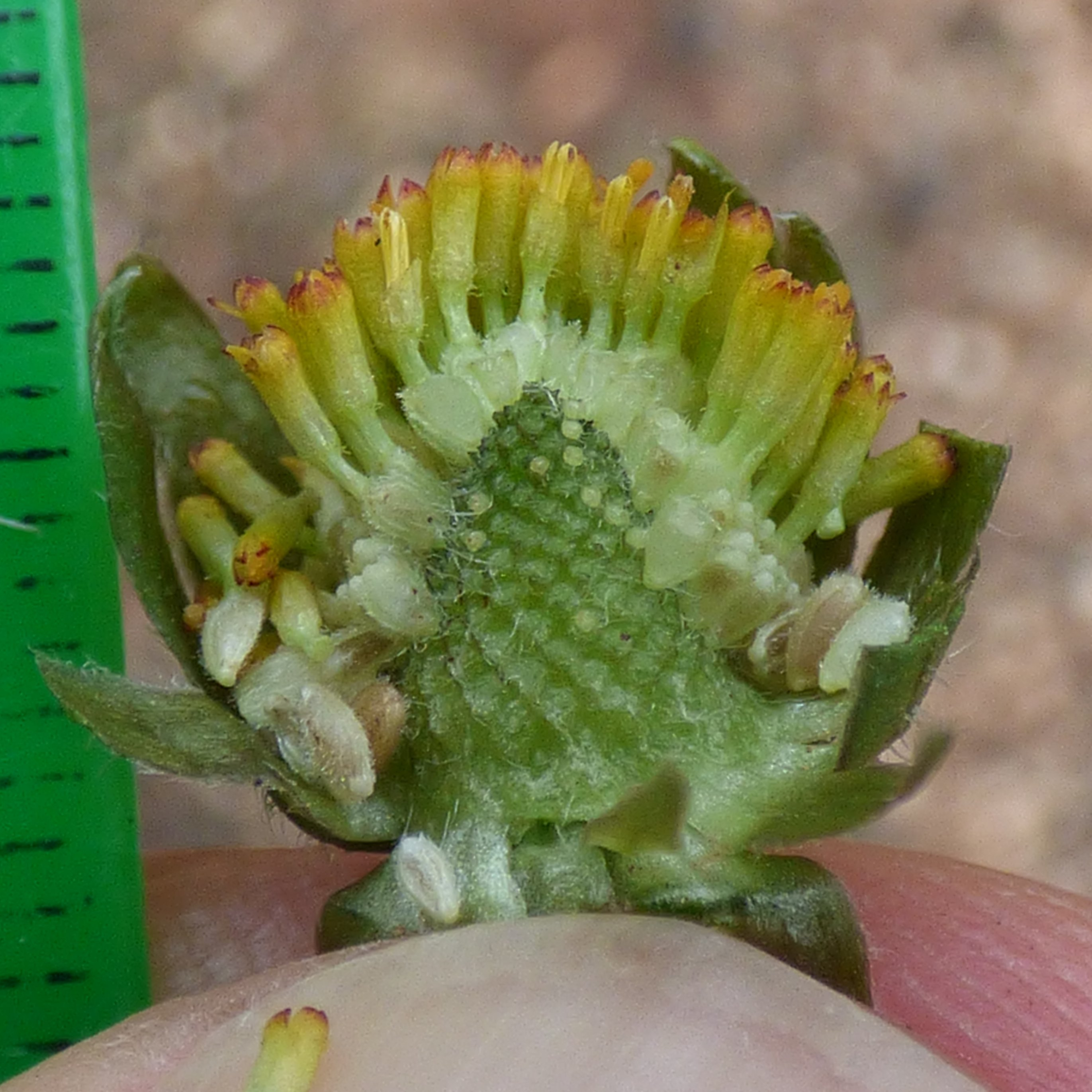
Maturing flower head becoming conical

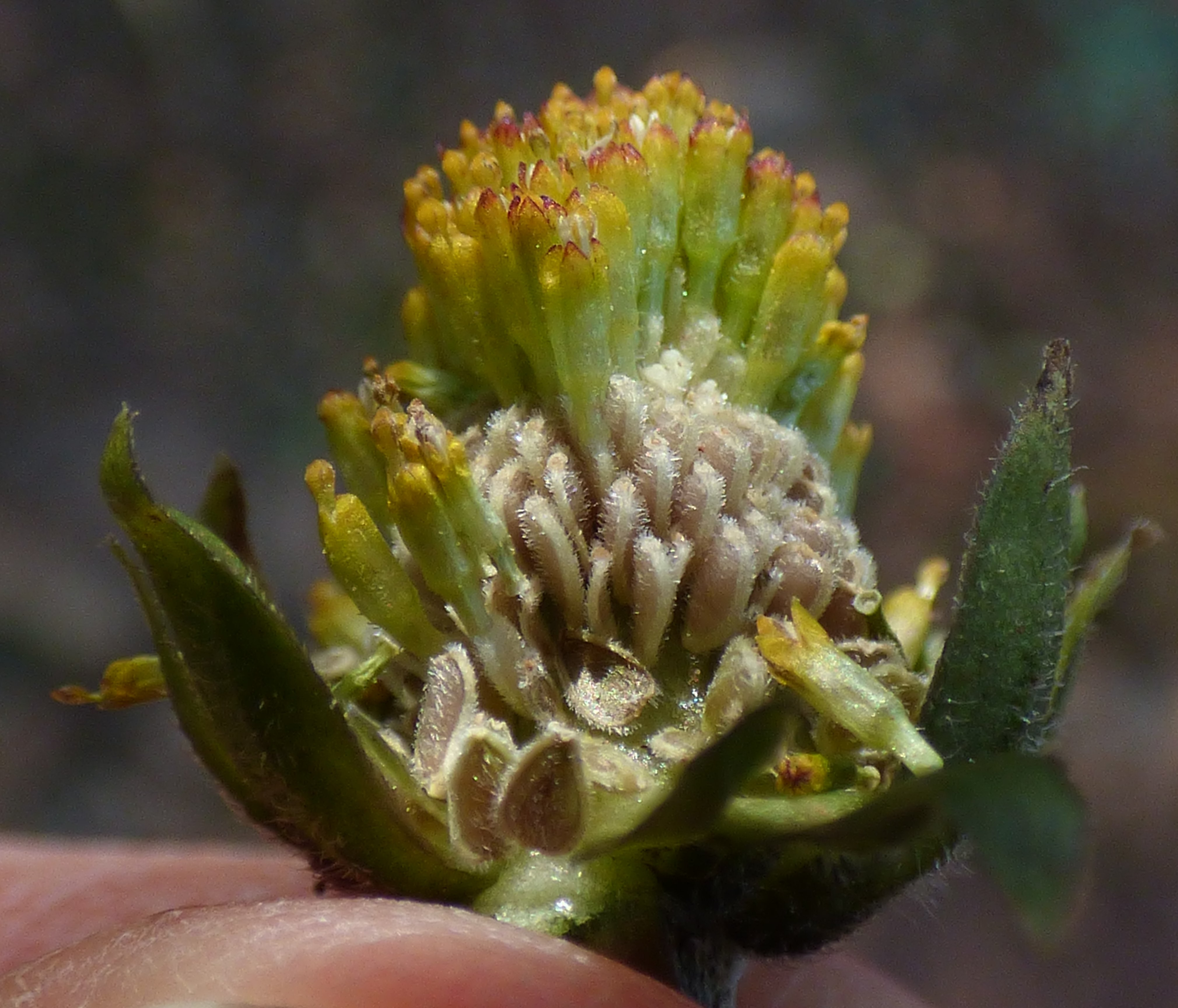
Flower seeding

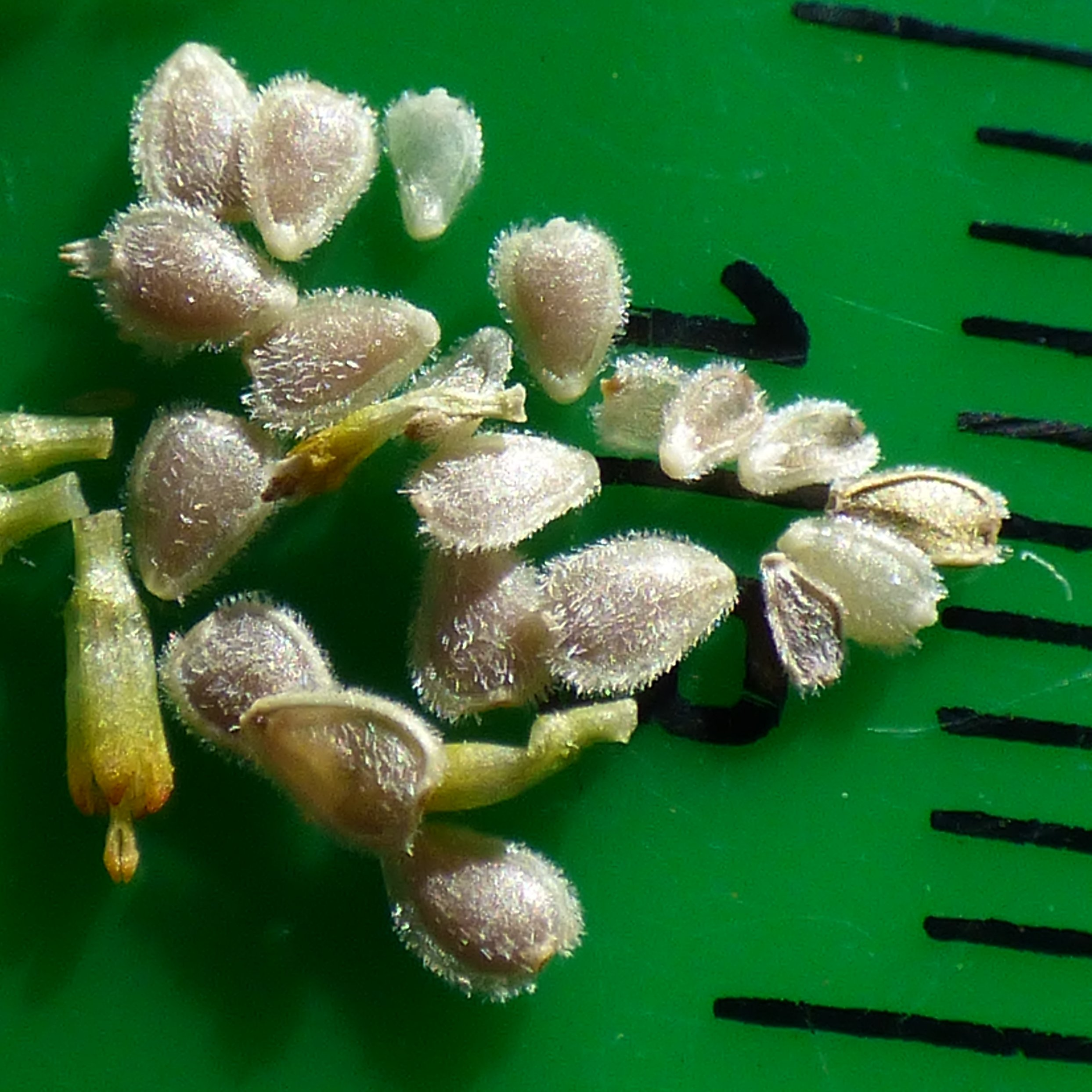
Seeds (achenes)

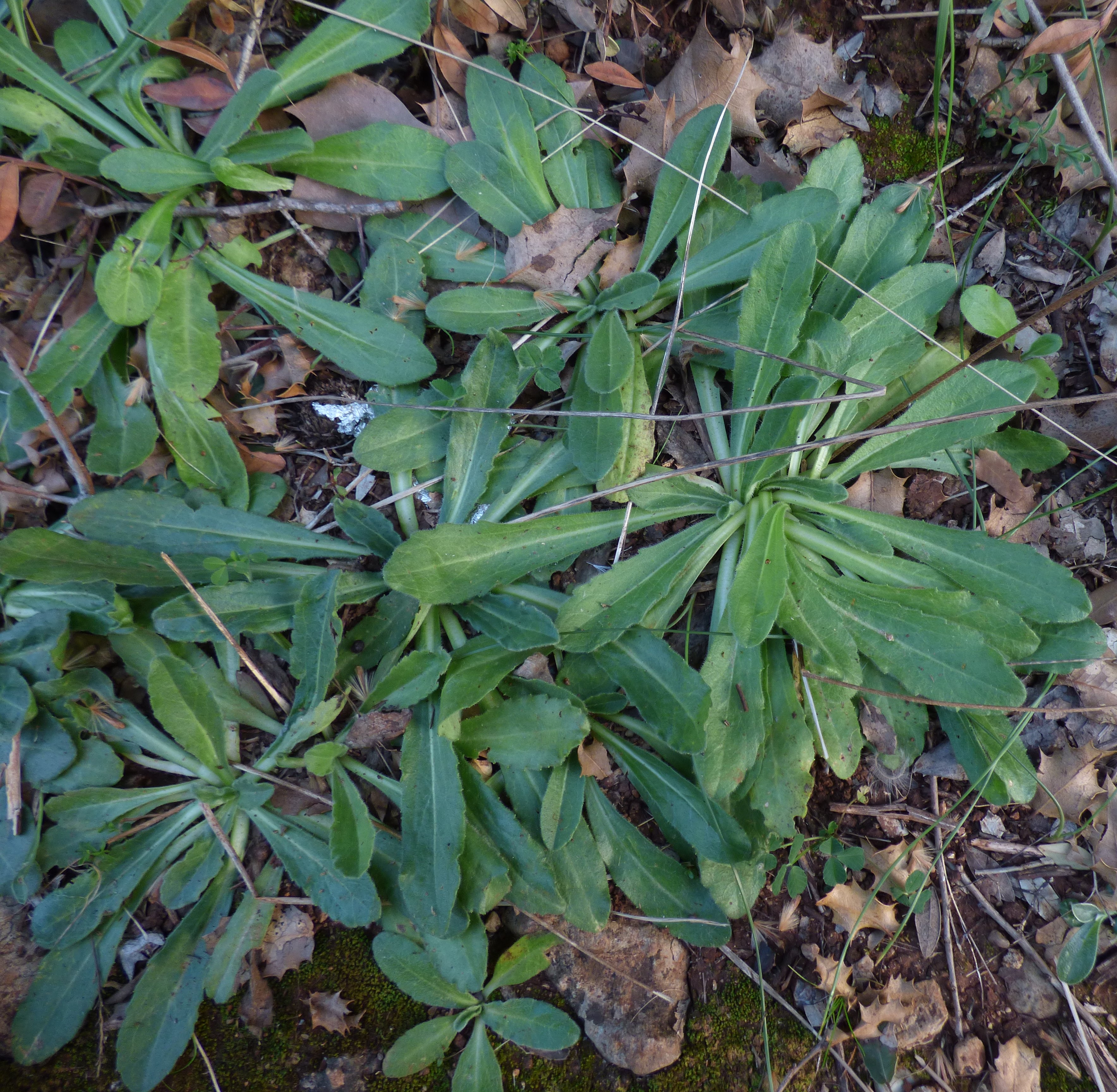
Long teaves tapering to base, showing 3 lengthwise veins

Bellis sylvestris, the southern daisy, is a species of the genus Bellis. It is a perennial plant native to central and southern Europe, the Middle East, and north Africa, and grows up to fifteen centimetres (six inches) tall. The name sylvestris comes from the word silvestris meaning "living in the woods" in Latin.

== Characteristics ==
The southern daisy's creeping roots are rhizomes. what we usually call flower is an inflorescence composed of tens or hundreds of minuscule flowers. Those on the outside are white with a ligule. Those on the inside are yellow tube-shaped. The plant bears fruits called achenes.

B. sylvestris is morphologically similar to Bellis pappulosa but has no scales on the pappus of the seeds, unlike B. pappulosa. Moreover, B. pappulosa is diploid while B. sylvestris is polyploid.
