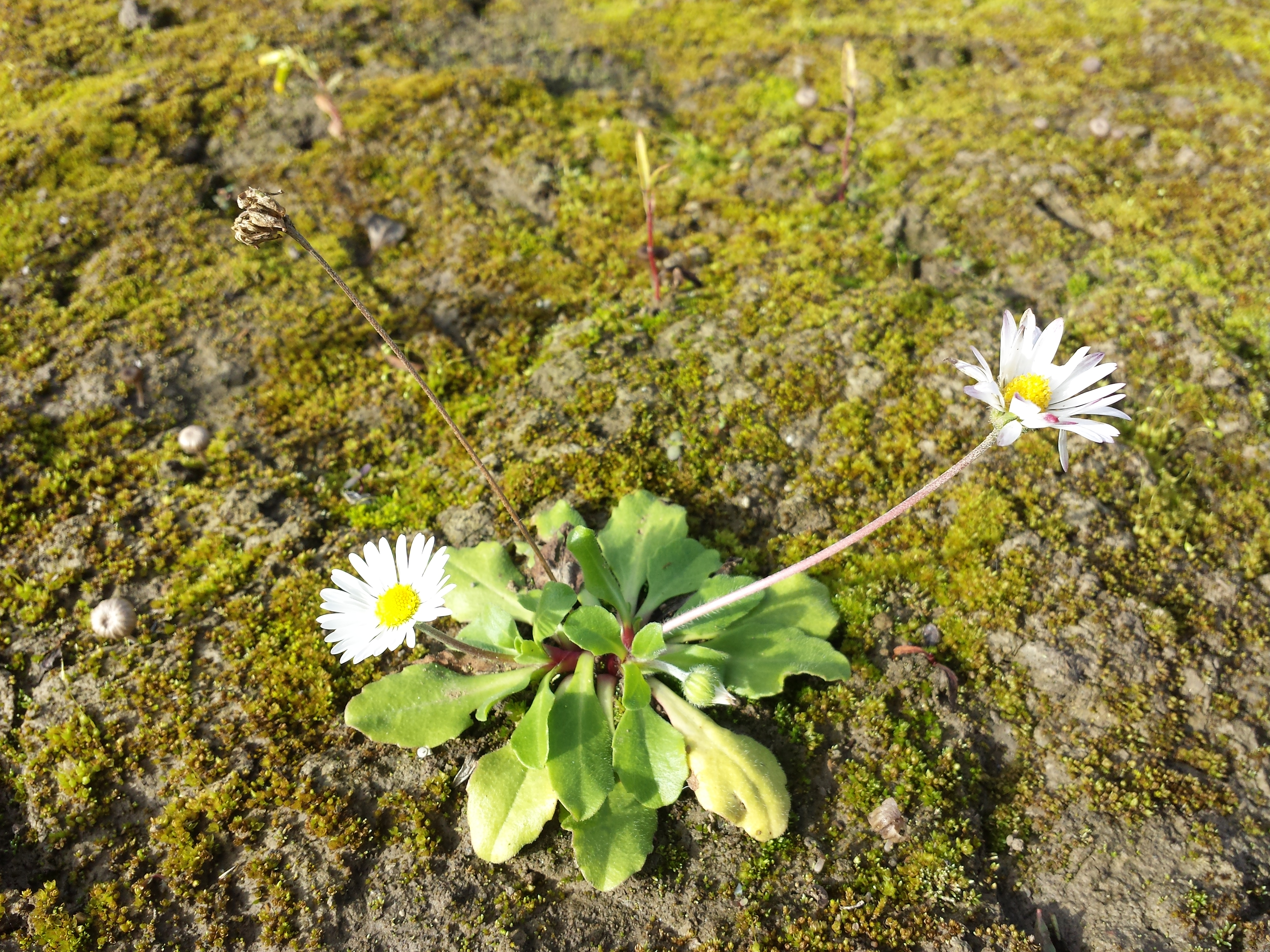

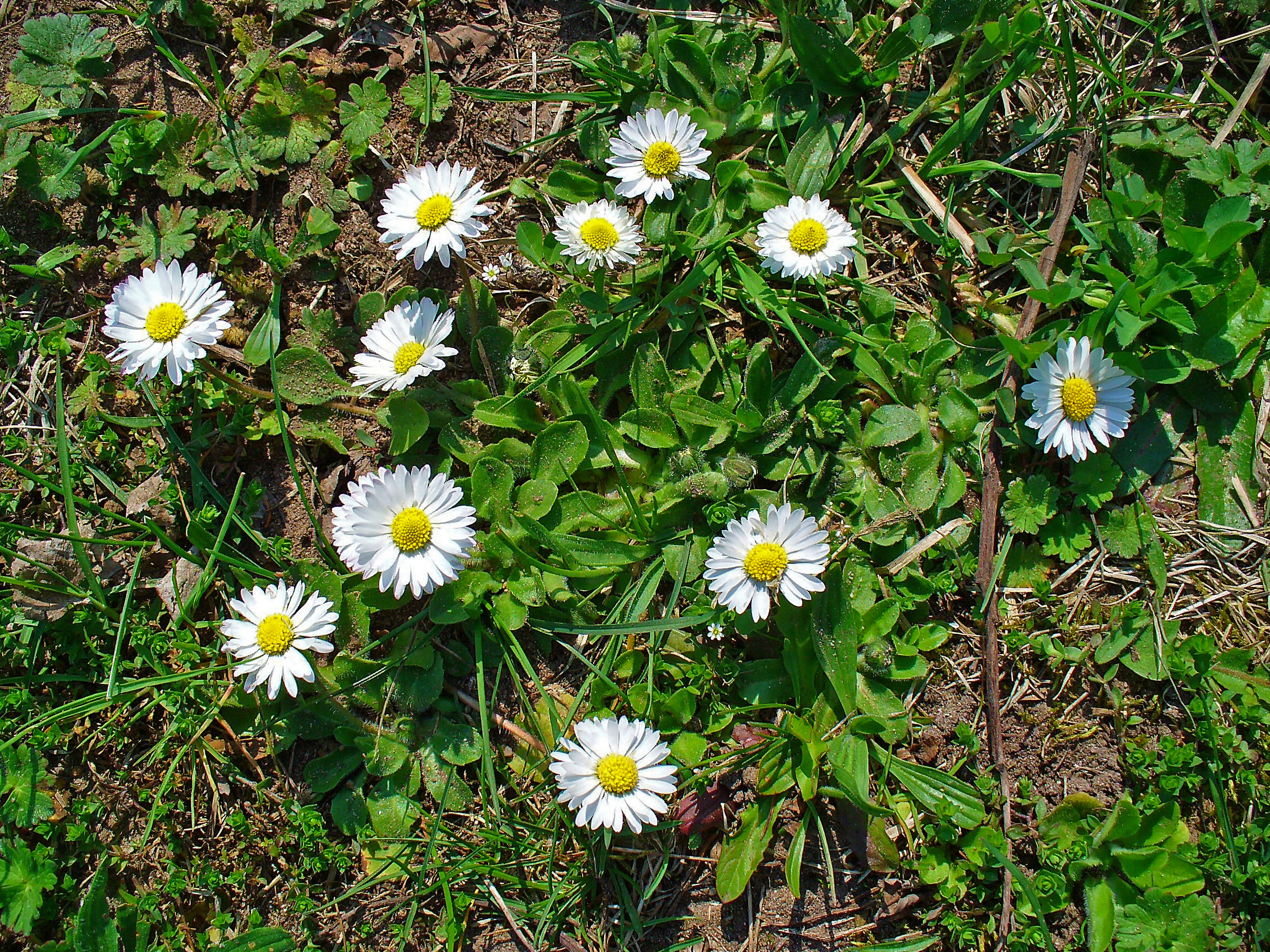

Scientific classification
- Kingdom: Plantae
- Clade: Tracheophytes
- Clade: Angiosperms
- Clade: Eudicots
- Clade: Asterids
- Order: Asterales
- Family: Asteraceae
- Genus: Bellis
- Species: B. perennis

Binomial name
- Bellis perennis L.

Synonyms
- Aster bellis E.H.L.Krause; Bellis alpina Hegetschw.; B. armena Boiss.; B. croatica Gand.; B. hortensis Mill.; B. hybrida Ten.; B. integrifolia DC. 1786 not Michx. 1803; B. margaritifolia Huter; B. minor Garsault (nom inval.); B. perennis var. caulescens Rochebr.; B. p. f. discoidea D.C.McClint.; B. p. var. fagetorum Lacaita; B. p. var. hybrida (Ten.) Fiori; B. p. subsp. hybrida (Ten.) Nyman; B. p. var. margaritifolia (Huter) Fiori; B. p. var. microcephala Boiss.; B. p. f. plena Sacc.; B. p. f. pumila (Arv.-Touv. & Dupuy) Rouy; B. p. var. pusilla N.Terracc.; B. p. f. rhodoglossa Sacc.; B. p. var. strobliana Bég.; B. p. var. subcaulescens Martrin-Donos; B. p. var. tubulosa F.J.Schultz; B. p. f. tubulosa A.Kern.; B. pumila Arv.-Touv. & Dupuy; B. pusilla (N.Terracc.) Pignatti; B. scaposa Gilib. (nom inval.); B. validula Gand.; Erigeron perennis (L.) Sessé & Moc.

= Bellis perennis =

Species of plant in the daisy family

Bellis perennis (/ˈbɛlɪs pəˈrɛnɪs/ BEL-iss pə-REN-iss), the daisy, is a European species of the family Asteraceae, often considered the archetypal species of the name daisy. To distinguish this species from other plants known as daisies, it is sometimes qualified or known as common daisy, lawn daisy or English daisy.

== Description ==
Bellis perennis is a perennial herbaceous plant growing to 20 centimetres (8 inches) in height. It has short creeping rhizomes and rosettes of small rounded or spoon-shaped leaves that are from 2 to 5 cm (3/4–2 in) long and grow flat to the ground. The species habitually colonises lawns and is difficult to eradicate by mowing, hence the term 'lawn daisy'.

The plant blooms from March to September and exhibits the phenomenon of heliotropism, in which the flowers follow the position of the sun in the sky. The flower heads are composite, about 2 to 3 cm (3/4–1 1/4 in) in diameter, in the form of a pseudanthium, consisting of many sessile flowers with white ray florets (often tipped red) and yellow disc florets. Each inflorescence is borne on a single leafless stem 2 to 10 cm (3/4–4 in), rarely 15 cm (6 in) tall. The capitulum, or disc of florets, is surrounded by two rows of green bracts known as "phyllaries". The achenes are without pappus.

== Etymology ==
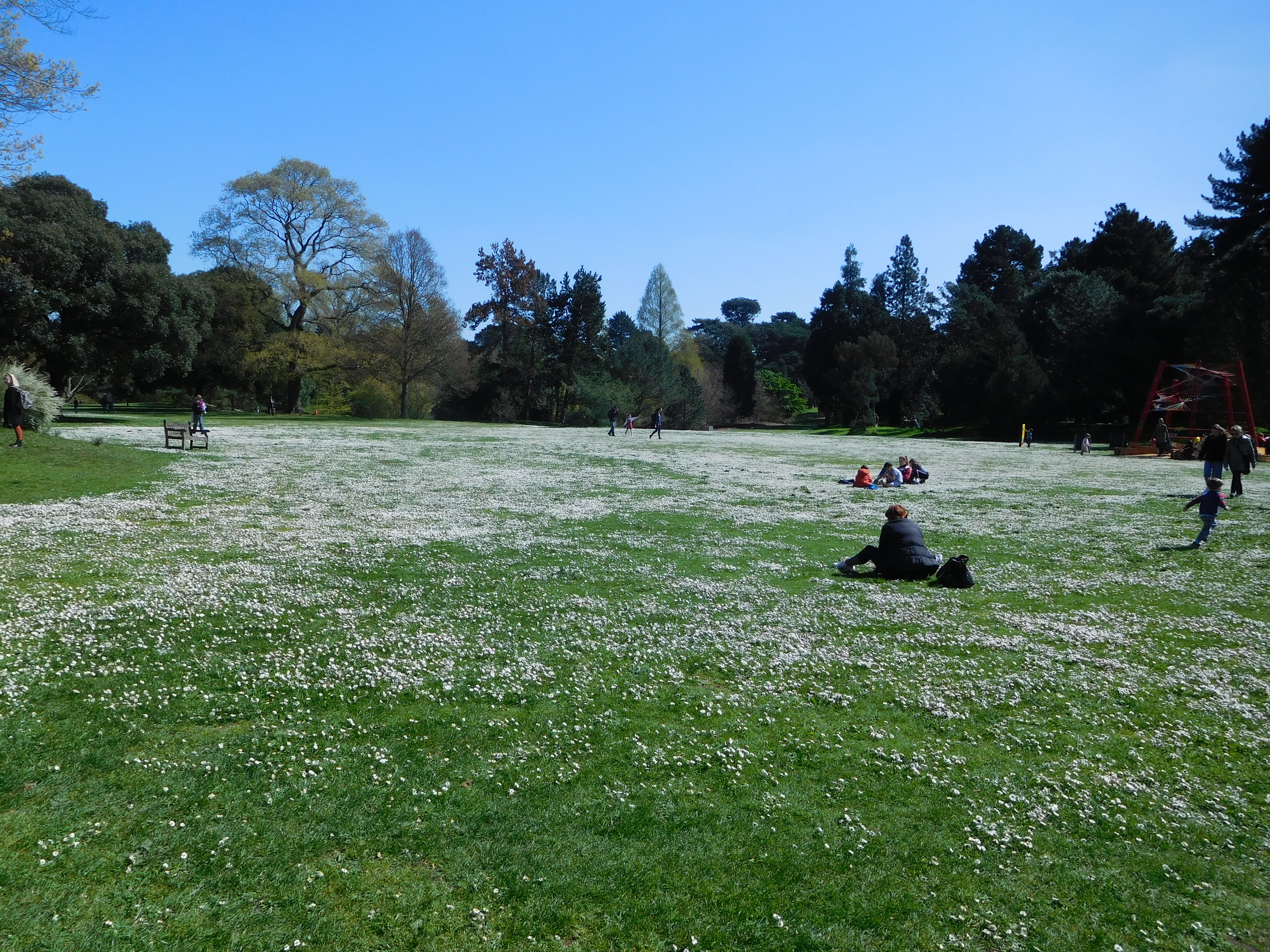
Well-trodden meadow at London's Kew Gardens, the grass white with daisies

Bellis may come from bellus, Latin for "pretty", and perennis is Latin for "everlasting".

The name "daisy", possibly originating with this plant, is considered a corruption of "day's eye", because the whole head closes at night and opens in the morning. Geoffrey Chaucer called it "eye of the day". In medieval times, Bellis perennis or the English Daisy was commonly known as "Mary's Rose".

Historically, the plant has also been widely known as bruisewort, and occasionally woundwort (although this name is now more closely associated with the genus Stachys). It is also known as bone flower.

== Distribution and habitat ==
Bellis perennis is native to western, central and northern Europe, including remote islands such as the Faroe Islands, but has become widely naturalised in most temperate regions, including the Americas and Australasia. It prefers field-like habitats.

== Cultivation ==
The species generally blooms from early to midsummer, although when grown under ideal conditions, it has a very long flowering season and will even produce a few flowers in the middle of mild winters.

It can generally be grown where minimum temperatures are above −35 °C (−30 °F), in full sun to partial shade conditions, and requires little or no maintenance. It has no known serious insect or disease problems and can generally be grown in most well-drained soils. The plant may be propagated either by seed after the last frost, or by division after flowering.

Though not native to the United States, the species is still considered a valuable ground cover in certain garden settings (e.g., as part of English or cottage inspired gardens, as well as spring meadows where low growth and some colour is desired in parallel with minimal care and maintenance while helping to crowd out noxious weeds once established and naturalised).

Numerous single- and double-flowered varieties are in cultivation, producing flat or spherical blooms in a range of sizes (1 to 6 cm or 3/8 to 2 3/8 in) and colours (red, pink and white). They are generally grown from seed as biennial bedding plants. They can also be purchased as plugs in spring.

It has been reported to be mostly self-fertilizing, but some plants may be self-sterile.

== Uses ==
Bellis perennis may be used as a potherb. The young leaves can be eaten raw in salads or cooked, but the leaves become increasingly astringent with age. Flower buds and petals can be eaten raw in sandwiches, soups and salads. It is also used as a tea and as a vitamin supplement.

B. perennis has astringent properties and has been used in herbal medicine.

Daisies have traditionally been used for making daisy chains in children's games.

== In culture ==
Daisy is used as a feminine name, and sometimes as a nickname for people named Margaret, after the French name for the oxeye daisy, marguerite.

The daisy is the national flower of the Netherlands.

== Gallery ==
Bellis perennis

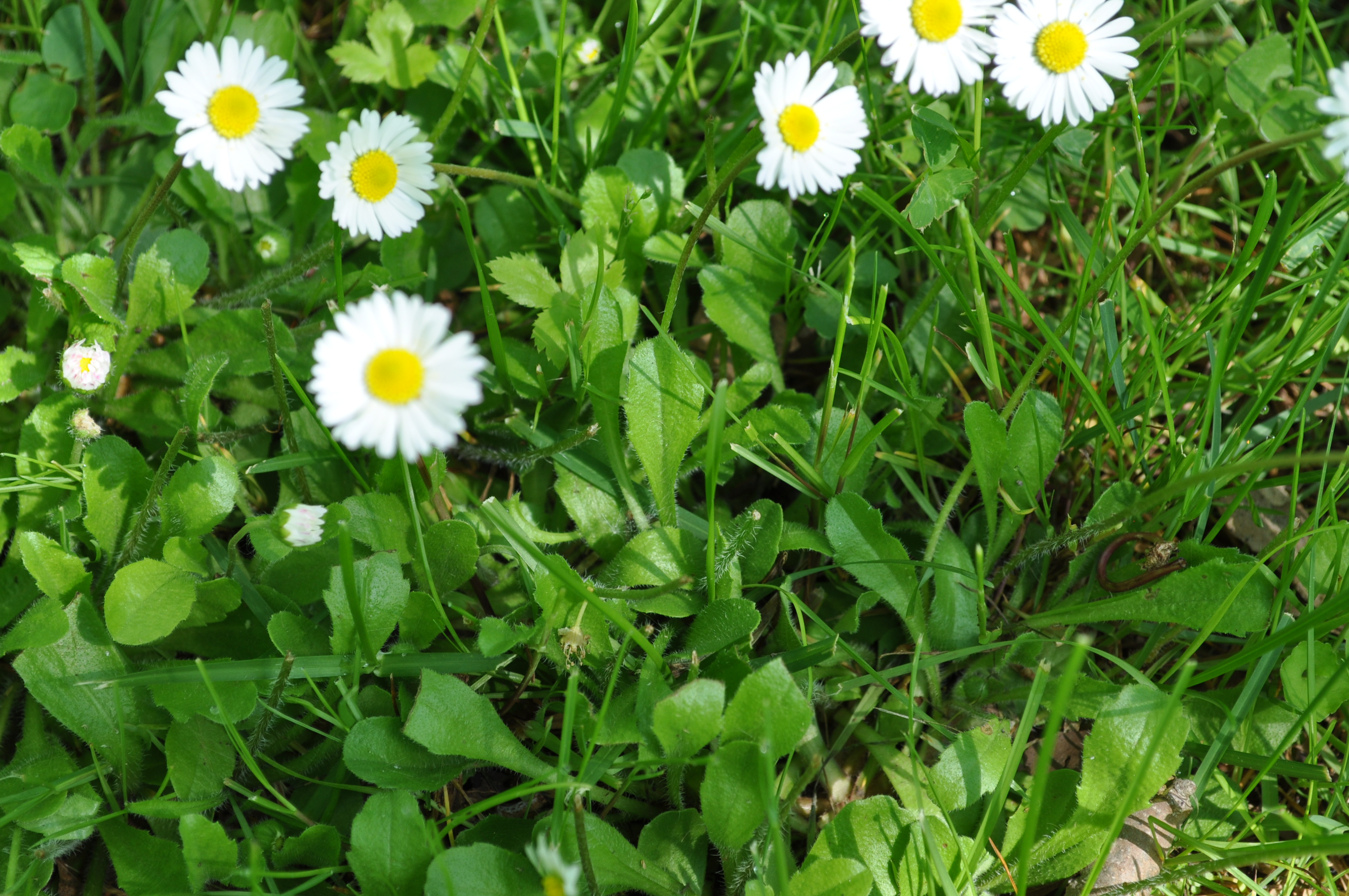
Leaves suddenly broaden to their ends

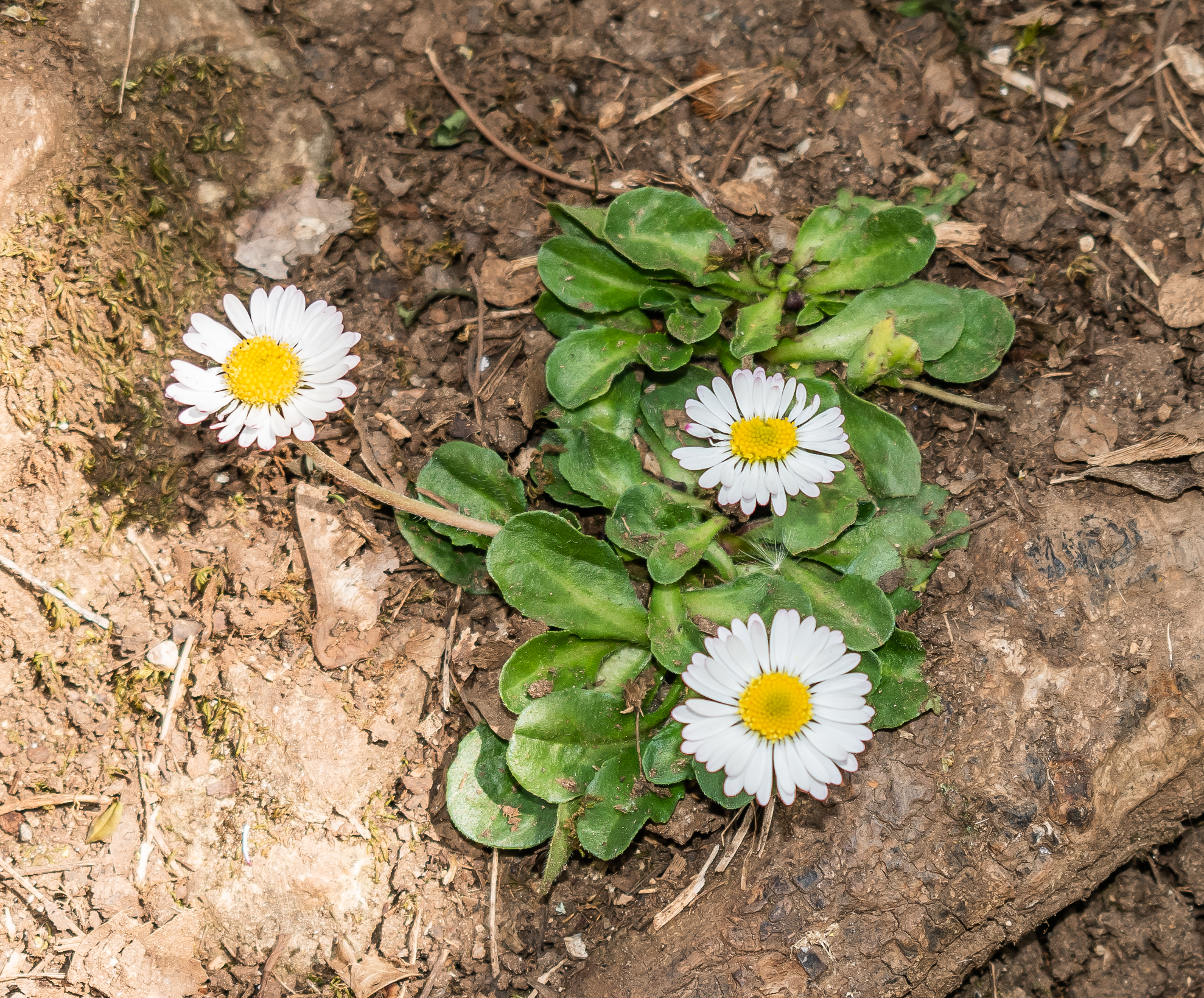
Leaves frequently prostrate

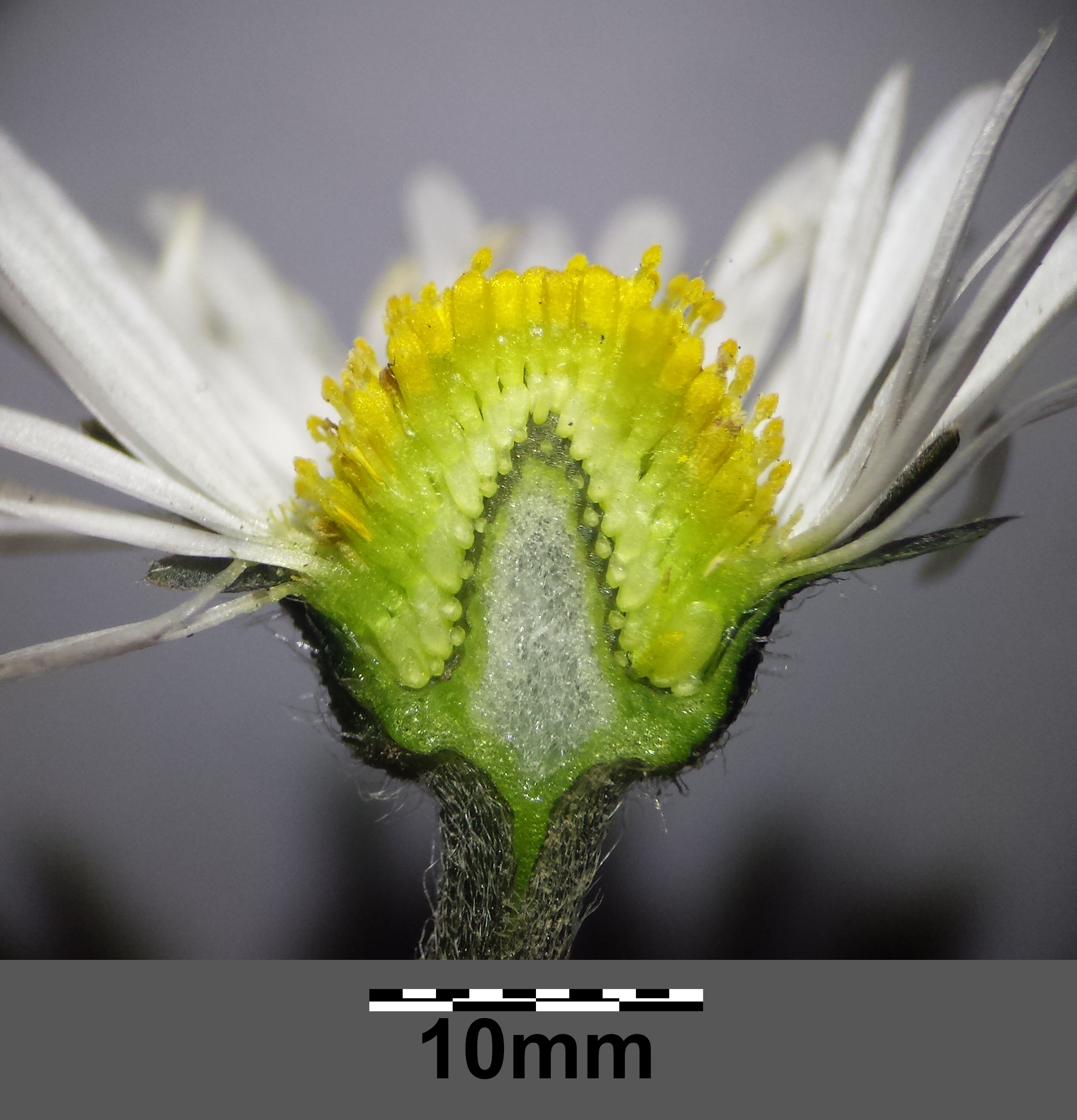
Flower head maturing to a cone

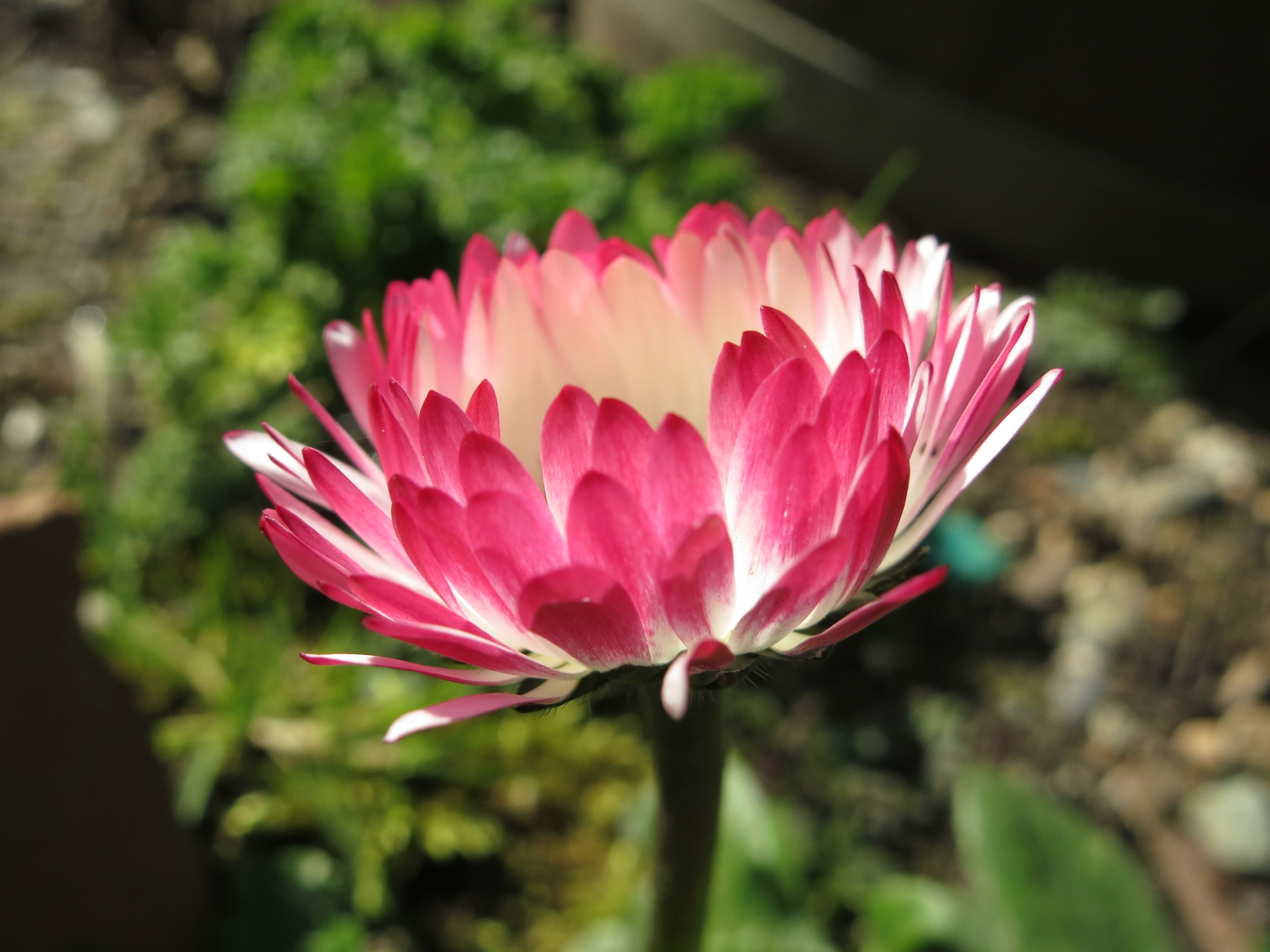
Immature flowers often particularly reddened

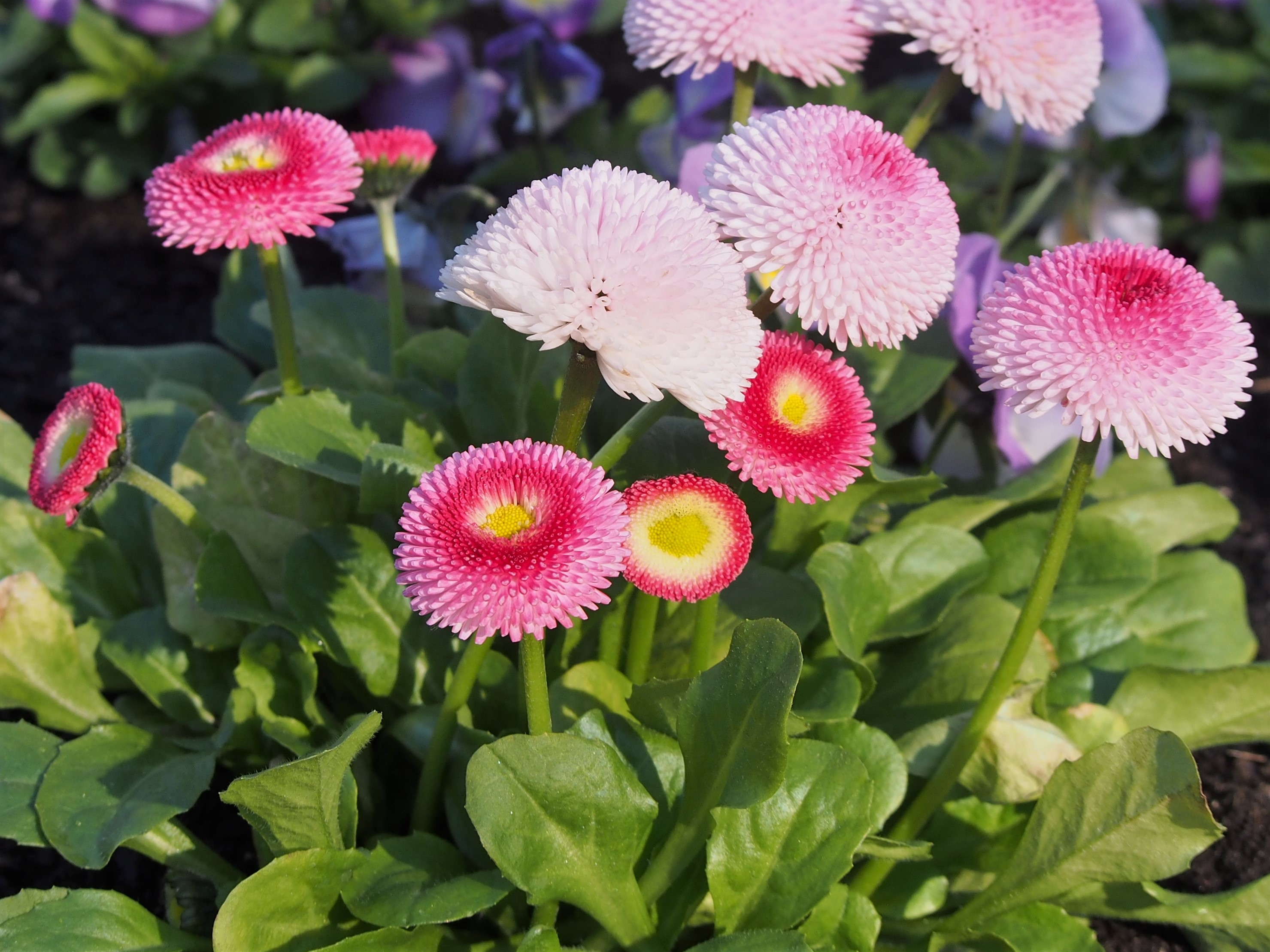
A cluster of daisies of the cultivar 'Tasso Red'

Emerging from concrete steps
