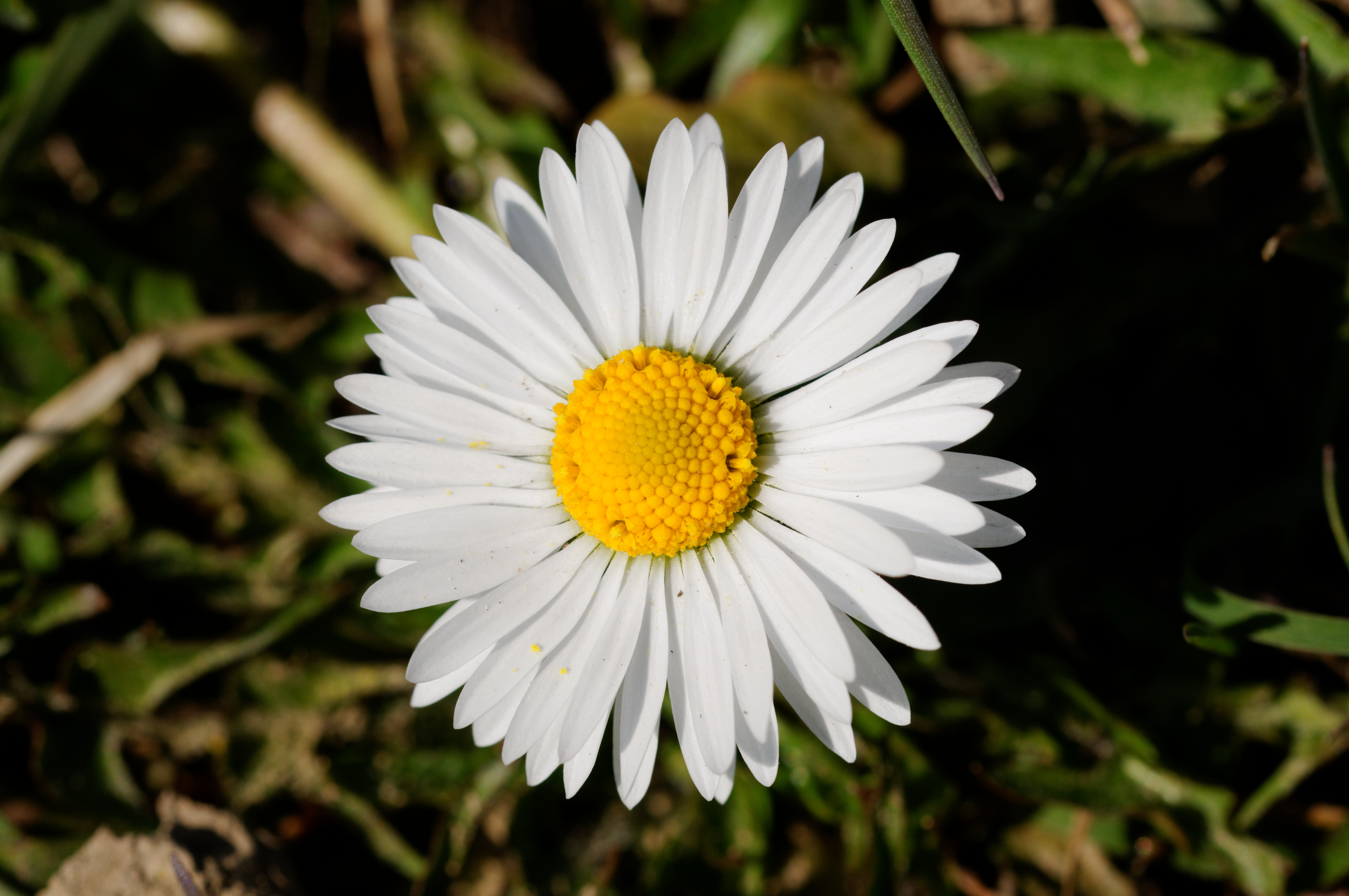
- Daisy (Bellis perennis)

Scientific classification
- Kingdom: Plantae
- Clade: Tracheophytes
- Clade: Angiosperms
- Clade: Eudicots
- Clade: Asterids
- Order: Asterales
- Family: Asteraceae
- Subfamily: Asteroideae
- Tribe: Astereae
- Subtribe: Bellidinae
- Genus: Bellis; L.

Type species
- Bellis perennis L.

Synonyms
- Belliopsis Pomel; Paquerina Cass.; Bellis sect. Paquerina (Cass.) Kuntze; Bellidium Bertol.

= Bellis =

Genus of flowering plants

Bellis (/ˈbɛləs/) is a genus of flowering plants in the family Asteraceae.

The group is native to Europe, the Mediterranean and northern Africa. One species has been introduced into North America and others into other parts of the world. The genus includes the familiar common daisy Bellis perennis.

== Description ==
Bellis species are mostly perennials, and grow from 5–20 cm (2–8 in) tall. They have simple erect stems, and most species have basal leaves. They have radiate flower heads that are produced one per stem.

== Species ==
Accepted species

- Bellis annua L.
  - Bellis annua subsp. minuta
- Bellis atlantica Boiss. & Reut.
- Bellis azorica L.
- Bellis bernardii Boiss. & Reut.
- Bellis caerulescens (Coss.) Coss. ex Ball
- Bellis cordifolia (Kunze) Willk.
- Bellis dubia Spreng.
- Bellis hyrcanica Woronow
- Bellis longifolia Boiss. & Heldr. (synonym of Bellis sylvestris)
- Bellis margaritifolia Huter, Porta & Rigo
- Bellis microcephala Lange
- Bellis pappulosa Boiss. ex DC.
- Bellis perennis L.
- Bellis prostrata Pomel
- Bellis pusilla (N.Terracc.) Pignatti
- Bellis rotundifolia (Desf.) Boiss. & Reut.
- Bellis sylvestris (L.) Cyr.
  - Bellis sylvestris subsp. pappulosa

=== Possible infrageneric groups ===
- Bellis sect. Brachyscome (Cass.) Baill.
- Bellis sect. Brachystephium (Less.) Kuntze
- Bellis sect. Lagenophora (Cass.) Baill.
- Bellis sect. Silphiosperma (Steetz) Kuntze
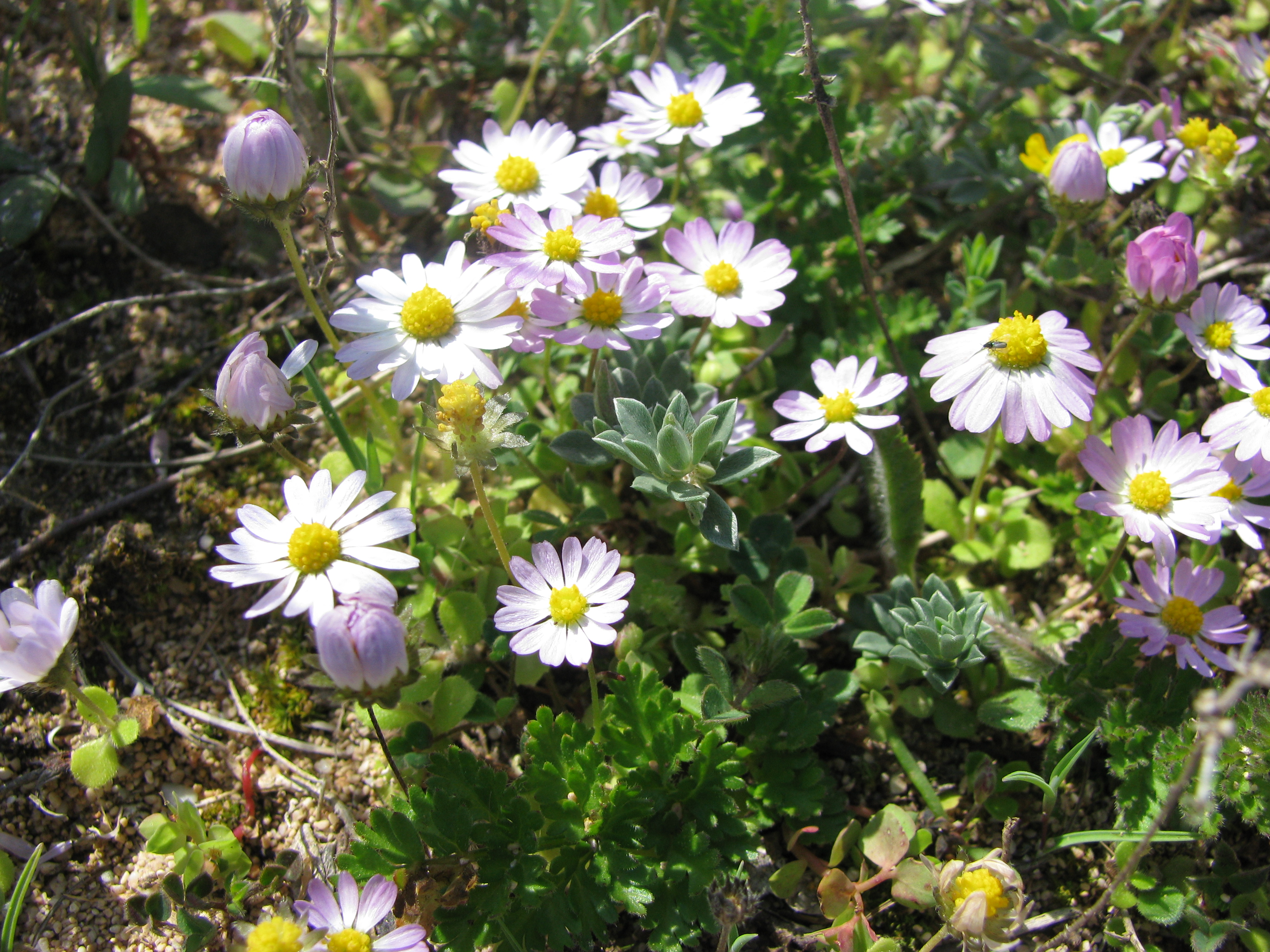
Annual daisy (Bellis annua)

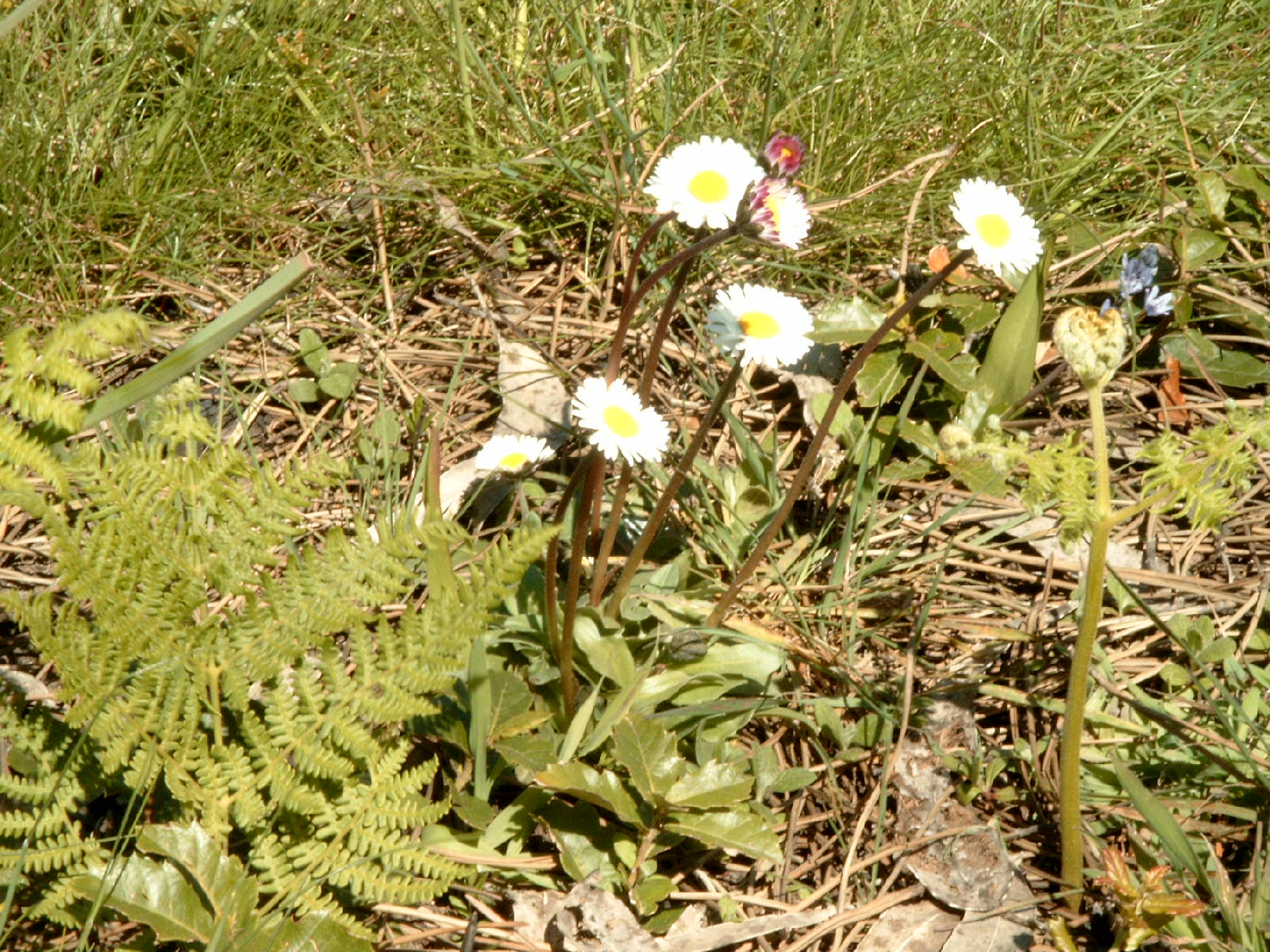
Southern daisy (Bellis sylvestris)

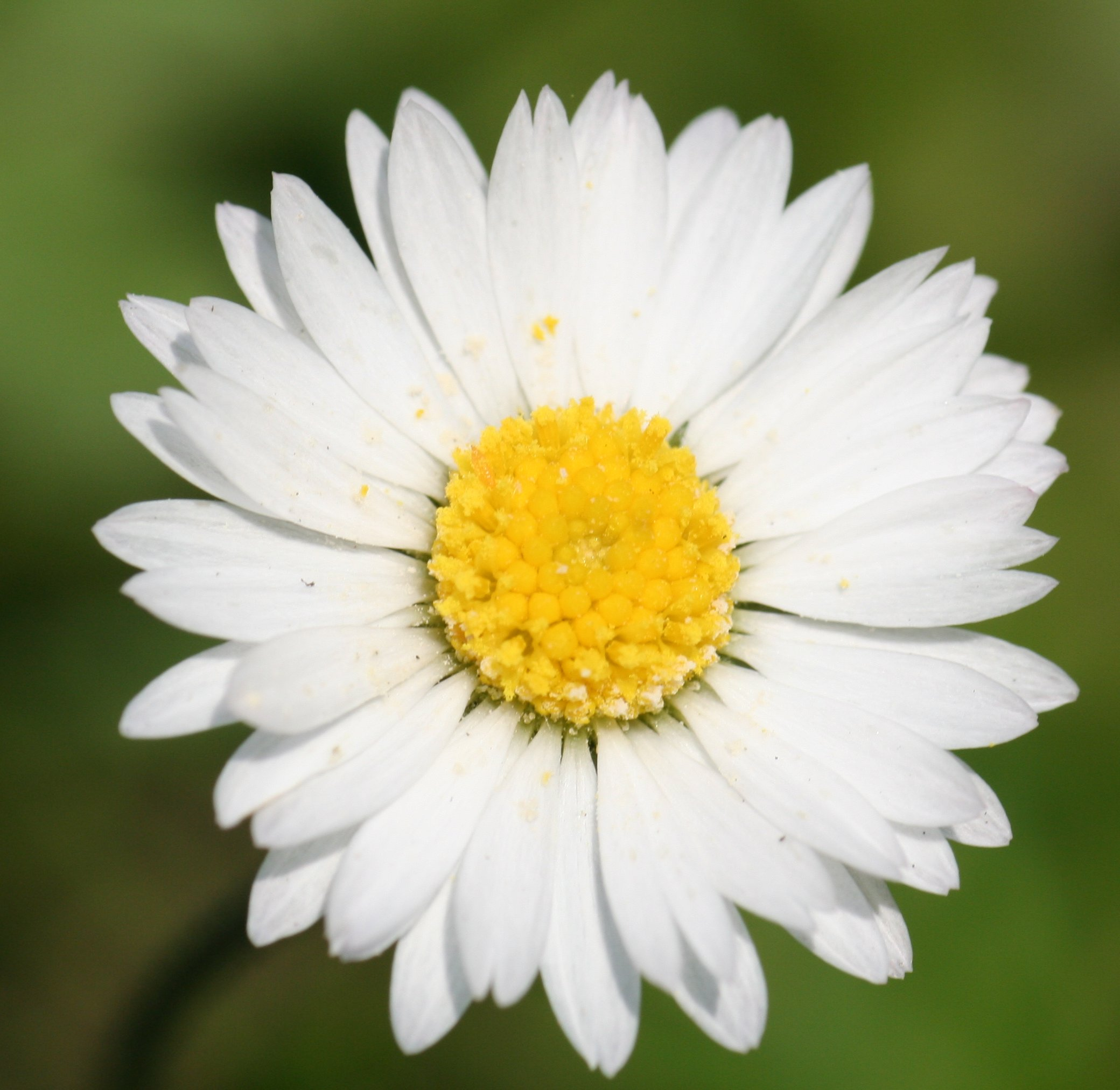
English daisy (Bellis perennis)
