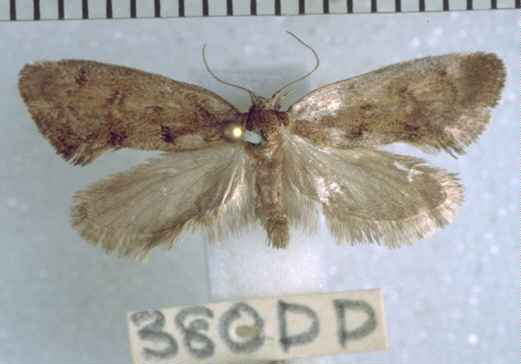
- Male lectotype

Scientific classification
- Kingdom: Animalia
- Phylum: Arthropoda
- Class: Insecta
- Order: Lepidoptera
- Family: Oecophoridae
- Genus: Tingena
- Species: T. ombrodella

Binomial name
- Tingena ombrodella (Hudson, 1950)

Synonyms
- Borkhausenia innotella ombrodella Meyrick, 1950; Borkhausenia ombrodella (Meyrick, 1950)

= Tingena ombrodella =

Species of moth, endemic to New Zealand

Tingena ombrodella is a species of moth in the family Oecophoridae. It is endemic to New Zealand and has been observed in the North and South Islands. Adults of this species are on the wing from November to January and the larvae of the species are litter feeders. This species has been found to inhabit native beech forest.

== Taxonomy ==
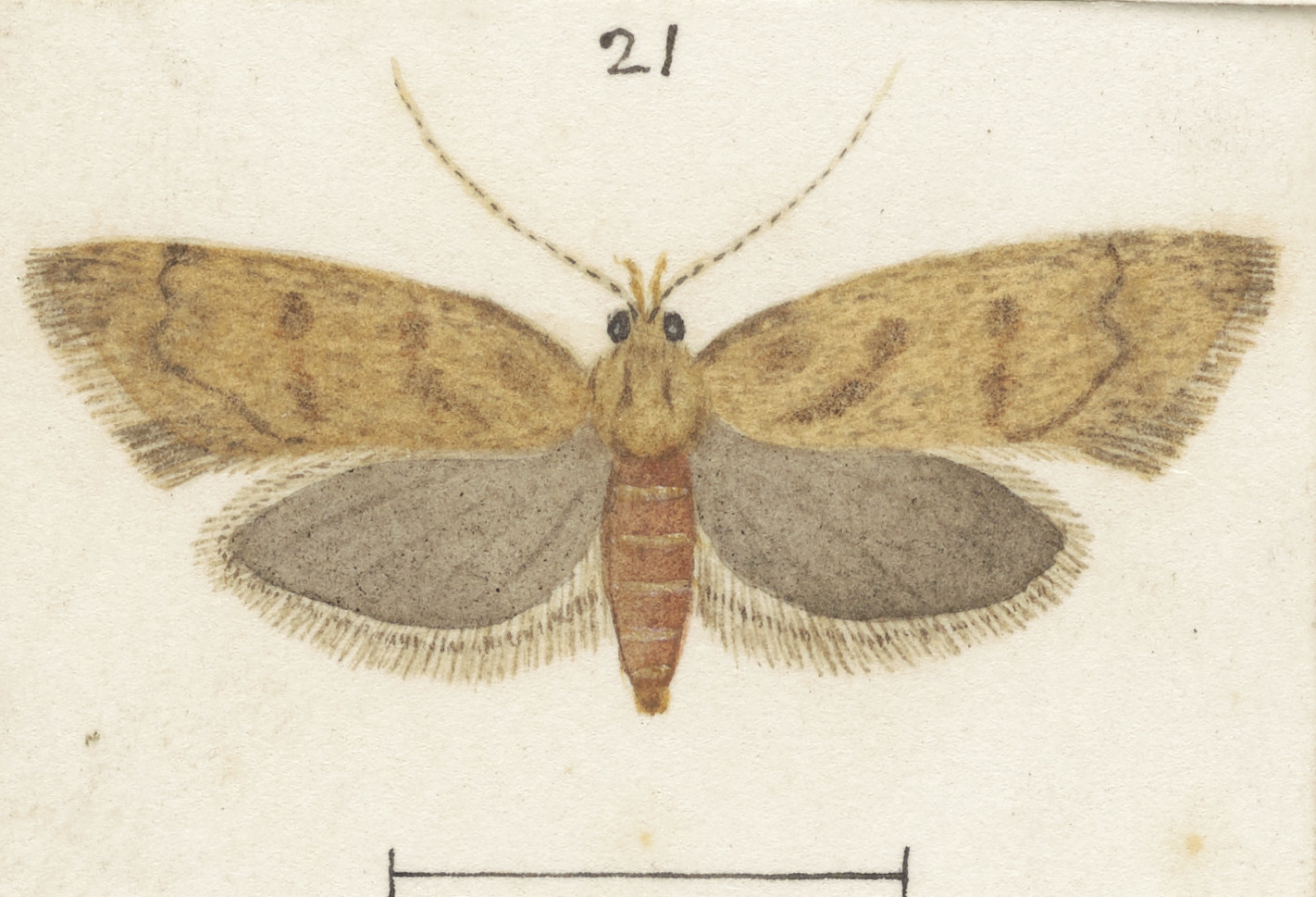
Image illustrated by George Hudson in 1928, said by Dugdale to represent T. ombrodella.

This species was first described and illustrated by George Hudson in 1950 as a variety of Borkhausenia innotella. In 1926 Alfred Philpott discussed and illustrated the genitalia of the male of this species under the nameBorkhausenia innotella. In 1928 George Hudson discussed and illustrated this species also under this name in his book The butterflies and moths of New Zealand. In 1988 J. S. Dugdale placed this species within the genus Tingena. The male lectotype, collected at Whakapapa, Mount Ruapehu, is held at Te Papa.

== Description ==
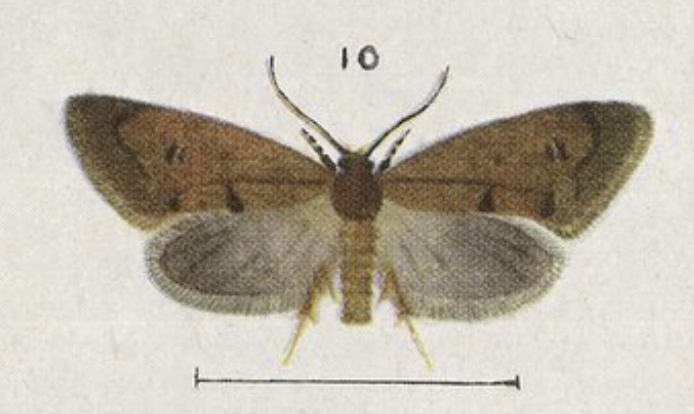
Borkhausenia innotella ombrodella as illustrated by George Hudson in 1950.

Hudson described this species as follows:

a large, dark, local form of this variable insect which has been taken in some numbers at Waimarino and Whakapapa on the Central Plateau of the North Island.

The larvae of this species was illustrated in a 1996 publication by J. S. Dugdale.

== Distribution ==
This species is endemic to New Zealand and has been observed in the North Island including the species type locality of Whakapapa at Mount Ruapehu, in Redvale, Albany, in the Ōrongorongo Valley in Wellington, and at Coronet Peak.

== Behaviour ==
This species is on the wing in November to January and the larvae are litter feeders.

== Habitat ==
This species has been found to inhabit native beech forests.
