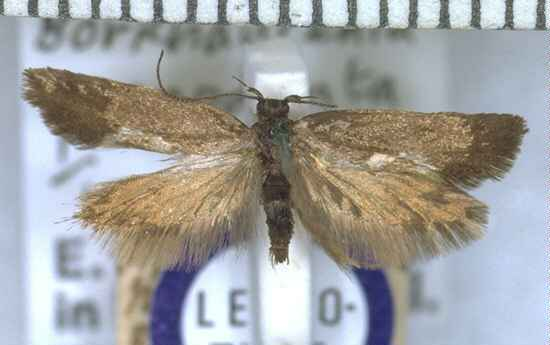
- Male lectotype

Scientific classification
- Kingdom: Animalia
- Phylum: Arthropoda
- Class: Insecta
- Order: Lepidoptera
- Family: Oecophoridae
- Genus: Tingena
- Species: T. monodonta

Binomial name
- Tingena monodonta (Meyrick, 1911)

Synonyms
- Cremnogenes monodonta Meyrick, 1911; Borkhausenia monodonta (Meyrick, 1911); Cremnogenes nigra Philpott, 1914

= Tingena monodonta =

Species of moth, endemic to New Zealand

Tingena monodonta is a species of moth in the family Oecophoridae. It is endemic to New Zealand and has been found in both the North and South Islands. This species inhabits native beech forest at altitudes of between 2500 – 3000 ft. The adults of the species are on the wing from November and December.

== Taxonomy ==
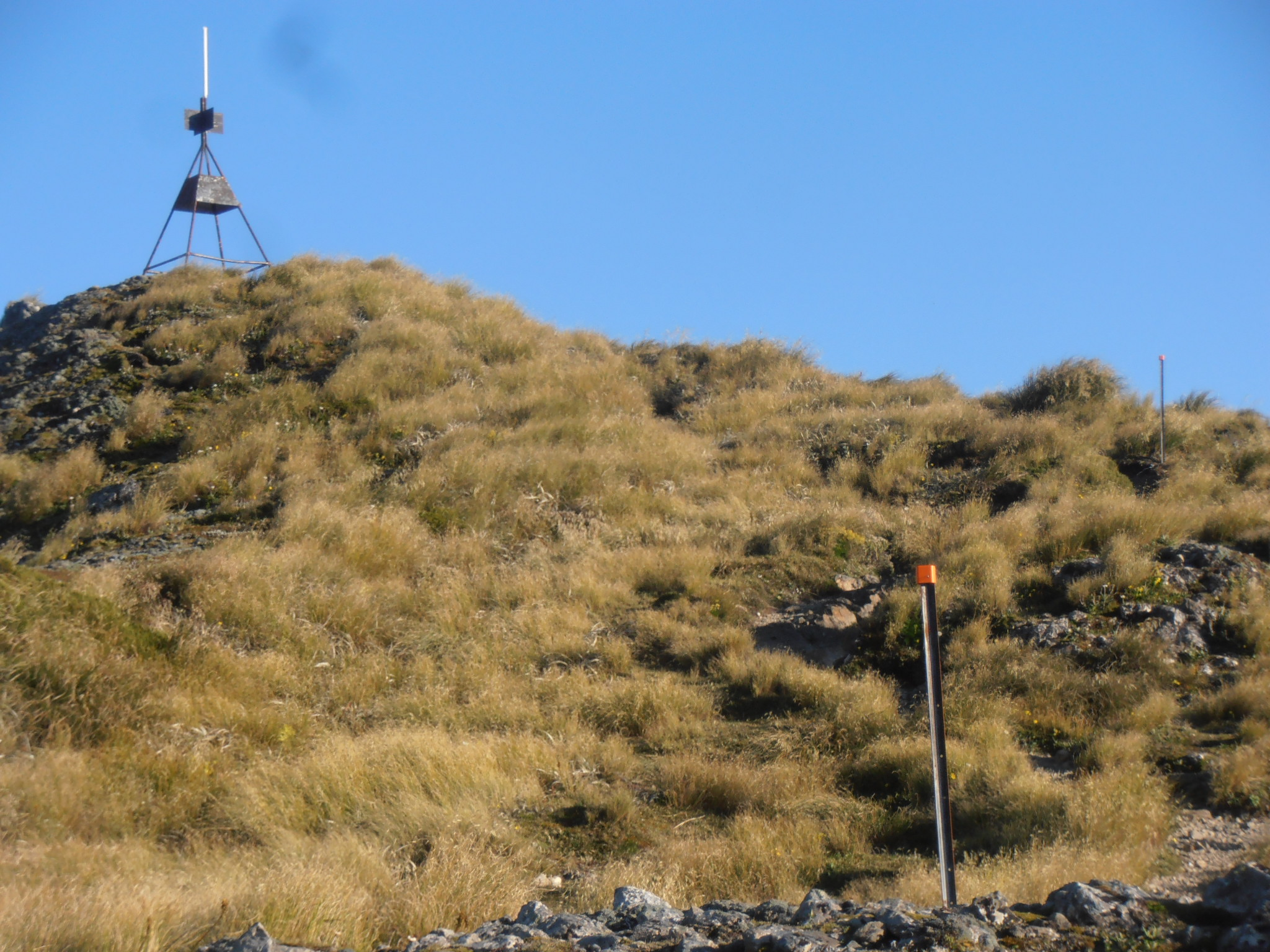
Mount Holdsworth, type locality of T. monodonta.

This species was first described by Edward Meyrick in 1911 using specimens collected by R. M. Sunley at Mount Holdsworth at altitudes of between 3000 – 4000 ft in November. In 1915 Meyrick placed this species within the Borkhausenia genus. In that same publication Meyrick synonymised Cremnogenes nigra with Borkhausenia monodonta. In 1926 Alfred Philpott discussed and illustrated the genitalia of the male of this species. In 1928 George Hudson also discussed and illustrated this species in his book The butterflies and moths of New Zealand. In 1988 J. S. Dugdale placed this species within the genus Tingena. The male lectotype is held at the Natural History Museum, London.

== Description ==
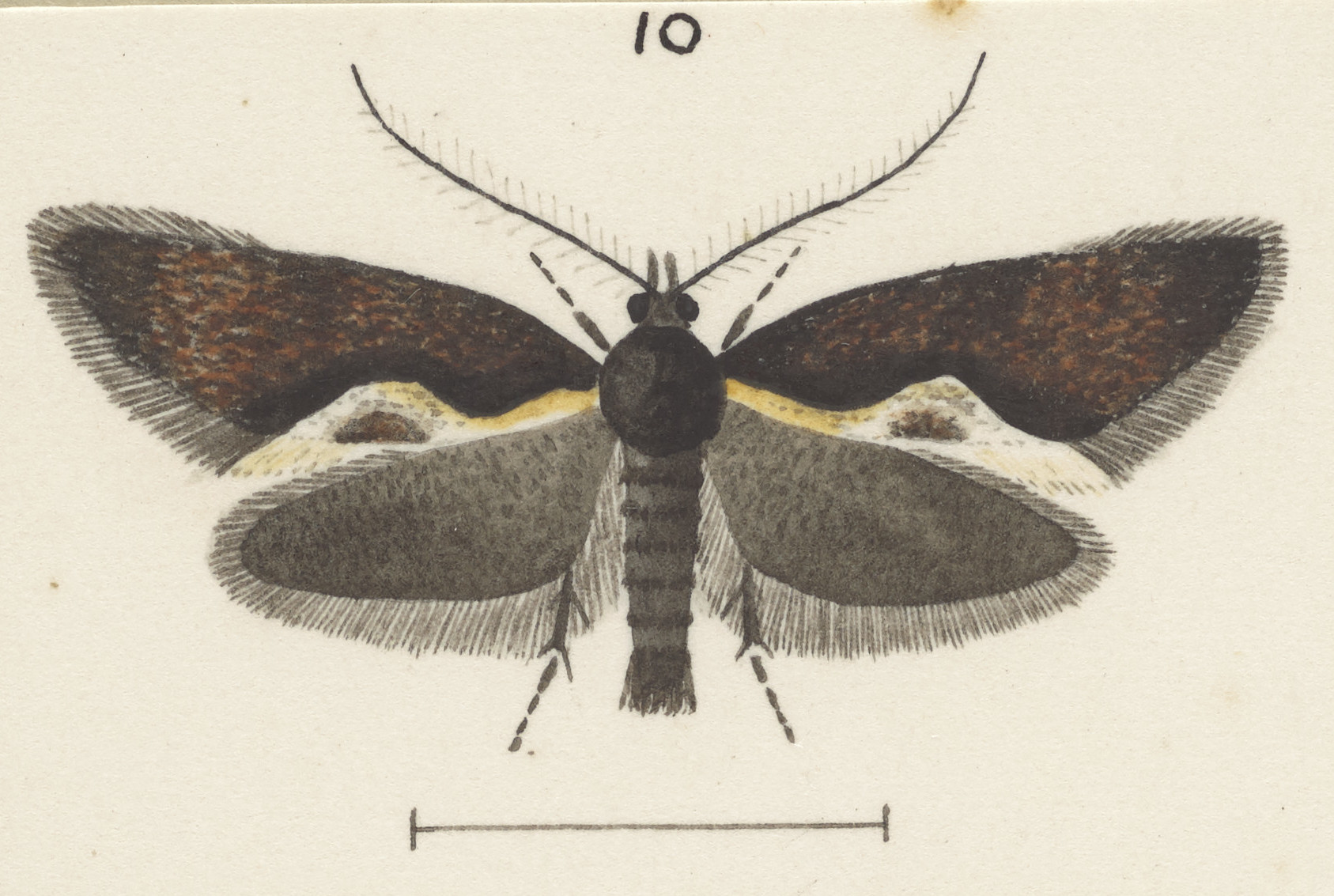
Illustration of T. monodonta by George Hudson.

Meyrick described this species as follows:

♂♀. 17 mm. Head, palpi, antennae, thorax, and abdomen dark fuscous; antennal ciliations 4, whorled. Forewings elongate, costa gently arched, apex obtuse, termen very obliquely rounded; dark bronzy-purplish-fuscous; a small whitish-ochreous elongate mark on fold before middle of wing, and a few ochreous-whitish scales towards dorsum before tornus, in one specimen these markings confluent so as to form an obscure semioval dorsal patch : cilia bronzy-fuscous, mixed with darker towards base, beneath tornus with an ochreous-whitish spot. Hindwiiigs dark bronzy-fuscous; cilia bronzy-fuscous, with darker subbasal shade.

== Distribution ==
This species is endemic to New Zealand. This species has been observed in the Wellington region, Mount Arthur, Arthur's Pass and in the mountains in Otago.

== Behaviour ==
The adults of this species are on the wing in November and December.

== Habitat ==
T. monodonta inhabits native beech forest at altitudes from 2500 – 3000 ft.
