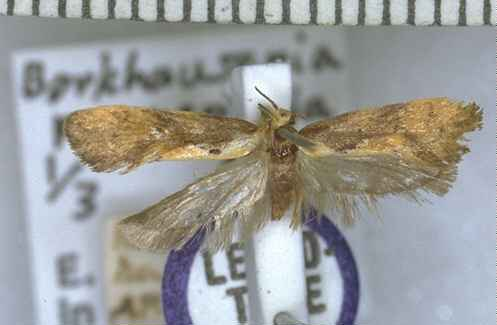
- Male lectotype

Scientific classification
- Kingdom: Animalia
- Phylum: Arthropoda
- Class: Insecta
- Order: Lepidoptera
- Family: Oecophoridae
- Genus: Tingena
- Species: T. pronephela

Binomial name
- Tingena pronephela (Meyrick, 1907)

Synonyms
- Borkhausenia pronephela Meyrick, 1907

= Tingena pronephela =

Species of moth, endemic to New Zealand

Tingena pronephela is a species of moth in the family Oecophoridae. It is endemic to New Zealand and is found in the southern parts of the South Island. The species inhabits the outskirts of scrub and native forest. The adults of this species are on the wing from October to February.

== Taxonomy ==
This species was first described by Edward Meyrick in 1907 using specimens collected by Alfred Philpott in Invercargill in December and named Borkhausenia pronephela. In 1915 Meyrick discussed this species under that name. In 1926 Philpott discussed and illustrated the genitalia of the male of this species. In 1928 George Hudson discussed and illustrated this species in his book The butterflies and moths of New Zealand. In 1988 J. S. Dugdale placed this species within the genus Tingena. The male lectotype is held at the Natural History Museum, London.

== Description ==
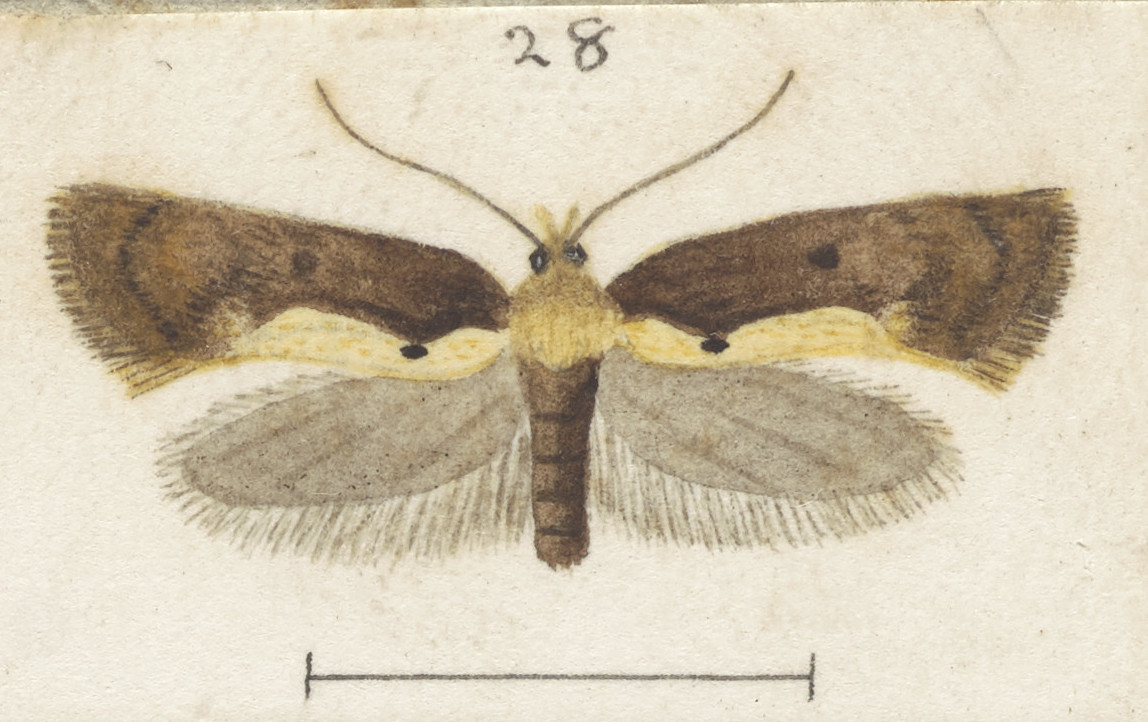
T. pronephela as illustrated by George Hudson.

Meyrick originally described this species as follows:

♂. 16-17 mm. Head and thorax ochreous-yellowish. Palpi light yellowish, lower half of second joint dark fuscous. Antennae dark fuscous. Abdomen grey. Forewings elongate, rather narrow, costa moderately arched, apex obtuse, termen. rounded, rather strongly oblique; yellow-ochreous; a pale yellow dorsal streak from base to near tornus; basal third of wing suffused with brown or dark fuscous except on dorsal streak which is indented by the dark colouring before middle, indentation partially whitish-edged and containing a blackish mark; two ill-defined fasciae of fuscous suffusion from middle of dorsal streak and tornus respectively, meeting on middle of costa; stigmata cloudy, dark fuscous, plical beneath first discal; some dark fuscous scales indicating an angulated subterminal line : cilia yellow-ochreous mixed with fuscous, with a fuscous postmedian shade. Hindwings grey; cilia whitish-grey.

== Distribution ==
This species is endemic to New Zealand and has been observed in the southern parts of the South Island including its type locality of Invercargill, at Bluecliff and in Dunedin.

== Behaviour ==
The adults of this species are on the wing from October to February.

== Habitat ==
This species inhabits the outskirts of scrub and native forest.
