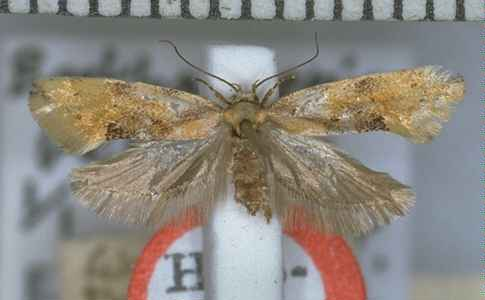
- Female holotype

Scientific classification
- Kingdom: Animalia
- Phylum: Arthropoda
- Class: Insecta
- Order: Lepidoptera
- Family: Oecophoridae
- Genus: Tingena
- Species: T. berenice

Binomial name
- Tingena berenice (Meyrick, 1929)

Synonyms
- Borkhausenia berenice Meyrick, 1929

= Tingena berenice =

Species of moth, endemic to New Zealand

Tingena berenice is a species of moth in the family Oecophoridae. It is endemic to New Zealand and has been found in the North and South Islands. It is a brightly coloured species which is on the wing in November. Its preferred habitat is mixed beech forest.

== Taxonomy ==
This species was described by Edward Meyrick in 1929 using specimens collected by George Hudson in November in Wellington and named Borkhausenia berenice. In 1988 J. S. Dugdale placed this species in the genus Tingena. The female holotype specimen is held at the Natural History Museum, London.

== Description ==
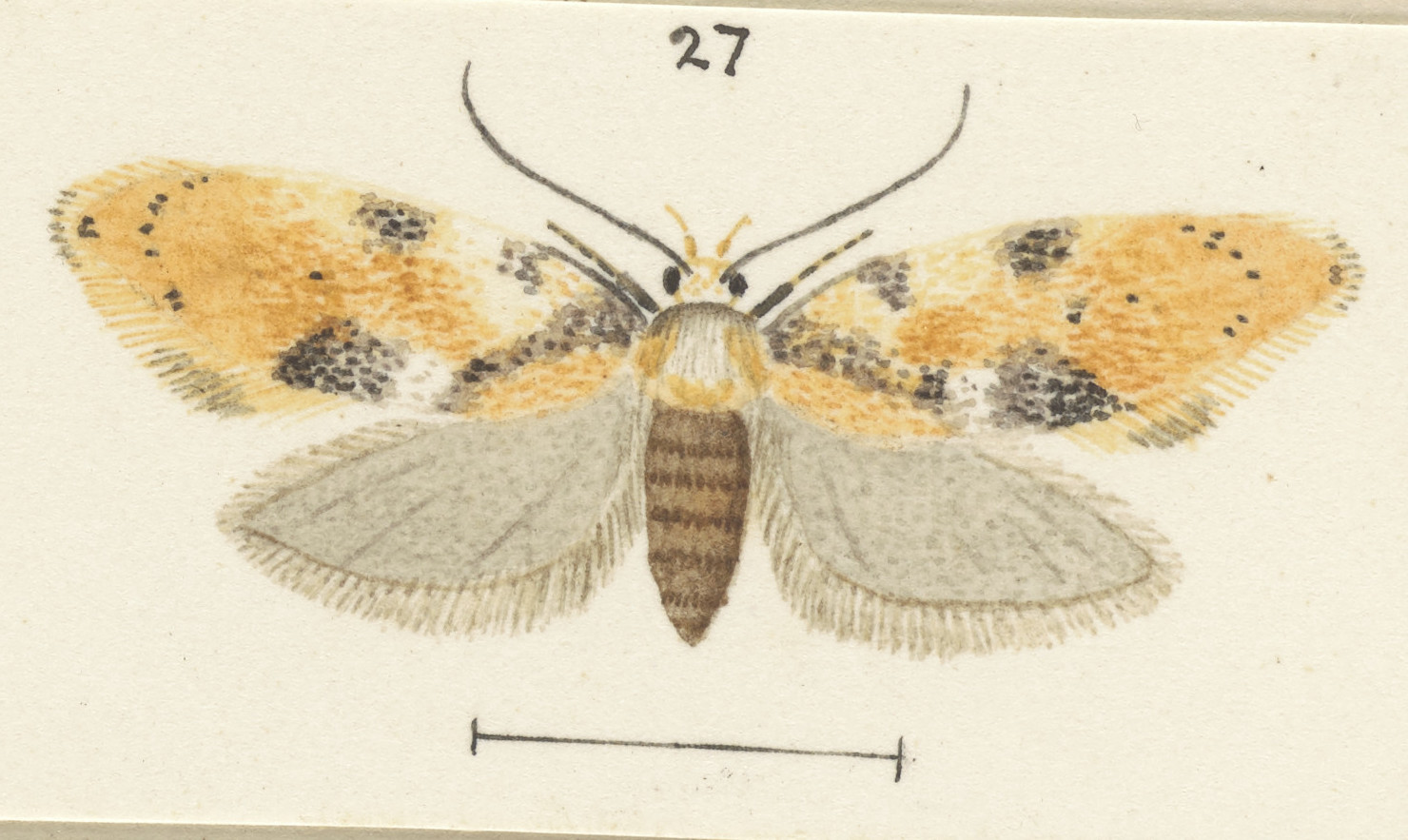
Illustration of T. berenice by George Hudson.

Meyrick described the adults of this species as follows:

♂. 15 mm. Head whitish. Palpi whitish, second joint irrorated dark grey except apex. Thorax grey-whitish, posteriorly tinged pale fulvous on margins. Forewings elongate, costa gently arched, apex obtuse, termen rounded, rather strongly oblique; ochreous-whitish, becoming pale ochreous-yellowish posteriorly and towards dorsum anteriorly; a very oblique fascia of grey suffusion from base of costa to middle of dorsum; costal spots of grey irroration at 1/3 and 3/5; a subtriangular blackish blotch on dorsum about 3/4, surrounded by broad light fulvous irroration or suffusion extending to tornus and 3/4 across wing: cilia whitish-ochreous. Hindwings grey; cilia pale grey.

This species is brightly coloured.

== Distribution ==
This species is endemic to New Zealand. It was first collected by Hudson in Gollans Valley and has also been found near the Homer Tunnel.

== Behaviour ==
Adults of this species are on the wing in November.

== Habitat ==
This species preferred habitat is mixed beech forest.
