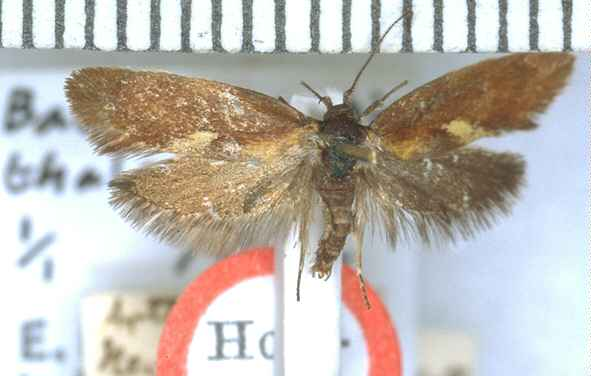
- Male holotype

Scientific classification
- Kingdom: Animalia
- Phylum: Arthropoda
- Class: Insecta
- Order: Lepidoptera
- Family: Oecophoridae
- Genus: Tingena
- Species: T. thalerodes

Binomial name
- Tingena thalerodes (Meyrick, 1916)

Synonyms
- Borkhausenia thalerodes Meyrick, 1916

= Tingena thalerodes =

Species of moth, endemic to New Zealand

Tingena thalerodes is a species of moth in the family Oecophoridae. It is endemic to New Zealand and has been found at Arthur's Pass. This species inhabits rough herbage on mountain sides. Adults are on the wing in December and January.

== Taxonomy ==
This species was first described by Edward Meyrick in 1916 using a specimen collected at Arthur's Pass in December by George Hudson and named Borkhausenia thalerodes. George Hudson discussed and illustrated this species under the name Borkhausenia thalerodes in his 1928 publication The butterflies and moths of New Zealand. Philpott discussed this species under the name B. thalerodes however he was unable to find a specimen for dissection in order to study the male genitalia. In 1988 J. S. Dugdale placed this species within the genus Tingena. The male holotype, collected at Arthur's Pass, is held in at the Natural History Museum, London.

== Description ==
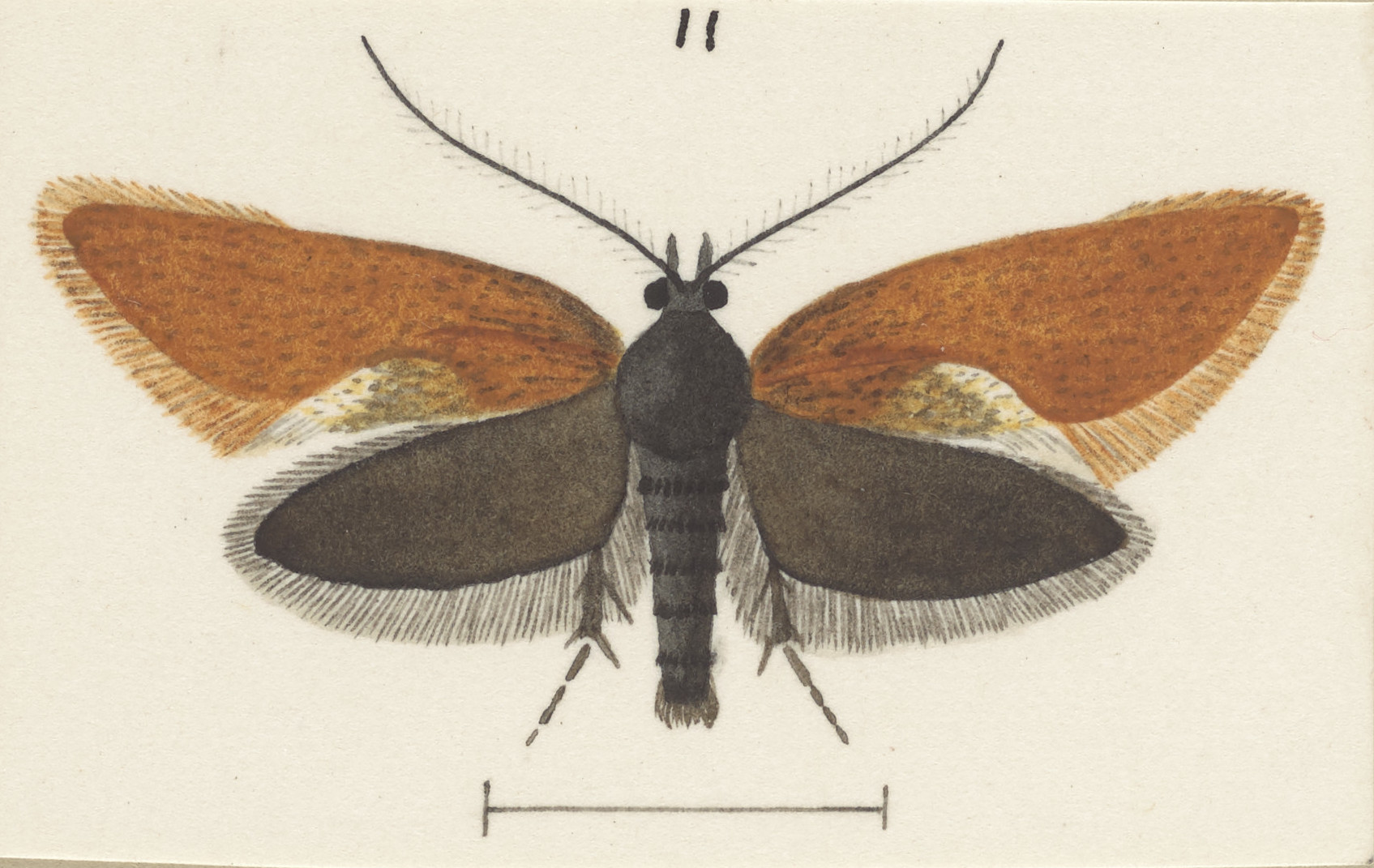
Illustration of T. thalerodes by George Hudson.

Meyrick described this species as follows:

♂. 17 mm. Head, thorax, and abdomen blackish, apex of patagia pale ferruginous-yellowish. Antennal ciliations 2 1/2. Forewings elongate, costa gently arched, apex obtuse-pointed, termen faintly sinuate, rather strongly oblique; deep ferruginous, somewhat mixed with grey; a suffused light-yellowish streak along basal third of dorsum; a whitish-yellowish inwardly oblique transverse spot from dorsum beyond middle, reaching 2/5 across wing : cilia ferruginous, with two grey shades. Hindwings blackish-grey : cilia dark grey, with blackish-grey subbasal shade.

== Distribution ==
This species is endemic to New Zealand.

== Behaviour ==
The adults of this species are on the wing in December and January.

== Habitat ==
T. thalerodes inhabits rough herbage on mountain sides.
