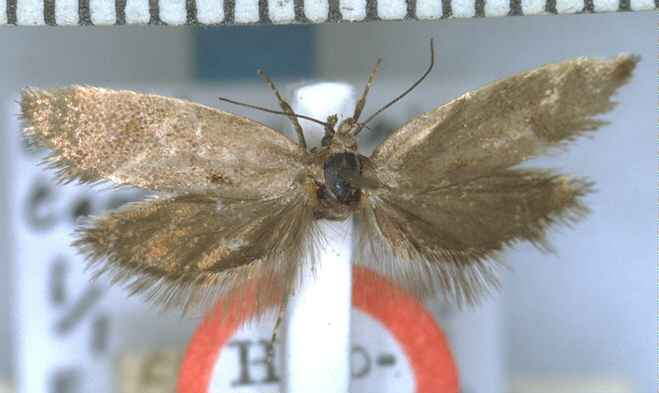
- Female holotype

Scientific classification
- Kingdom: Animalia
- Phylum: Arthropoda
- Class: Insecta
- Order: Lepidoptera
- Family: Oecophoridae
- Genus: Tingena
- Species: T. tephrophanes

Binomial name
- Tingena tephrophanes (Meyrick, 1929)

Synonyms
- Borkhausenia tephrophanes Meyrick, 1929

= Tingena tephrophanes =

Species of moth, endemic to New Zealand

Tingena tephrophanes is a species of moth in the family Oecophoridae. It is endemic to New Zealand and has been found at Mount Arthur. Adults of this species are on the wing in January.

== Taxonomy ==
This species was described by Edward Meyrick in 1929 using specimens collected by George Hudson in January in Flora Creek at Mount Arthur and named Borkhausenia tephrophanes. In 1939 George Hudson discussed and illustrated this species under this same name. In 1988 J. S. Dugdale placed this species in the genus Tingena. The female holotype specimen is held at the Natural History Museum, London.

== Description ==
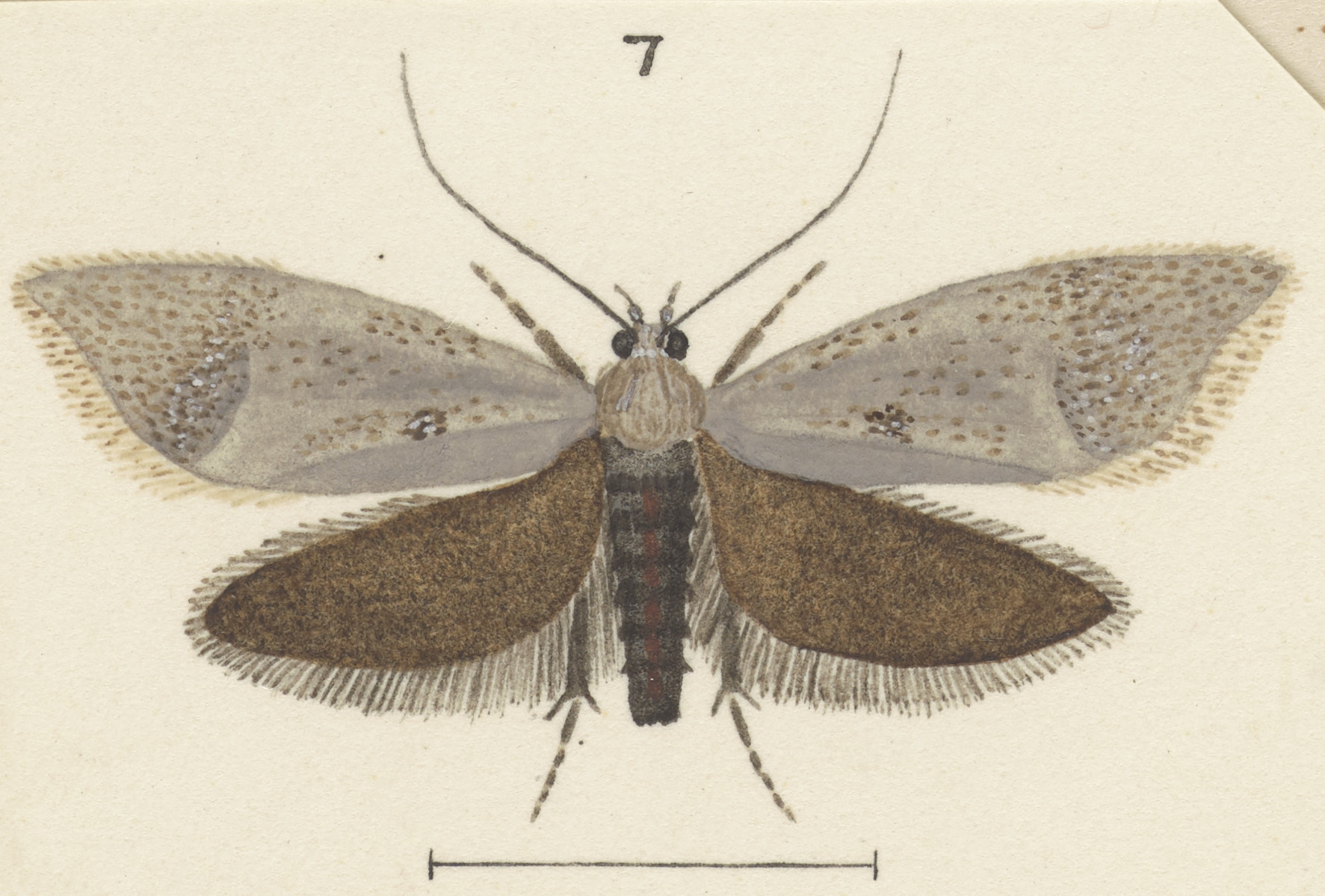
Illustration of T. tephrophanes by George Hudson.

Meyrick first described this species as follows:

♀. 19 mm. Head, thorax grey. Palpi dark grey, slightly speckled white. Forewings rather elongate, costa gently arched, apex pointed, termen very obliquely rounded; glossy bluish-grey; extreme costal edge dark grey on basal ¼, then finely whitish to near apex; plical stigma rather elongate, blackish; a fine indistinct whitish inwards-oblique line from dorsum before tornus reaching half across wing, beyond this some obscure fuscous irroration crossing wing obliquely: cilia grey-whitish irrorated fuscous. Hindwings dark fuscous; cilia grey, darker within a faint slender whitish subbasal line.

Similar in appearance to Tingena nycteris but can be distinguished as T. tephrophranes is a shiny leaden grey colour and has a tornal suffusion.

== Distribution ==
This species is endemic to New Zealand and has been found at Mount Arthur.

== Behaviour ==
The adult of this species is on the wing in January.

== Habitat ==
This species inhabits subalpine native forests.
