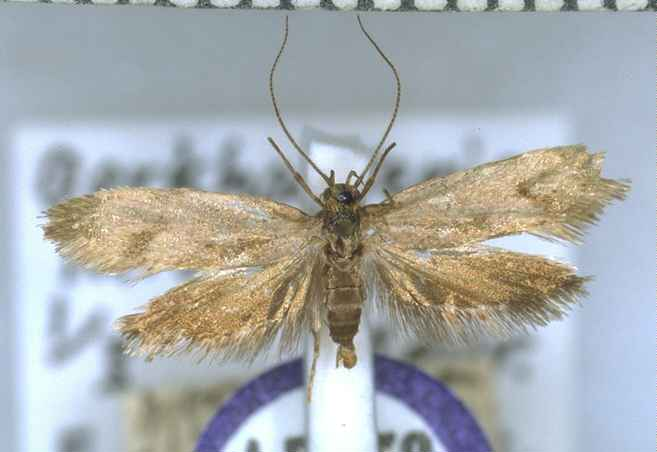
- Male lectotype

Scientific classification
- Kingdom: Animalia
- Phylum: Arthropoda
- Clade: Pancrustacea
- Class: Insecta
- Order: Lepidoptera
- Family: Oecophoridae
- Genus: Tingena
- Species: T. idiogama

Binomial name
- Tingena idiogama (Meyrick, 1924)

Synonyms
- Borkhausenia idiogama Meyrick, 1924

= Tingena idiogama =

Species of moth, endemic to New Zealand

Tingena idiogama is a species of moth in the family Oecophoridae. It is endemic to New Zealand and has been observed on the slopes of Mount Taranaki. Its preferred habitat is native subalpine scrub and adults are on the wing in January.

== Taxonomy ==
The species was first described by Edward Meyrick in 1924 using specimens collected at Mount Taranaki in January and named Borkhausenia idiogama. George Hudson discussed and illustrated this species in his 1928 book The butterflies and moths of New Zealand also under the same name. In 1988 J. S. Dugdale placed this species in the genus Tingena. The male lectotype specimen, collected at Mount Taranaki is held at the Natural History Museum, London.

== Description ==
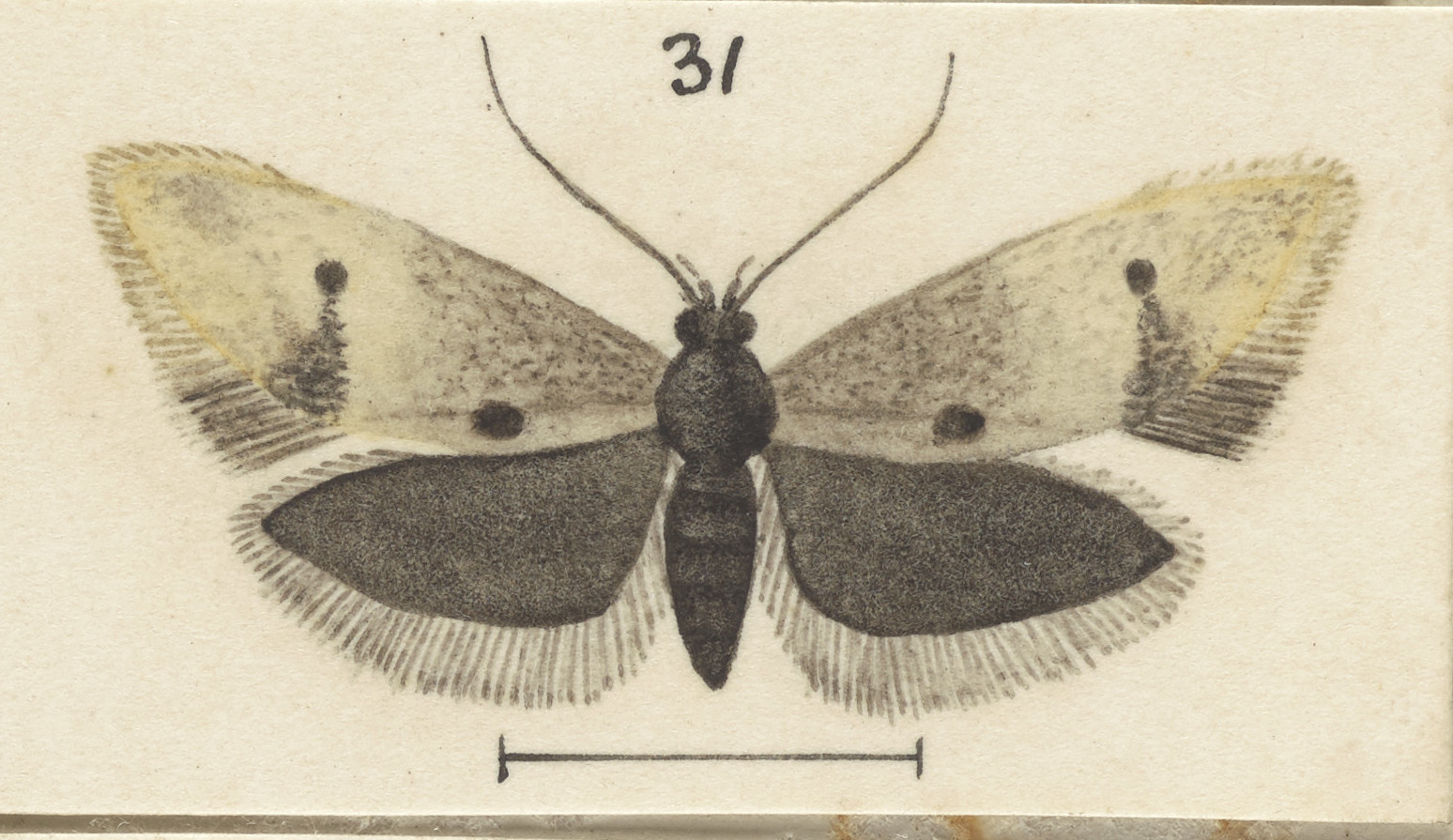
Illustration of T. idiogama by George Hudson.

Meyrick described this species as follows:

♂♀. 15–16 mm. Head and thorax bronzy-grey, orbits in ♂ paleyellowish. Palpi grey, in ♂ suffused pale-yellowish towards base, apex of second joint whitish. Antennal cilation of ♂ 1. Abdomen dark grey, in ♂ anal tuft and exserted genitalia whitish-ochreous, in ♀ a short whitishochreous scale-tuft beneath from praeanal segment, ovipositor exserted, filiform. Forewings light grey, irregularly and suffusedly irrorated ochreous-whitish or light yellow-ochreous, especially posteriorly, a few scattered dark-grey scales; plical stigma blackish-grey, beneath it in ♀ an oblique spot of whitish suffusion; an inwardly-oblique streak of dark-fuscous suffusion from tornus, its apex indicating second discal stigma: cilia pale grey, suffusedly mixed or mostly suffused pale ochreous-yellowish. Hindwings dark grey; cilia grey.

Hudson stated that this species is variable in appearance in particular its discal markings on the forewings.

== Distribution ==
This species is endemic to New Zealand and has been found on the lower slopes of Mount Taranaki.

== Behaviour ==
The adults of this species are on the wing in January.

== Habitat ==
This species prefers subalpine scrub habitat.
