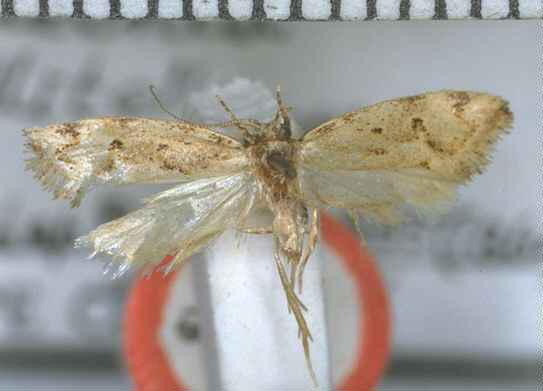
- Male holotype

Scientific classification
- Kingdom: Animalia
- Phylum: Arthropoda
- Class: Insecta
- Order: Lepidoptera
- Family: Oecophoridae
- Genus: Tingena
- Species: T. collitella

Binomial name
- Tingena collitella (Walker, 1864)

Synonyms
- Gelechia collitella Walker, 1864; Borkhausenia collitella (Walker, 1864)

= Tingena collitella =

Species of moth, endemic to New Zealand

Tingena collitella is a species of moth in the family Oecophoridae. It is endemic to New Zealand and has been observed in Auckland.

== Taxonomy ==
It was described by Francis Walker in 1864 and named Gelechia collitella. In 1884 Edward Meyrick stated he thought this species might be a form of what is now known as T. griseata. In 1926 Alfred Philpott discussed the species under the name Borkhausenia collitella. In 1988 John S. Dugdale assigned this species to the genus Tingena. The holotype specimen, collected in Auckland, is held at the Natural History Museum, London.

== Description ==
Walker described this species as follows:

Male. Pale cinereous. Head, thorax and fore wings slightly tinged with fawn-colour. Palpi smooth, much longer than the breadth of the head; third joint setiform, much shorter than the second. Antennae extremely minutely setulose and moniliform, much shorter than the fore wings. Legs rather stout. Wings rather broad; fringe moderately long. Fore wings slightly rounded at the tips, speckled with fawn-colour, with some brown marks; a few of these before the middle; a larger one in the exterior disk and a still larger one on the costa near the tip; fringe partly tinged with brown; exterior border very oblique. Length of the body 3 lines; of the wings 8 lines.

== Distribution ==
This species is endemic to New Zealand and has been observed in Auckland.
