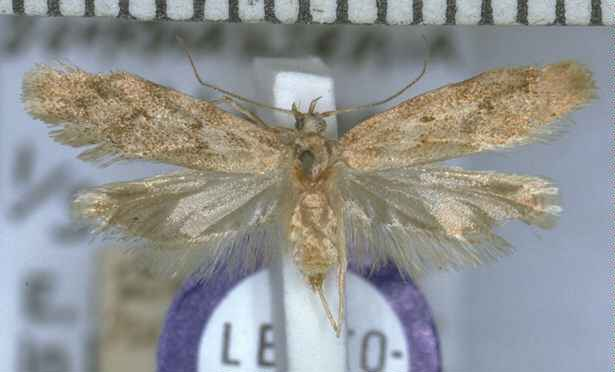
- Male lectotype

Scientific classification
- Kingdom: Animalia
- Phylum: Arthropoda
- Class: Insecta
- Order: Lepidoptera
- Family: Oecophoridae
- Genus: Tingena
- Species: T. letharga

Binomial name
- Tingena letharga (Meyrick, 1883)

Synonyms
- Oecophora letharga Meyrick, 1883; Borkhausenia letharga (Meyrick, 1883)

= Tingena letharga =

Species of moth, endemic to New Zealand

Tingena letharga is a species of moth in the family Oecophoridae. It is endemic to New Zealand and has been observed in Otago. Adults are on the wing in December and January.

== Taxonomy ==
This species was first described by Edward Meyrick in 1883 using specimens collected in Dunedin in January. Meyrick originally named the species Oecophora horaea. Meyrick went on to give a fuller description of the species in 1884. In 1915 Meyrick placed this species within the Borkhausenia genus. In 1926 Alfred Philpott was unable to study the genitalia of the male of this species as it was not represented in collections in New Zealand. George Hudson discussed this species under the name Borkhausenia letharga in his 1928 publication The butterflies and moths of New Zealand. In 1988 J. S. Dugdale placed this species in the genus Tingena. The male lectotype specimen is held at the Natural History Museum, London.

== Description ==
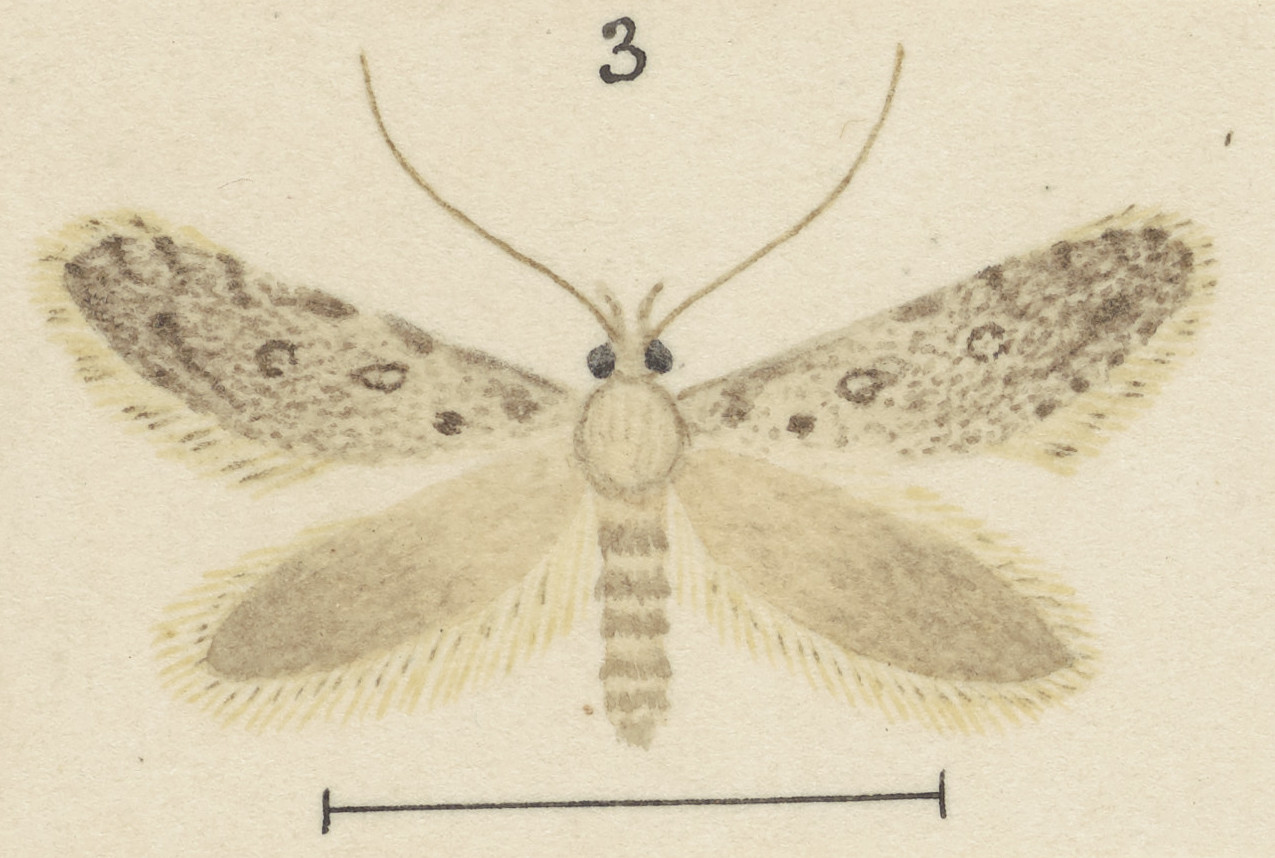
Illustration of T. letharga by George Hudson.

Meyrick first described this species as follows:

Fore wings whitish-grey, irrorated with fuscous, three anterior costal spots, two discal dots, a third on fold before first, and posterior transverse angulated line dark fuscous; hind wings grey.

Meyrick described this species more fully as follows:

Male. — 16-16 1/2 mm. Head, palpi, antennae, and thorax ochreous-whitish, mixed with fuscous-grey. Abdomen ochreous-whitish. Anterior and middle legs fuscous-grey, central ring of tibiae and apex of all joints ochreous-whitish; posterior legs ochreous-whitish. Forewings moderate, costa moderately arched, apex rounded, hindmargin extremely obliquely rounded; pale whitish-grey, slightly ochreous-tinged, and irrorated with dark fuscous; a cloudy fuscous spot on costa at base, another at 1/4, and a third in middle; a small cloudy dark fuscous spot in disc near base; a dark fuscous dot in disc before middle, a second beyond middle, and a third rather obliquely before first on fold; a cloudy fuscous outwards-bent transverse line from f of costa to anal angle, indented inwards beneath costa : cilia pale whitish-ochreous, sprinkled with dark fuscous. Hindwings light grey, apex darker; cilia grey-whitish, with a distinct grey line near base.

== Distribution ==
This species is endemic to New Zealand and has been observed in Otago including at Dunedin and Ida Valley.

== Behaviour ==
Adults of this species are on the wing in December and January.
