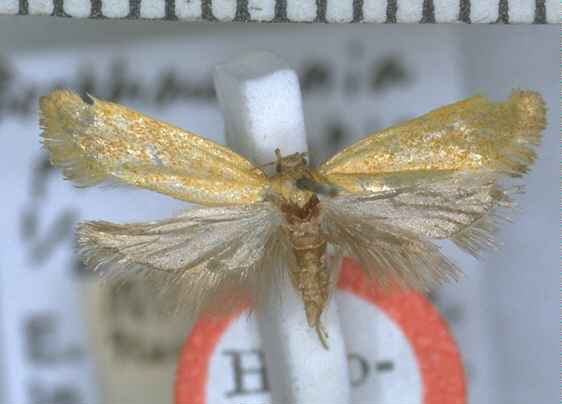
- Female holotype

Scientific classification
- Kingdom: Animalia
- Phylum: Arthropoda
- Class: Insecta
- Order: Lepidoptera
- Family: Oecophoridae
- Genus: Tingena
- Species: T. pharmactis

Binomial name
- Tingena pharmactis (Meyrick, 1905)

Synonyms
- Borkhausenia pharmactis Meyrick, 1905

= Tingena pharmactis =

Species of moth, endemic to New Zealand

Tingena pharmactis is a species of moth in the family Oecophoridae. It is endemic to New Zealand and has been observed in the Nelson, Tasman and Wellington regions. The adults of this species are on the wing in December.

== Taxonomy ==
This species was first described in 1905 by Edward Meyrick using a specimen he collected in January at the Mount Arthur tableland at 4000 ft. Meyrick originally named this species Borkhausenia pharmactis. In 1915 Meyrick discussed this species under the name Borkhausenia pharmactis. In 1926 Alfred Philpott discussed and illustrated the genitalia of the male of this species. In 1928 George Hudson also discussed and illustrated this species in his book The butterflies and moths of New Zealand. In 1988 J. S. Dugdale placed this species within the genus Tingena. The female holotype is held at the Natural History Museum, London.

== Description ==
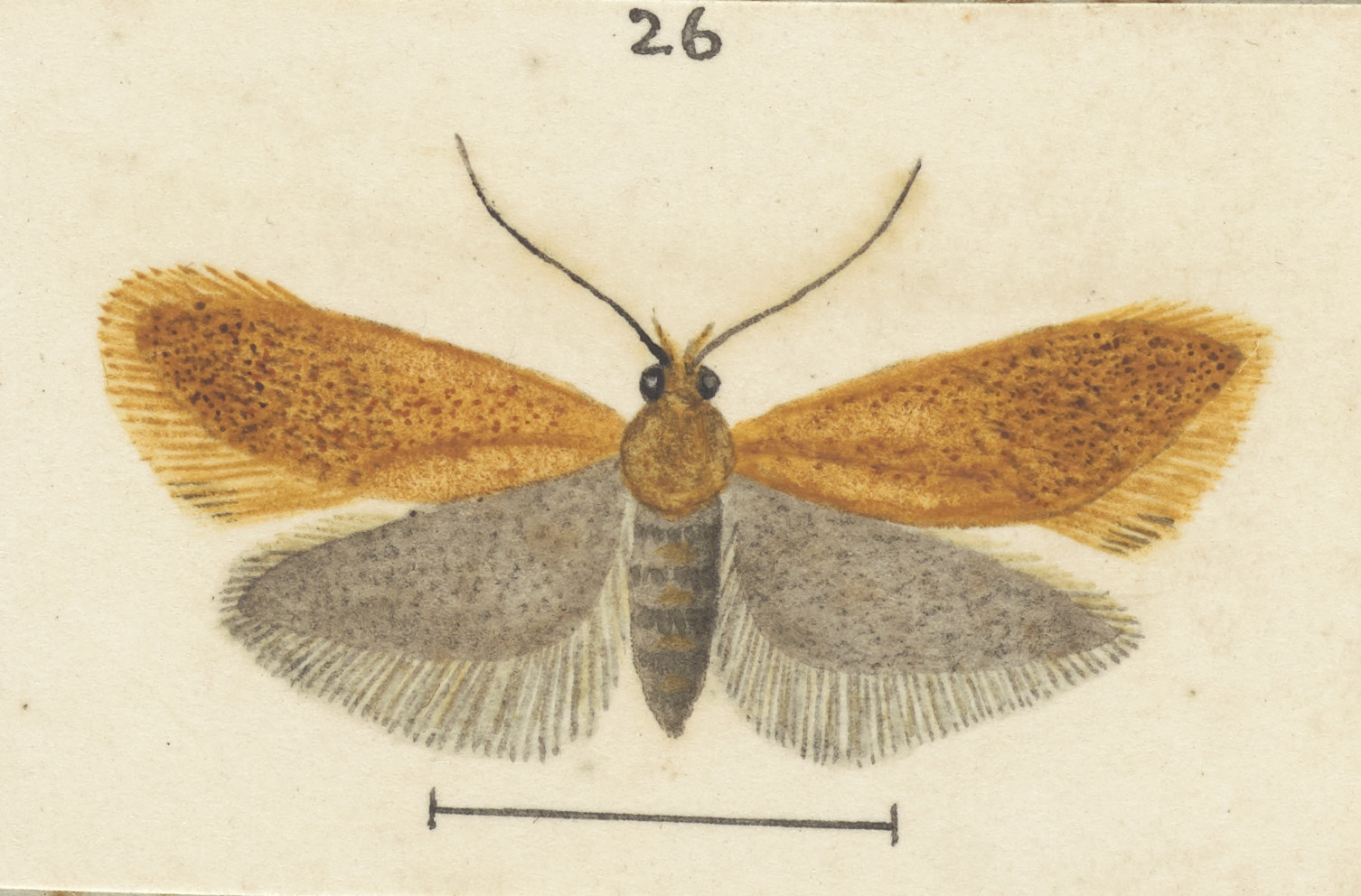
Illustration of T. pharmactis by George Hudson.

Meyrick described the species as follows:

♂ . 15 mm. Head fuscous, sprinkled with pale yellowish hairs. Palpi whitish-yellowish, sprinkled with dark fuscous. Antennae whitish-yellowish, ringed with dark fuscous. Thorax ochreous-yellow, anteriorly suffused with fuscous. Abdomen grey. Fore-wings elongate, costa gently arched, apex obtuse, termen slightly rounded, rather strongly oblique; deep ochreous-yellow, finely sprinkled throughout with brown; extreme costal edge dark fuscous towards base : cilia ochreous-yellow, somewhat sprinkled with brown. Hind-wings dark grey; cilia whitish-grey, with grey basal shade.

== Distribution ==
This species is endemic to New Zealand. It has been observed in the Nelson/Tasman regions at Mount Arthur and at the Cobb Valley as well as in the Wellington region at Kapiti Island.

== Behaviour ==
The adults of this species are on the wing in December.
