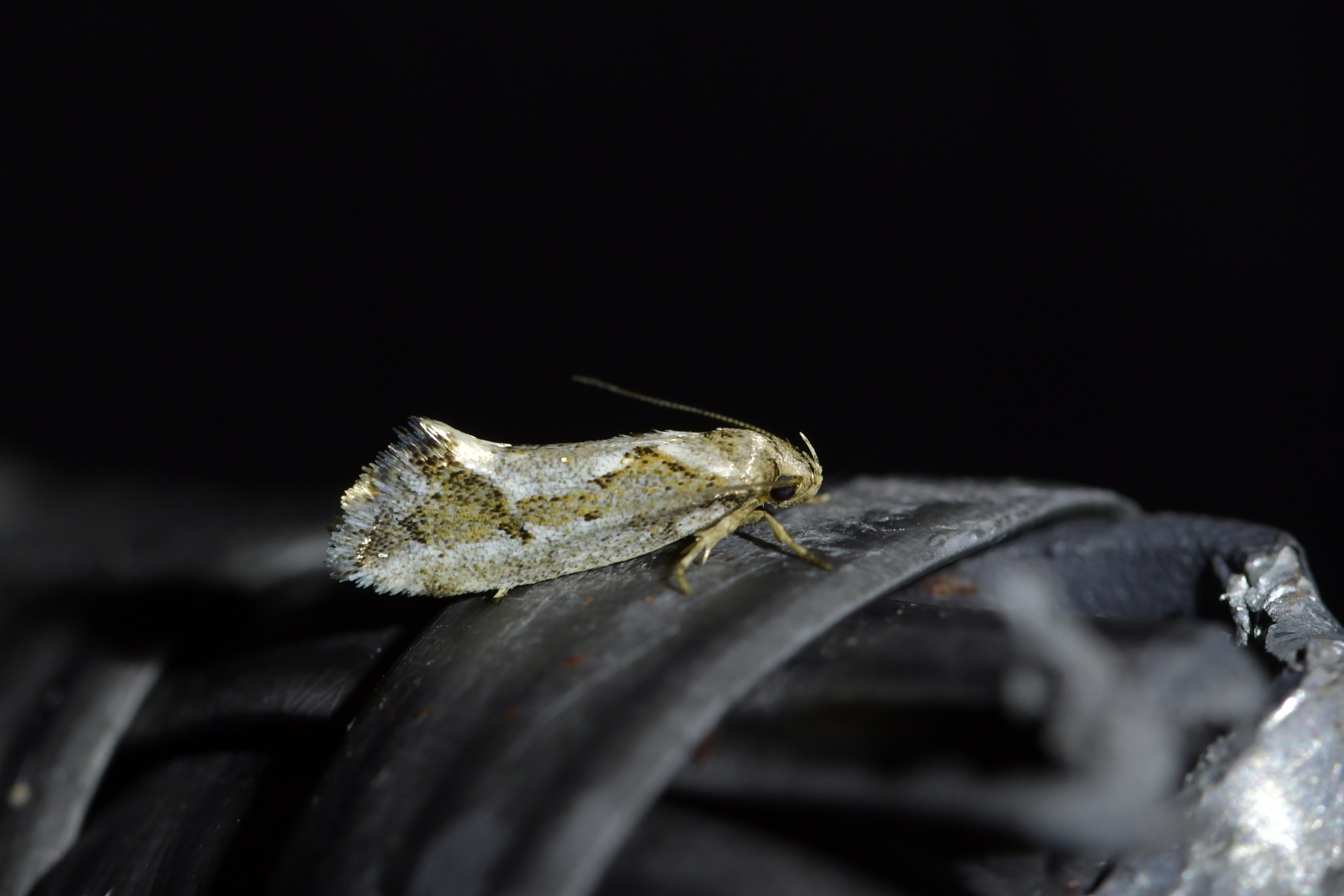

Scientific classification
- Kingdom: Animalia
- Phylum: Arthropoda
- Class: Insecta
- Order: Lepidoptera
- Family: Oecophoridae
- Genus: Tingena
- Species: T. hemimochla

Binomial name
- Tingena hemimochla (Meyrick, 1883)

Synonyms
- Oecophora hemimochla Meyrick, 1883; Borkhausenia hemimochla (Meyrick, 1883)

= Tingena hemimochla =

Species of moth, endemic to New Zealand

Tingena hemimochla is a species of moth in the family Oecophoridae. It is endemic to New Zealand and has been observed in the North Island. Adults of this species are on the wing from December until March.

== Taxonomy ==
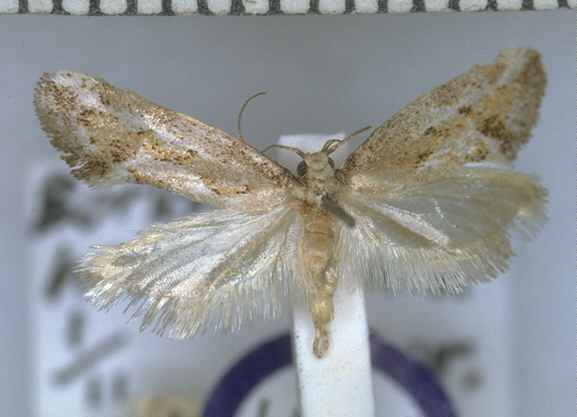
Tingena hemimochla male lectotype

This species was first described by Edward Meyrick in 1883 using specimens collected at Hamilton, Wellington and Napier in January and March. He originally named the species Oecophora hemimochla. Meyrick went on to give a fuller description of the species in 1884. In 1915 Meyrick placed this species within the Borkhausenia genus. In 1926 Alfred Philpott studied the genitalia of the female of this species. George Hudson discussed this species under the name B. hemimochla in his 1928 publication The butterflies and moths of New Zealand. In 1988 J. S. Dugdale placed this species in the genus Tingena. The male lectotype, collected at the Wellington Botanic Garden, is held at the Natural History Museum, London. In 2004 the phylogenetic relationship of this species to similar species was studied.

== Description ==
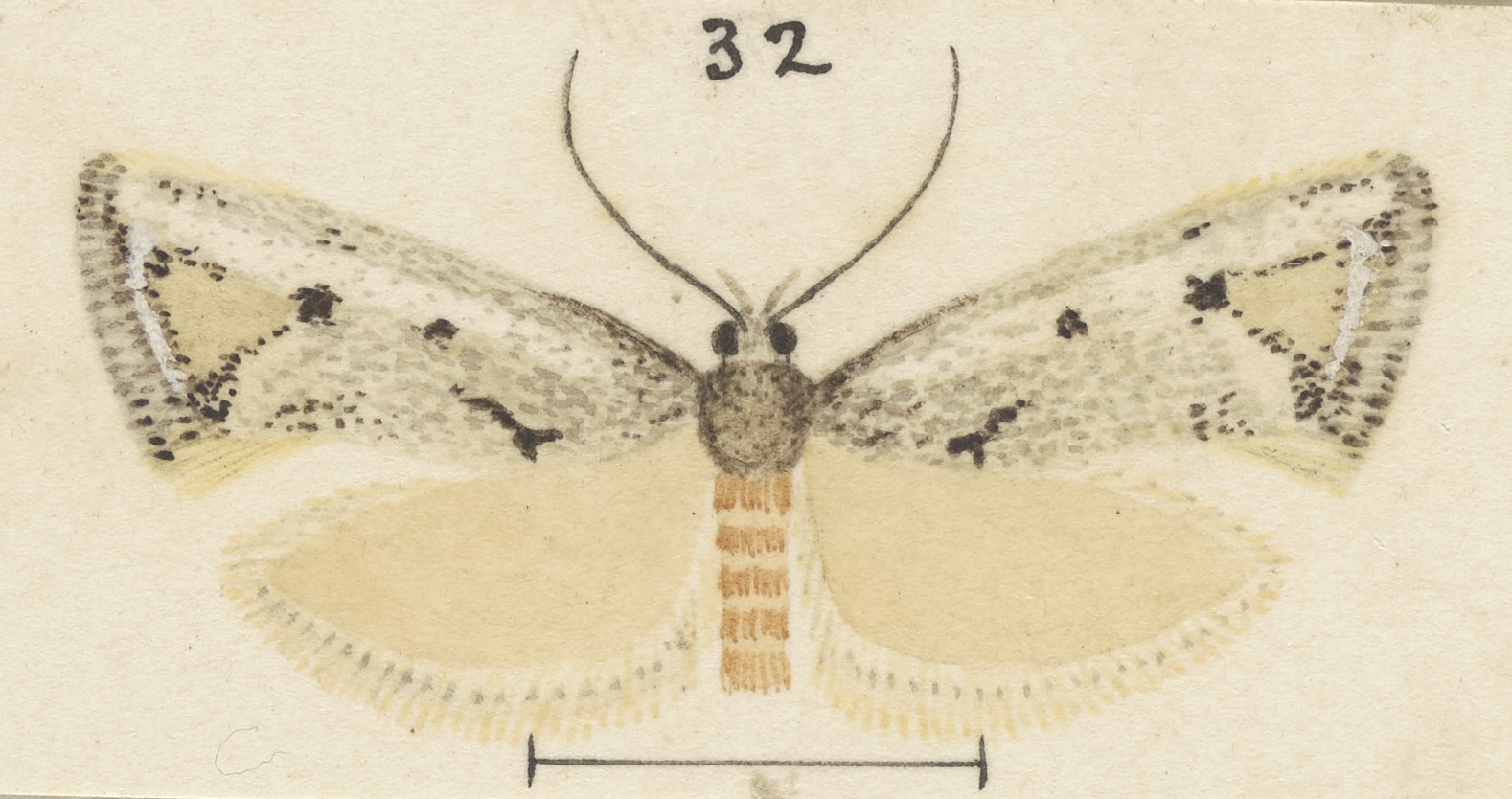
Illustration of T. hemimochla by George Hudson.

Meyrick originally described this species as follows:

Fore wings whitish, irrorated with grey, an oblique mark beneath fold, two discal dots, a bar from anal angle, and sub-apical spot blackish; hind wings whitish-grey; head ochreous-white.

Meyrick in 1884 described this species as follows:

Male, female. — 14 1/2—16 mm. Head ochreous-whitish. Palpi ochreous-whitish, basal 2/3 of second joint, and base and apex of terminal joint suffused with dark fuscous. Antennas grey. Thorax ochreous-whitish, more or less mixed with grey. Abdomen ochreous-whitish. Anterior and middle legs dark fuscous, central ring of middle tibiae, and apex of all joints ochreous-whitish; posterior legs ochreous-whitish. Forewings moderate, costa moderately arched, apex rounded, hindmargin very obliquely rounded'; white, irregularly suffused with whitish-ochreous, and sprinkled with grey and a few blackish scales; costal edge dark fuscous at base; an oblique dark fuscous streak from fold before middle to near inner margin before 1/3, generally distinct on fold only; a blackish dot in disc before middle, and a larger one beyond middle, sometimes connected with apex of oblique streak by a cloudy dark fuscous line; a cloudy dark fuscous bar extending from anal angle almost or quite to second discal dot; a cloudy dark fuscous apical spot, suffusedly produced along hindmargin; sometimes a curved transverse cloudy dark fuscous line near hindmargin, indented inwards beneath costa, often obsolete : cilia whitish, with rows of dark fuscous points, forming a cloudy spot at apex and anal angle. Hindwings whitish-grey or light grey; cilia grey- whitish.

== Distribution ==
This species is endemic to New Zealand and has been observed near Lake Ohia, Pairatahi, Hamilton, Cambridge, Wellington and Napier.

== Behaviour ==
The adults of this species are on the wing from December until March.
