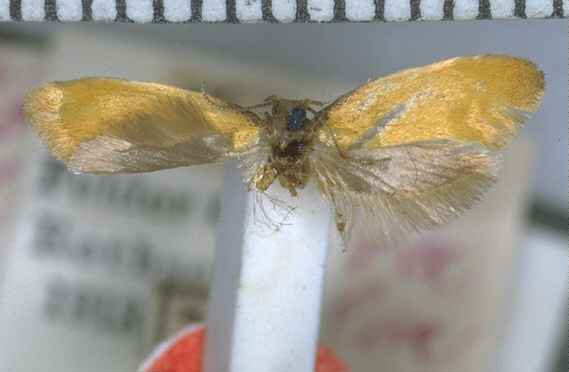
- Male holotype

Scientific classification
- Kingdom: Animalia
- Phylum: Arthropoda
- Class: Insecta
- Order: Lepidoptera
- Family: Oecophoridae
- Genus: Tingena
- Species: T. melinella

Binomial name
- Tingena melinella (Felder & Rogenhofer, 1875)

Synonyms
- Oecophora melinella Felder & Rogenhofer, 1875; Borkhausenia melinella (Felder & Rogenhofer, 1875); Borkhausenia freta Philpott, 1926

= Tingena melinella =

Species of moth, endemic to New Zealand

Tingena melinella is a species of moth in the family Oecophoridae. It is endemic to New Zealand and has been observed in Nelson and Canterbury.

== Taxonomy ==
This species was first described by Felder & Rogenhofer in 1875 and named Oecophora melinella. Felder & Rogenhofer used a specimen collected by T. R. Oxley in Nelson. George Hudson did not mention this species in his book The butterflies and moths of New Zealand. However he did discuss the subsequently synonymised species Borkhausenia freta. In 1988 J. S. Dugdale placed this species within the genus Tingena. In the same publication Dugdale synonymised Borkhausenia freta with T. melinella. The holotype specimen is held at the Natural History Museum, London.

== Description ==
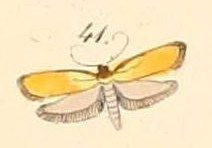
Illustration used in original description of species.

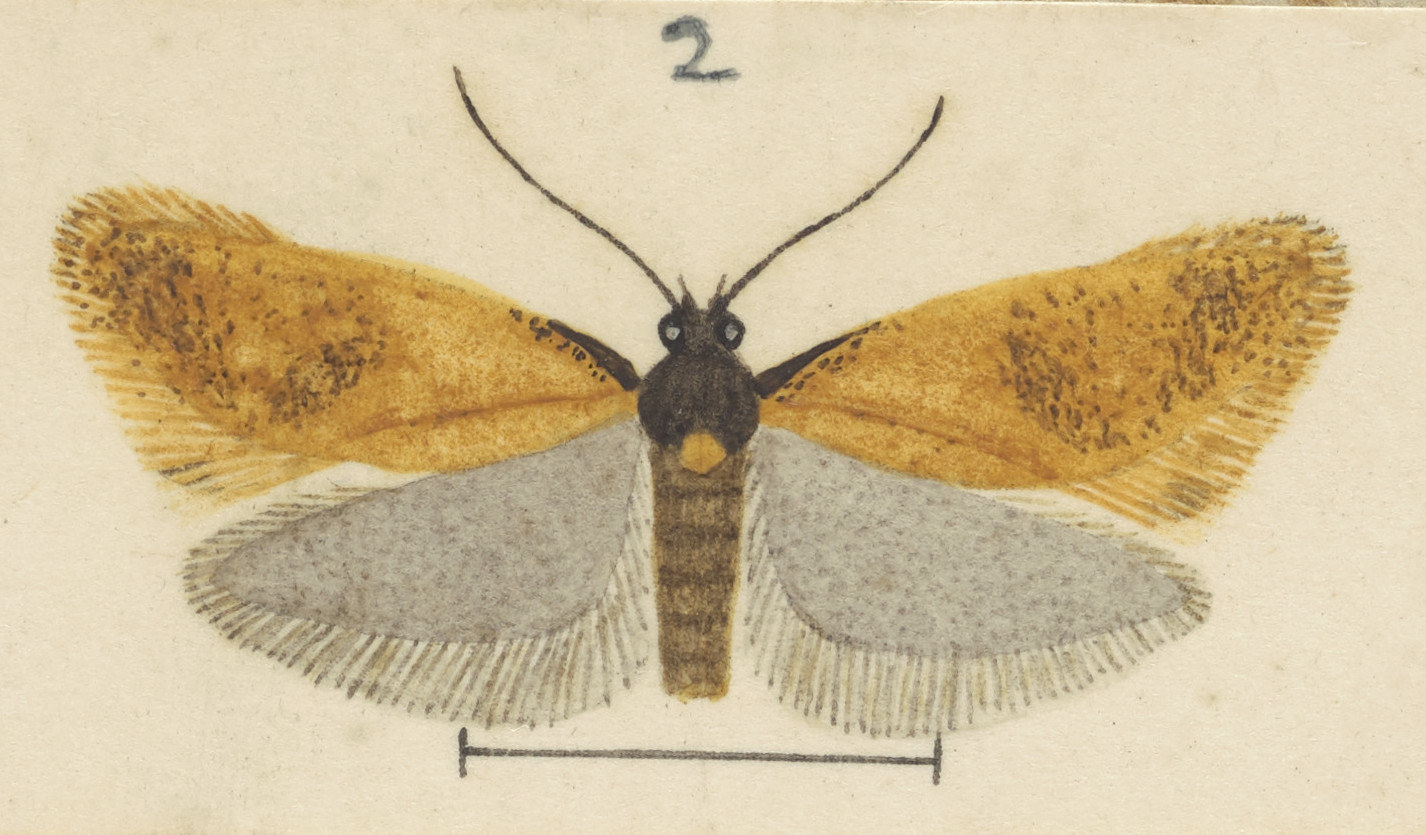
B. freta now known as T. melinella, illustrated by George Hudson.

Hudson, describing the species B. freta, since synonymised with T. melinella, as follows:

The expansion of the wings is slightly under 5/8 inch … has the head, anterior portions of thorax and extreme base of costa, blackish-brown; the fore-wings are also deeper yellow.

== Distribution ==
This species is endemic to New Zealand. It has been observed in Nelson and in Canterbury.
