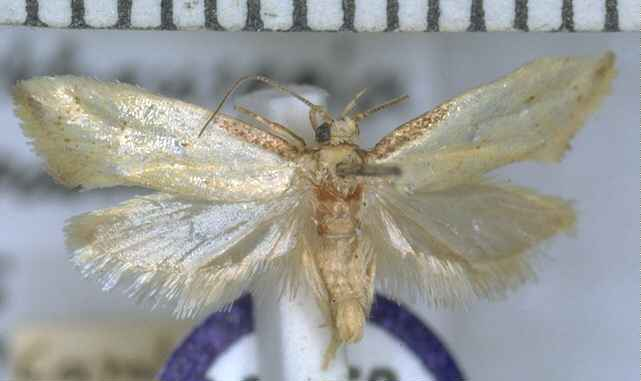
- Male lectotype

Scientific classification
- Kingdom: Animalia
- Phylum: Arthropoda
- Class: Insecta
- Order: Lepidoptera
- Family: Oecophoridae
- Genus: Tingena
- Species: T. apanthes

Binomial name
- Tingena apanthes (Meyrick, 1883)

Synonyms
- Oecophora apanthes Meyrick, 1883; Borkhausenia apanthes (Meyrick, 1883)

= Tingena apanthes =

Species of moth, endemic to New Zealand

Tingena apanthes is a species of moth in the family Oecophoridae. It is endemic to New Zealand and found on the North Island. The adults are on the wing from October to December. It appears associated with Leptospermum species and it has been hypothesised that the appearance of the adults of this species imitates faded Leptospermum leaves.

== Taxonomy ==
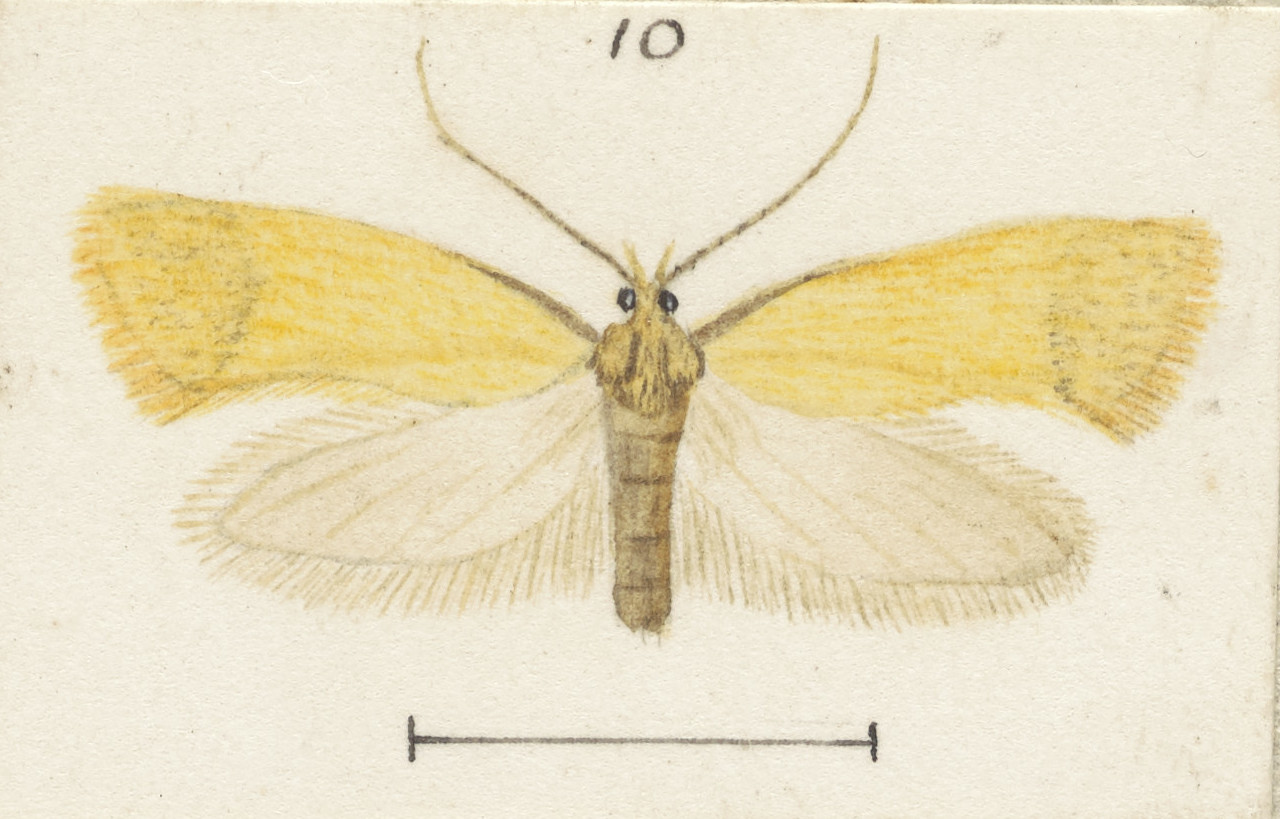
Dubious illustration of T. apanthes by George Hudson.

This species was first described by Edward Meyrick in 1883 using specimens collected at Hamilton and Cambridge in January and named Oecophora apanthes. Meyrick gave a more detailed description under this name in 1884. In 1915 Meyrick placed this species within the Borkhausenia genus. In 1926 Alfred Philpott was unable to study the genitalia of the male of this species as a result of no specimens being available in New Zealand collections. George Hudson discussed and illustrated this species under the name B. apanthes in his 1928 publication The butterflies and moths of New Zealand. In 1988 J. S. Dugdale placed this species in the genus Tingena. He also discussed Hudson's illustration of this species and alleged that it was dubious as Dugdale regarded the illustration as too yellow for T. apanthes. The male lectotype, collected in Cambridge, is held at the Natural History Museum, London.

== Description ==
Meyrick first described this species as follows:

Fore wings pale whitish-ochreous, a blackish streak on base of costa, a small apical spot, sometimes three discal dots and a bar from anal angle dark fuscous; hind wings whitish grey; thorax pale whitish-ochreous, with a dark fuscous interior spot on each shoulder.

Meyrick described this species in more detail as follows:

Male. — 14 1/2 mm. Head pale whitish-ochreous. Palpi pale whitish-ochreous, basal 1/3 of second joint and lower half of terminal joint externally irrorated with dark fuscous. Antennae dark fuscous. Thorax pale whitish-ochreous, with an oblong dark fuscous spot on each shoulder not touching lateral margin. Abdomen ochreous-whitish. Anterior legs dark fuscous; middle legs ochreous-whitish irrorated with dark fuscous except at apex of joints; posterior legs ochreous-whitish. Forewings moderate, costa moderately arched, apex obtuse, hindmargin rounded, rather strongly oblique; pale whitish-ochreous, slightly suffused with pale yellowish; basal third of costa broadly dark fuscous; a dark fuscous dot in disc before middle, a second beyond middle, and a third on fold directly beneath first, first and third sometimes obsolete; sometimes a bar of scattered dark fuscous scales between second dot and anal angle; some scattered dark fuscous scales at apex and towards hindmargin : cilia ochreous-whitish, sometimes with scattered grey points, and with a cloudy dark fuscous spot at apex, and a grey spot at anal angle. Hindwings whitish-grey; cilia whitish.

== Distribution ==
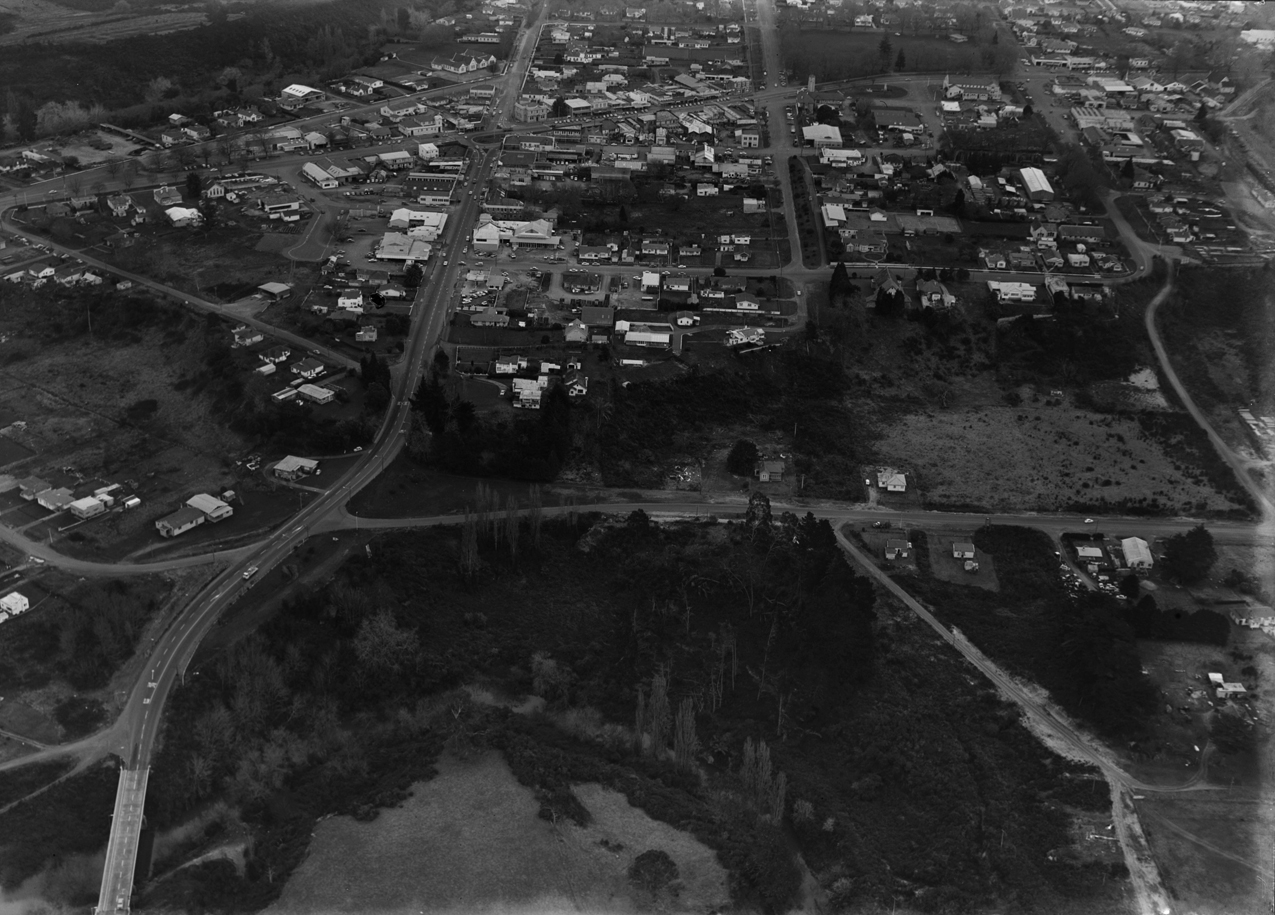
Cambridge, type locality of T. apanthes

It is endemic to New Zealand and has been collected in Wellington as well as Hamilton and Cambridge.

== Behaviour and habitat ==
This species is on the wing from October to May. Hudson commented it was associated with Manuka scrub and that it was likely its appearance imitated faded Manuka leaves.
