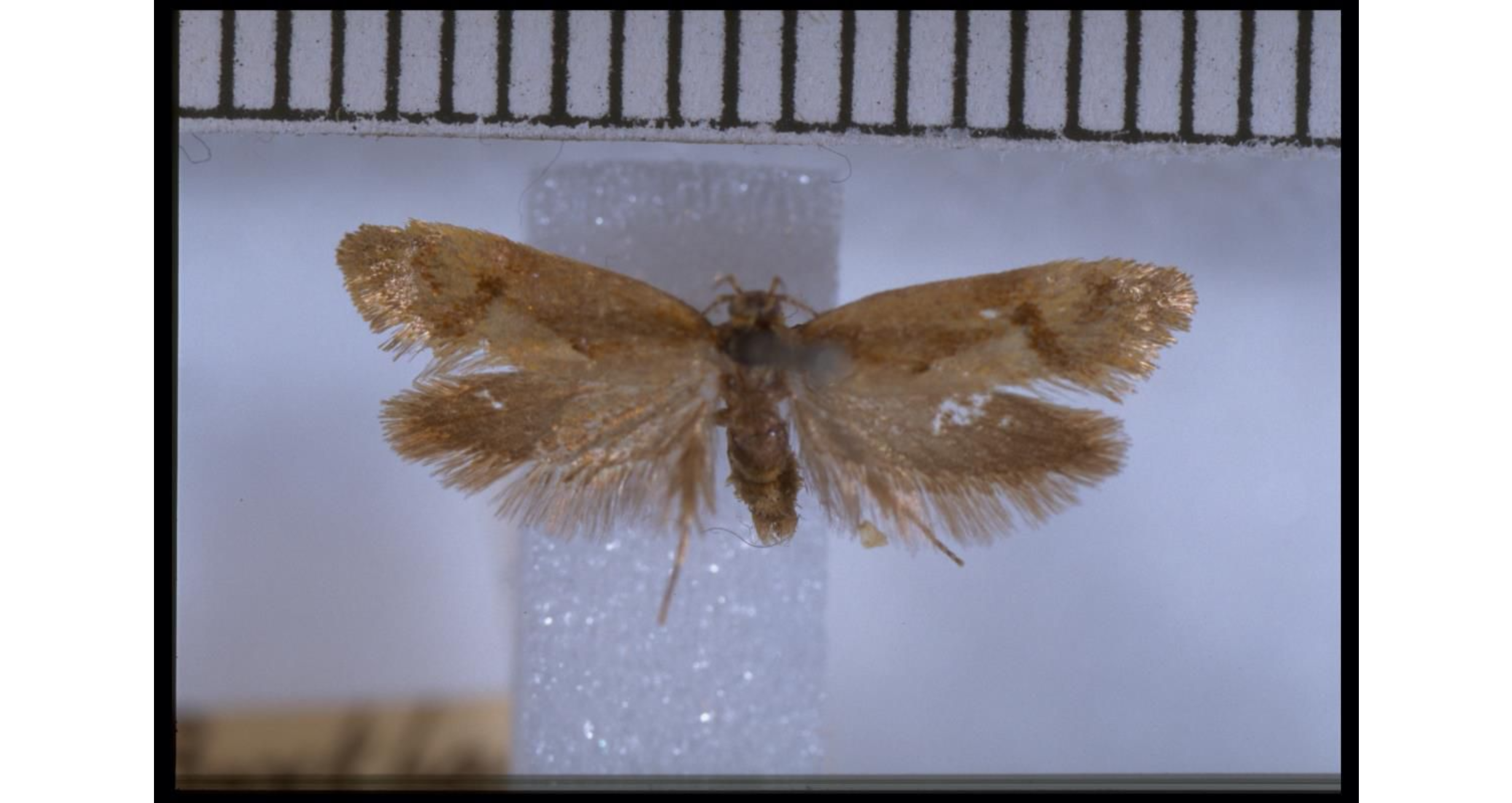
- Male holotype

Conservation status
- Data Deficit (NZ TCS)

Scientific classification
- Kingdom: Animalia
- Phylum: Arthropoda
- Clade: Pancrustacea
- Class: Insecta
- Order: Lepidoptera
- Family: Oecophoridae
- Genus: Tingena
- Species: T. opaca

Binomial name
- Tingena opaca (Philpott, 1926)

Synonyms
- Borkhausenia opaca Philpott, 1926

= Tingena opaca =

Species of moth, endemic to New Zealand

Tingena opaca is a species of moth in the family Oecophoridae. It is endemic to New Zealand and has been observed in the southern parts of the South Island. Adults of this species are on the wing in December. In 2025 this species was classified as "data deficient" under the New Zealand Threat Classification System.

== Taxonomy ==
This species was first described by Alfred Philpott using specimens collected at Bluff in November and December and named Borkhausenia opaca. George Hudson discussed this species in his 1928 book The butterflies and moths of New Zealand under that name. In 1988 J. S. Dugdale placed this species in the genus Tingena. The male holotype specimen is held in the New Zealand Arthropod Collection.

== Description ==
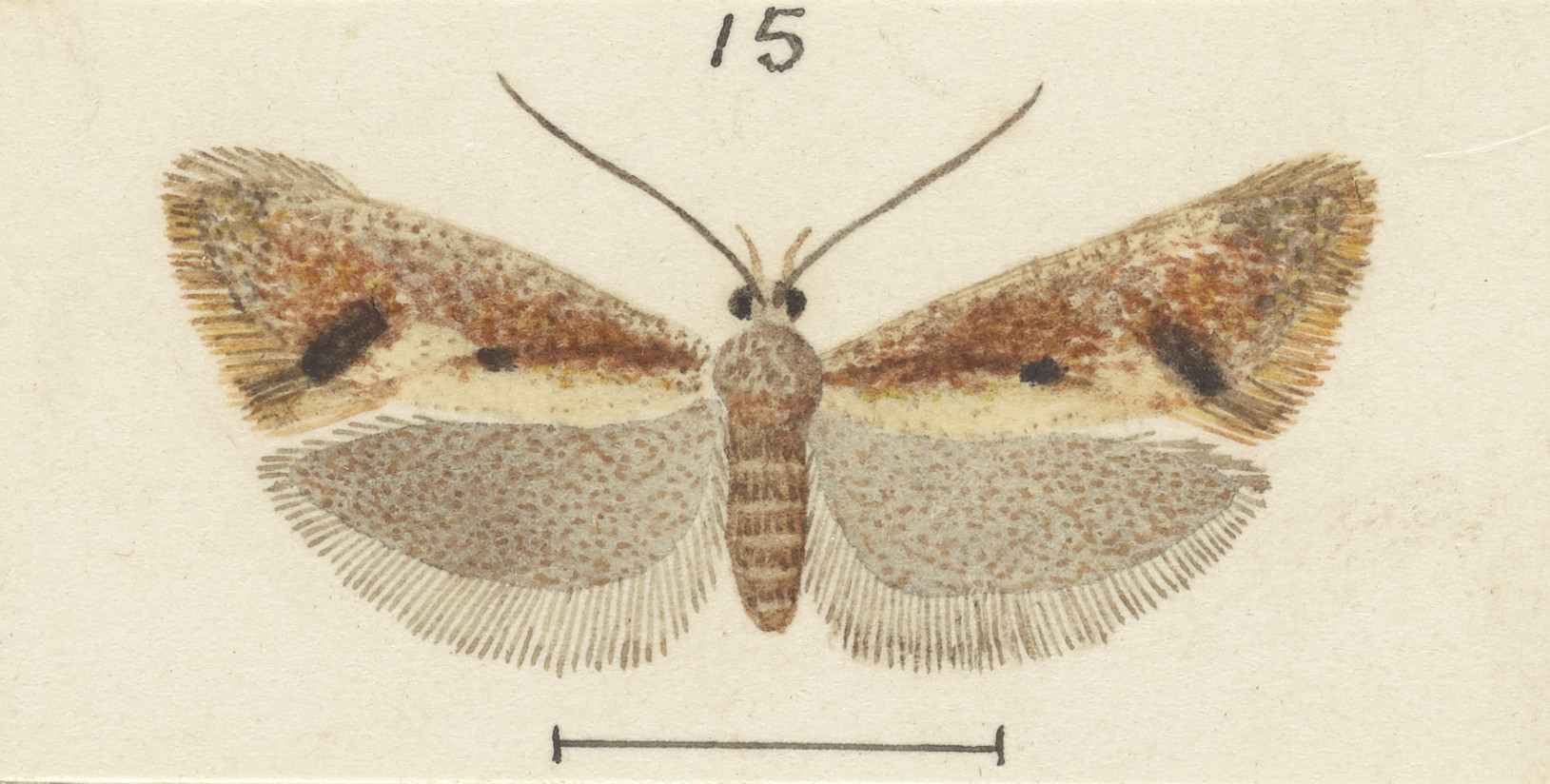
Illustration of T. opaca by George Hudson.

Philpott described this species as follows:

♂ ♀. 15–16 mm. Head dark ochreous. Palpi ochreous mixed with fuscous. Antennae dark brown, ciliations in male 2 ½, whorled. Thorax ochreous mixed with dark brown, tips of tegulae whitish. Abdomen dark shining metallic brown on basal segments, median and posterior segments with yellow band followed by whitish margin, anal tuft ochreous mixed with brown. Legs ochreous, more or less infuscated, tarsi annulated with whitish-ochreous. Forewings, costa hardly arched, apex round-pointed, termen almost straight, oblique; ochreous mixed with ferruginous and whitish; a stripe along dorsum more clearly yellow; a suffused ferruginous fascia from costa beyond middle towards dorsum at ½, ending in a blackish spot below fold; a whitish area posterior to this black spot; a dark ferruginous fascia from tornus, coalescing with median fascia below costa: fringes ochreous, mixed with ferruginous basally. Hindwings greyish-fuscous: fringes fuscous-grey with obscure dark basal line.

This species can be distinguished by its unusual tornal mark and the orange-red scales heavily dusted over the forewings.

== Distribution ==
This species is endemic to New Zealand and has been observed in the southern parts of the South Island.

== Behaviour ==
The adults of this species are on the wing in December.

== Conservation status ==
In 2025 this species was classified by the New Zealand Department of Conservation as "data deficient" under the New Zealand Threat Classification System.
