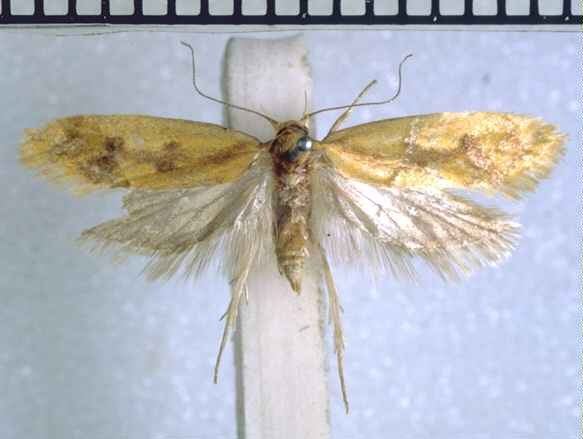
- Female holotype

Scientific classification
- Kingdom: Animalia
- Phylum: Arthropoda
- Class: Insecta
- Order: Lepidoptera
- Family: Oecophoridae
- Genus: Tingena
- Species: T. ophiodryas

Binomial name
- Tingena ophiodryas (Meyrick, 1936)

Synonyms
- Borkhausenia ophiodryas Meyrick, 1936

= Tingena ophiodryas =

Species of moth, endemic to New Zealand

Tingena ophiodryas is a species of moth in the family Oecophoridae. It is endemic to New Zealand and has been observed in Canterbury.

== Taxonomy ==
This species was first described by Edward Meyrick in 1936 and named Borkhausenia ophiodryas using a specimen collected by S. Lindsay in the bush above Le Bon's Bay, on Banks Peninsula in February. In 1939 George Hudson discussed and illustrated this species under the name B. ophiodryas. In 1988 J. S. Dugdale placed this species in the genus Tingena. The female holotype specimen, collected at Little River, Banks Peninsula, is held at the Canterbury Museum.

== Description ==
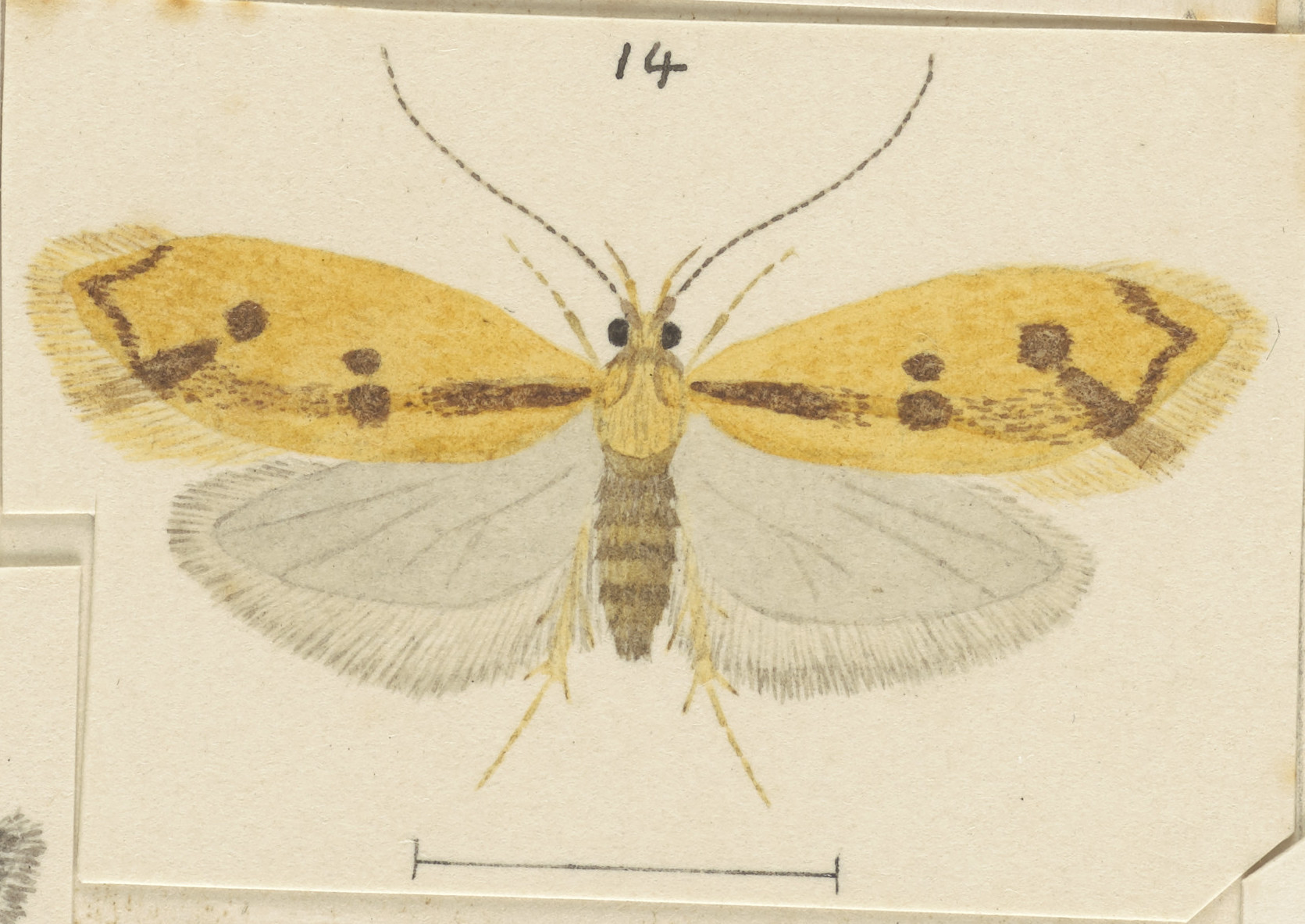
Illustration of T. ophiodryas by George Hudson.

Meyrick described this species as follows:

♀. 17 mm. Head, thorax light ochreous-orange. Palpi whitishochreous. Forewings elongate, slightly dilated, costa gently arched, apex obtuse-pointed, termen rounded, oblique; golden-ochreous-orange; markings ochreous-brown; stigmata forming rounded spots, plical somewhat beyond first discal, a rather narrow sinuous streak proceeding from near base along fold between these and touching second discal beneath, thence directed to tornus, some scattered scales between this and narrow bent bar crossing wing near apex and continued along termen to tornus: cilia orange-yellow. Hindwings grey; cilia whitish-grey.

== Distribution ==
This species is endemic to New Zealand and has been observed in Canterbury.

== Behaviour ==
The adults of this species are on the wing in February.
