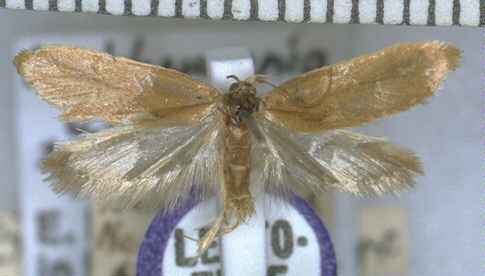
- Male lectotype

Scientific classification
- Kingdom: Animalia
- Phylum: Arthropoda
- Class: Insecta
- Order: Lepidoptera
- Family: Oecophoridae
- Genus: Tingena
- Species: T. eriphaea

Binomial name
- Tingena eriphaea (Meyrick, 1914)

Synonyms
- Borkhausenia eriphaea Meyrick, 1914

= Tingena eriphaea =

Species of moth, endemic to New Zealand

Tingena eriphaea is a species of moth in the family Oecophoridae. It is endemic to New Zealand and has been found in Otago. This species is known to inhabit native beech forest.

== Taxonomy ==
This species was first described by Edward Meyrick in 1914 using specimens collected at Ben Lomond at an altitude of 2500 ft in November and named Borkhausenia eriphaea. In 1926 Alfred Philpott discussed and illustrated the genitalia of the male of this species. In 1928 George Hudson also discussed and illustrated this species in his book The butterflies and moths of New Zealand. In 1988 J. S. Dugdale placed this species within the genus Tingena. The male lectotype is held at the Natural History Museum, London.

== Description ==
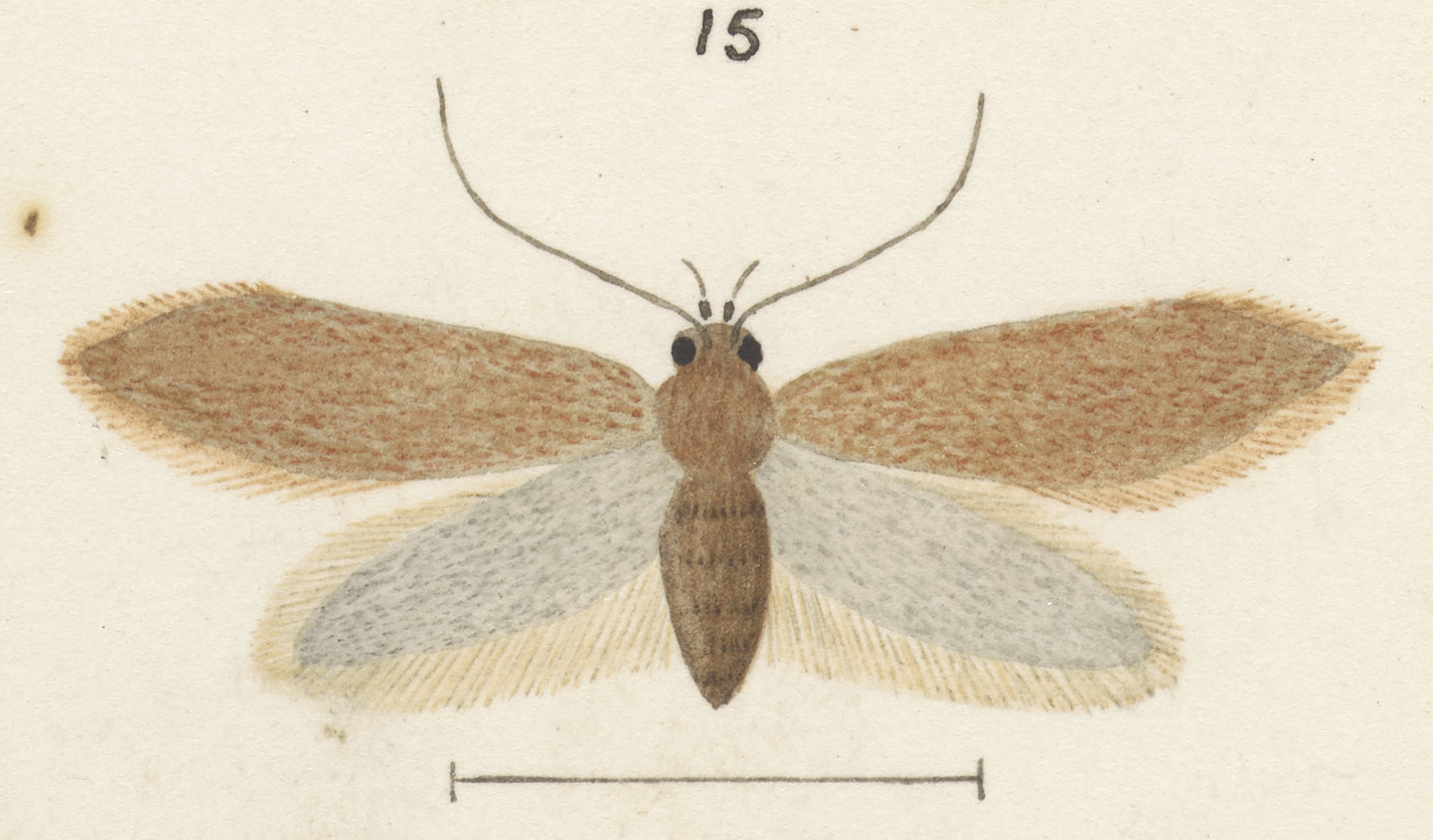
Illustration of T. eriphaea by George Hudson.

Meyrick described this species as follows:

♂. 19-20 mm. Head and thorax dark grey, apex of patagia and posterior edge of thorax pale ochreous. Palpi whitish irro rated with grey. Antennal ciliations 1. Abdomen grey. Forewings elongate, rather narrow, somewhat dilated posteriorly, costa gently arched, apex obtuse, termen very obliquely rounded; lilac-brown, sometimes mixed with grey, anterior half of costa suffused with grey, scales of costal edge whitish from J onwards; dorsum obscurely paler and ochreous-tinged from base to beyond middle, forming an undefined streak of which the upper edge is marked in middle with a black linear dot followed by a whitish mark : cilia pale ochreous suffasedly irrorated with grey. Hindwings grey; cilia pale grey, on costa ochreous-whitish.

== Distribution ==
This species is endemic to New Zealand and has been found in its type locality of Ben Lomond in Otago as well as in Dunedin.

== Habitat ==
This species inhabits native beech forest on mountain sides.
