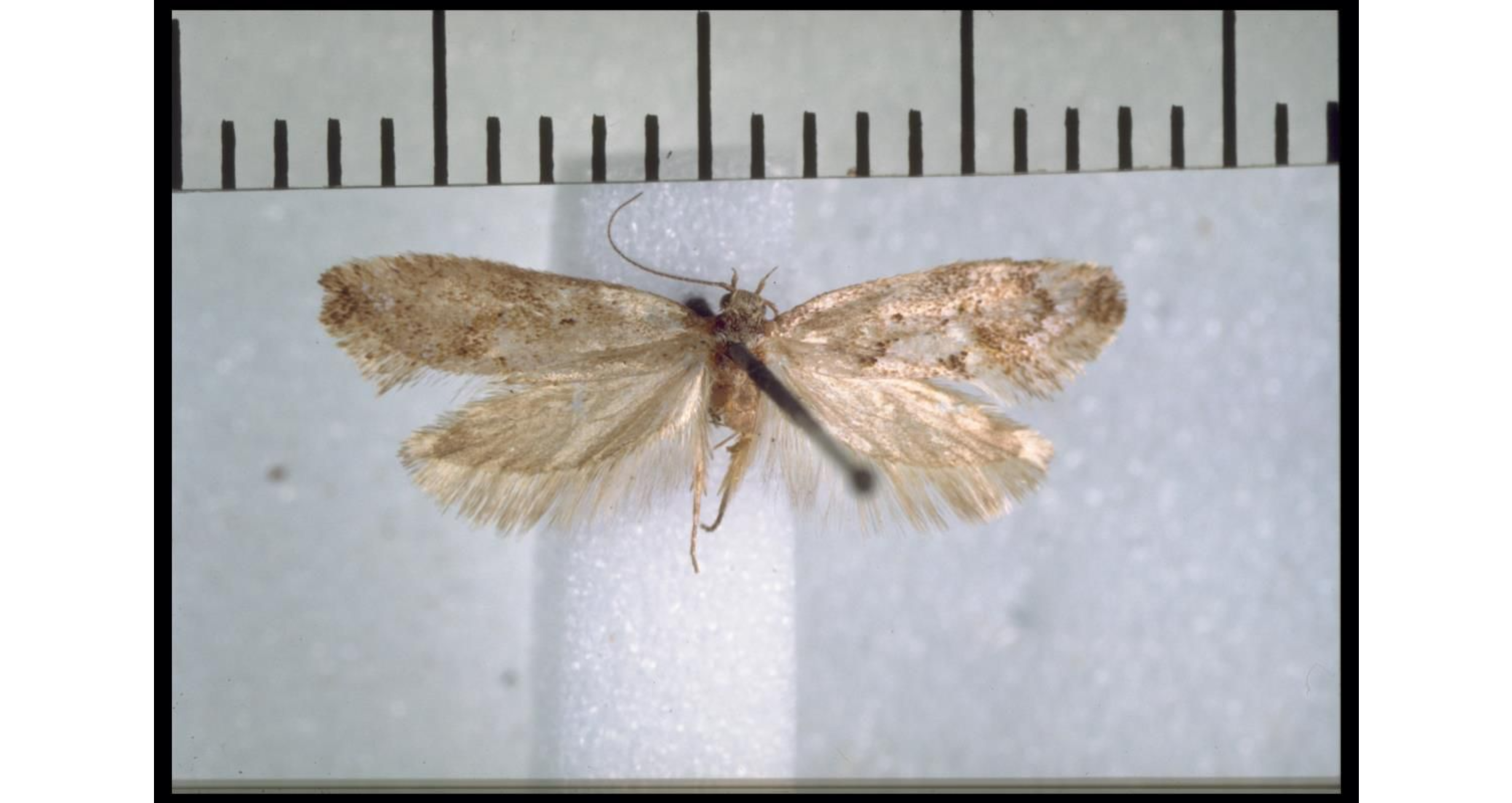
- Male holotype

Scientific classification
- Kingdom: Animalia
- Phylum: Arthropoda
- Class: Insecta
- Order: Lepidoptera
- Family: Oecophoridae
- Genus: Tingena
- Species: T. seclusa

Binomial name
- Tingena seclusa (Philpott, 1921)

Synonyms
- Borkhausenia seclusa Philpott, 1921

= Tingena seclusa =

Species of moth, endemic to New Zealand

Tingena seclusa is a species of moth in the family Oecophoridae. It is endemic to New Zealand and has been observed in the Canterbury and Otago regions. The larvae of this species are litter leaf feeders and the adults of this species are on the wing from December to February.

== Taxonomy ==
This species was first described by Alfred Philpott in 1921 using a male specimen collected at Ben Lomond in December, and another specimen collected at Lake Luna also in December and named Borkhausenia seclusa. George Hudson discussed and illustrated this species under the name Borkhausenia seclusa in his 1928 publication The butterflies and moths of New Zealand. Philpott also discussed this species under the name B. seclusa and illustrated the male genitalia of a paratype specimen. In 1988 J. S. Dugdale placed this species within the genus Tingena. The male holotype specimen, collected at Lake Luna, is held at the New Zealand Arthropod Collection.

== Description ==
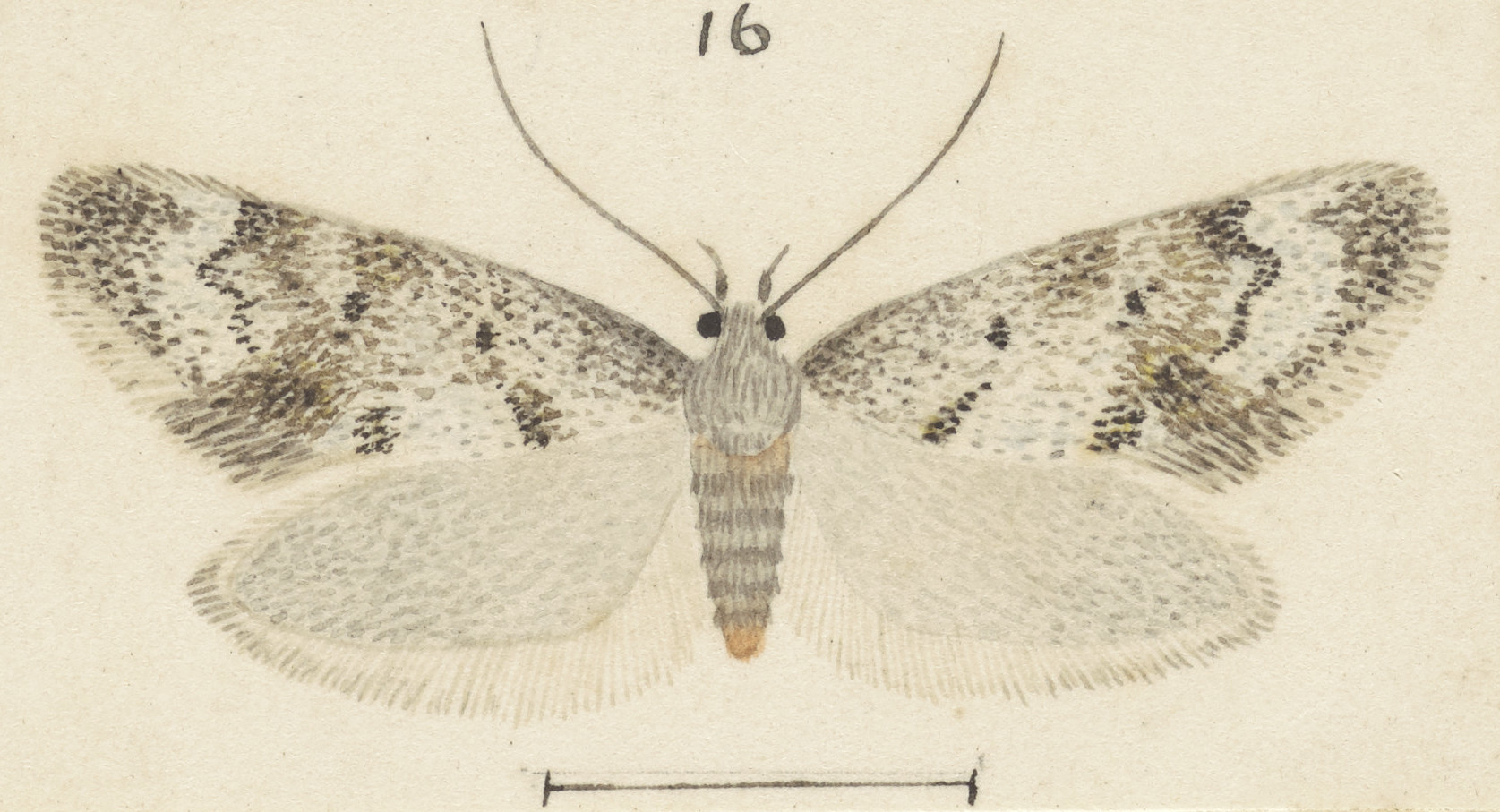
Illustration of T. seclusa by George Hudson.

Philpott first described this species as follows:

♂. 16–17 mm. Head and palpi grey, palpi infuscated beneath. Antennae grey, obscurely annulated with blackish. Thorax fuscous-grey, shoulders brown. Abdomen greyish-brown. Legs ochreous-grey, tarsi infuscated. Forewings rather elongate, costa moderately arched, apex rounded, termen strongly oblique; brownish-grey mixed with white and fuscous; stigmata fuscous, first and second discal in a line, obscurely white-margined; plical before first discal, submerged in oblique fuscous fascia from dorsum to beneath first discal; a subterminal curved fuscous line, indented beneath costa, submerged in brownish-fuscous patch above tornus and reappearing on dorsum before tornus as a triangular spot, broadly margined with white on upper portion; space above apical half of dorsum broadly suffused with white: cilia grey mixed with fuscous, round apex wholly fuscous. Hindwings and cilia grey.

== Distribution ==
This species is endemic to New Zealand and has been observed in the Otago and Canterbury regions.

== Behaviour ==
The adults of this species are on the wing in December to February. The larvae of this species are litter leaf feeders.
