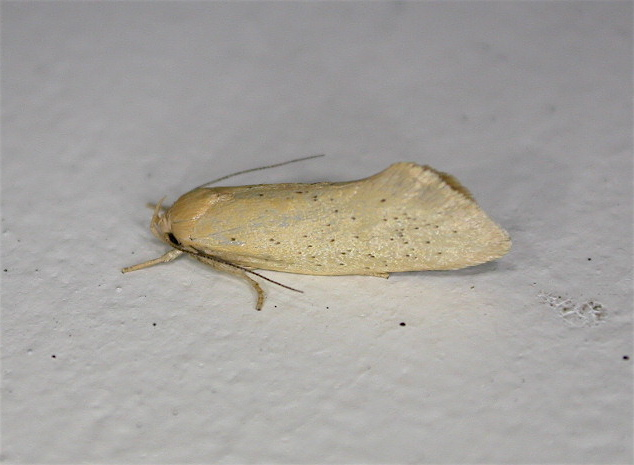
- Tingena armigerella

Scientific classification
- Kingdom: Animalia
- Phylum: Arthropoda
- Clade: Pancrustacea
- Class: Insecta
- Order: Lepidoptera
- Superfamily: Gelechioidea
- Family: Oecophoridae
- Genus: Tingena; Walker, 1864

Synonyms
- Cremnogenes Meyrick, 1883

= Tingena =

Genus of moths

Tingena is a genus of the concealer moth family (Oecophoridae). This genus is endemic to New Zealand.

== Taxonomy ==
This genus was described by Francis Walker in 1864. The type species is Tingena bifaciella Walker, by original monotypy. Tingena bifaciella has been synonymised with Tingena armigerella. As at 2021 this genus is regarded as being in need of revision. There are also several species in this genus that are as yet undescribed.

== Life cycle and hosts ==
The larvae of species within the genus Tingena are active in New Zealand's mid to late summer and slowly continue to mature throughout the autumn and winter. In late spring or early summer they then pupate.

The larvae of all species within the genus Tingena feed on leaf litter and often larvae of species within this genus coexist in the same area. The larva weave two leaves together with silk forming a cocoon like structure in which they live and from which they feed. These cocoons can be found underneath the layer of loose dry leaf litter but above the layer of moist compacted composing leaf matter. As the larva grows it extends the silken tunnels in which it lives ensuring it can move to new feeding sites. When feeding the larva produces a large amount of frass. It has been hypothesised that the smell of this frass attracts parasitic wasps that utilise Tingena larvae as hosts for their offspring.

Muehlenbeckia australis is a known host of species in the genus Tingena with the larvae feeding on the fallen leaves of this plant.

== Species ==
Species in this genus include:

- Tingena actinias (Meyrick, 1901)
- Tingena affinis (Philpott, 1926)
- Tingena afflicta (Philpott, 1926)
- Tingena aletis (Meyrick, 1905)
- Tingena amiculata (Philpott, 1926)
- Tingena anaema (Meyrick, 1883)
- Tingena ancogramma (Meyrick, 1919)
- Tingena apanthes (Meyrick, 1883)
- Tingena apertella (Walker, 1864)
- Tingena aphrontis (Meyrick, 1883)
- Tingena armigerella (Walker, 1864)
- Tingena aurata (Philpott, 1931)
- Tingena basella (Walker, 1863)
- Tingena berenice (Meyrick, 1929)
- Tingena brachyacma (Meyrick, 1909)
- Tingena chloradelpha (Meyrick, 1905)
- Tingena chloritis (Meyrick, 1883)
- Tingena chrysogramma (Meyrick, 1883)
- Tingena clarkei (Philpott, 1928)
- Tingena collitella (Walker, 1864)
- Tingena compsogramma (Meyrick, 1920)
- Tingena contextella (Walker, 1864)
- Tingena crotala (Meyrick, 1915)
- Tingena decora (Philpott, 1928)
- Tingena enodis (Philpott, 1927)
- Tingena epichalca (Meyrick, 1886)
- Tingena epimylia (Meyrick, 1883)
- Tingena eriphaea (Meyrick, 1914)
- Tingena eumenopa (Meyrick, 1926)
- Tingena falsiloqua (Meyrick, 1932)
- Tingena fenestrata (Philpott, 1926)
- Tingena grata (Philpott, 1927)
- Tingena griseata (Butler, 1877)
- Tingena hastata (Philpott, 1916)
- Tingena hemimochla (Meyrick, 1883)
- Tingena homodoxa (Meyrick, 1883)
- Tingena honesta (Philpott, 1929)
- Tingena honorata (Philpott, 1918)
- Tingena hoplodesma (Meyrick, 1883)
- Tingena horaea (Meyrick, 1883)
- Tingena idiogama (Meyrick, 1924)
- Tingena innotella (Walker, 1864)
- Tingena lassa (Philpott, 1930)
- Tingena laudata (Philpott, 1930)
- Tingena letharga (Meyrick, 1883)
- Tingena levicula (Philpott, 1930)
- Tingena loxotis (Meyrick, 1905)
- Tingena macarella (Meyrick, 1883)
- Tingena maranta (Meyrick, 1886)
- Tingena marcida (Philpott, 1927)
- Tingena melanamma (Meyrick, 1905)
- Tingena melinella (Felder & Rogenhofer, 1875)
- Tingena monodonta (Meyrick, 1911)
- Tingena morosa (Philpott, 1926)
- Tingena nycteris (Meyrick, 1890)
- Tingena ombrodella (Hudson, 1950)
- Tingena opaca (Philpott, 1926)
- Tingena ophiodryas (Meyrick, 1936)
- Tingena oporaea (Meyrick, 1883)
- Tingena oxyina (Meyrick, 1883)
- Tingena pallidula (Philpott, 1924)
- Tingena paratrimma (Meyrick, 1910)
- Tingena paula (Philpott, 1927)
- Tingena penthalea (Meyrick, 1905)
- Tingena perichlora (Meyrick, 1907)
- Tingena pharmactis (Meyrick, 1905)
- Tingena phegophylla (Meyrick, 1883)
- Tingena plagiatella (Walker, 1863)
- Tingena pronephela (Meyrick, 1907)
- Tingena robiginosa (Philpott, 1915)
- Tingena seclusa (Philpott, 1921)
- Tingena serena (Philpott, 1926)
- Tingena siderodeta (Meyrick, 1883)
- Tingena siderota (Meyrick, 1888)
- Tingena sinuosa (Philpott, 1928)
- Tingena tephrophanes (Meyrick, 1929)
- Tingena terrena (Philpott, 1926)
- Tingena thalerodes (Meyrick, 1916)
- Tingena vestita (Philpott, 1926)
- Tingena xanthodesma (Philpott, 1923)
- Tingena xanthomicta (Meyrick, 1916)
