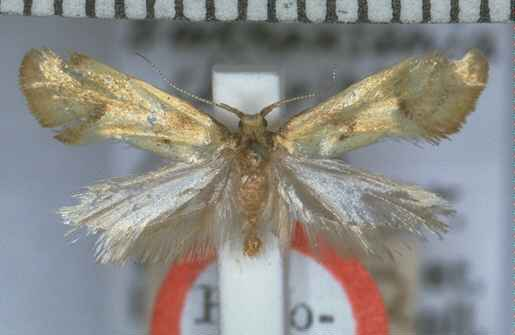
- Male holotype

Scientific classification
- Kingdom: Animalia
- Phylum: Arthropoda
- Class: Insecta
- Order: Lepidoptera
- Family: Oecophoridae
- Genus: Tingena
- Species: T. chloritis

Binomial name
- Tingena chloritis (Meyrick, 1883)

Synonyms
- Oecophora chloritis Meyrick, 1883; Borkhausenia chloritis (Meyrick, 1883)

= Tingena chloritis =

Species of moth, endemic to New Zealand

Tingena chloritis is a species of moth in the family Oecophoridae. It is endemic to New Zealand and has been found in the South Island. Larvae of this species feed on leaf litter. The adults of this species are light flyers and are attracted to light.

== Taxonomy ==
This species was first described by Edward Meyrick in 1883 using a specimen he collected at Lake Wakatipu at 1000 ft in December and named Oecophora chloritis. Meyrick gave a more detailed description under this name in 1884. In 1915 Meyrick placed this species within the Borkhausenia genus. In 1926 Alfred Philpott was unable to study the genitalia of the male of this species as a result of no specimens being available in New Zealand collections. George Hudson discussed this species under the name B. chloritis in his 1928 publication The butterflies and moths of New Zealand. In 1988 J. S. Dugdale placed this species in the genus Tingena. The male lectotype is held at the Natural History Museum, London.

== Description ==
Meyrick originally described the species as follows:

Fore wings whitish-yellowish, base of costa and a dot beneath fold black, an oblique anterior fascia reaching fold, a bar from anal angle, and a posterior transverse line obscurely grey; hind wings grey.

Meyrick went into more detail in 1884 and described the species as follows:

Male. — 15 mm. Head whitish-ochreous yellow. Palpi whitish-ochreous, second joint externally mixed with dark fuscous. Antennae ochreous-whitish, obscurely annulated with dark fuscous. Thorax dark fuscous, posterior margin whitish-yellowish. Abdomen whitish-grey. Legs dark fuscous, posterior tibiae and apex of all joints whitish-yellowish. Forewings moderate, costa moderately arched, apex pointed, hindmargin very oblique, slightly rounded; pale dull whitish-yellowish; base of costa suffusedly dark fuscous; a very oblique indistinct grey streak from near costa at 1/4 to middle of fold; a blackish dot below fold a little before extremity of this streak; a cloudy dark grey transverse mark on anal angle; a faint greyish posterior suffusion, obscurely indicating a transverse line very near handmargin : cilia pale dull whitish-yellowish, with several rows of dark grey points, most distinct towards tips. Hindwings grey; cilia whitish, with a cloudy grey line near base.

Hudson stated that this species:

Differs from all other yellow species in the more elongate fore-wings and the transverse anterior and sub-marginal grey lines.

== Distribution ==
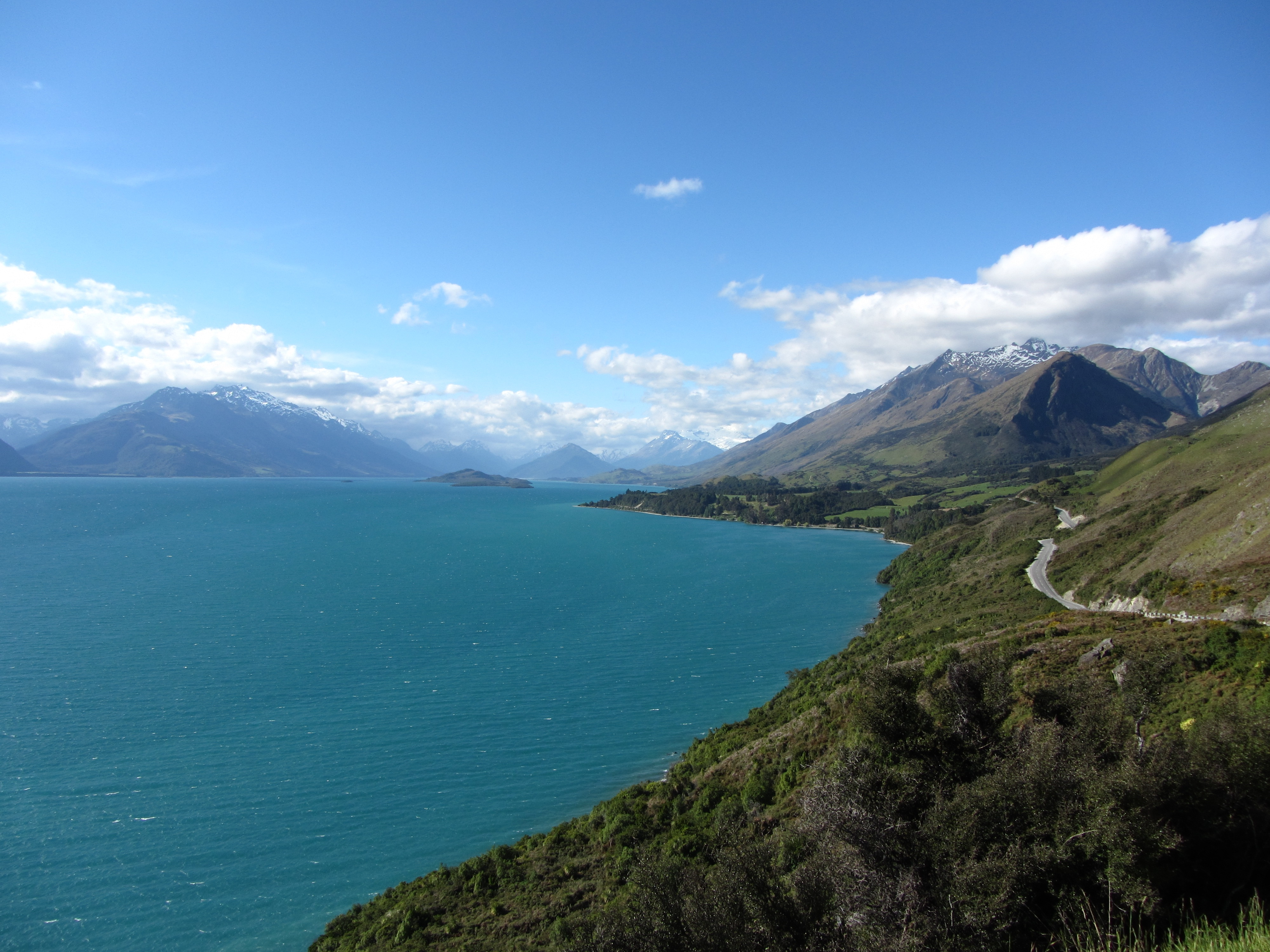
Lake Wakatipu, type of locality T. chloritis.

This species is endemic to New Zealand. Other than the type locality of Lake Wakatipu this species has also been found in the Cass Basin, in Canterbury, .

== Behaviour ==
The adults of this species are on the wing in November and E. G. White regarded this species as a "light flyer". This species is attracted to light. The larvae of this species are leaf litter feeders.
