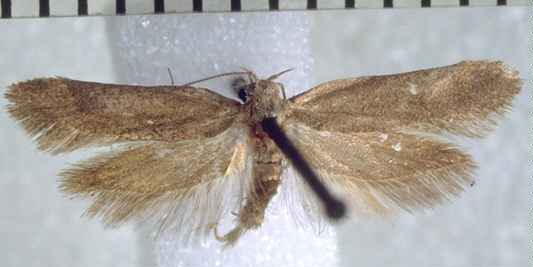
- Male holotype

Scientific classification
- Kingdom: Animalia
- Phylum: Arthropoda
- Class: Insecta
- Order: Lepidoptera
- Family: Oecophoridae
- Genus: Tingena
- Species: T. terrena

Binomial name
- Tingena terrena (Philpott, 1926)

Synonyms
- Borkhausenia terrena Philpott, 1926

= Tingena terrena =

Species of moth, endemic to New Zealand

Tingena terrena is a species of moth in the family Oecophoridae. It is endemic to New Zealand and has been observed in Otago. The adults of this species are on the wing in December.

== Taxonomy ==
This species was first described by Alfred Philpott using specimens collected on the lower slopes of Ben Lomond in Queenstown in December. Philpott originally named the species Borkhausenia terrena. In that publication Philpott also studied and illustrated the genitalia of the male of this species. George Hudson discussed this species in his 1928 book The butterflies and moths of New Zealand as a synonym of B. melanamma. In 1988 J. S. Dugdale placed this species in the genus Tingena. The male holotype specimen is held in the New Zealand Arthropod Collection.

== Description ==
Philpott described this species as follows:

13–15 mm. Head, palpi, and thorax greyish-brown. Antennae greyish-brown spotted with whitish. Abdomen brown, segmental divisions lead-coloured. Legs greyish-brown, posterior pair mixed with whitish. Forewings elongate, not posteriorly dilated, costa almost straight, sub-sinuate at middle, apex round-pointed, termen very oblique; greyish-brown, rather darker apically: fringes concolorous with wings. Hind-wings and fringes fuscous-brown.

This species is very similar in appearance to T. melanamma but can be distinguished as it has no markings on its forewings and the contours of its forewings are also different.

== Distribution ==
This species is endemic to New Zealand and has been observed in Otago.

== Behaviour ==
Adults of this species are on the wing in December.
