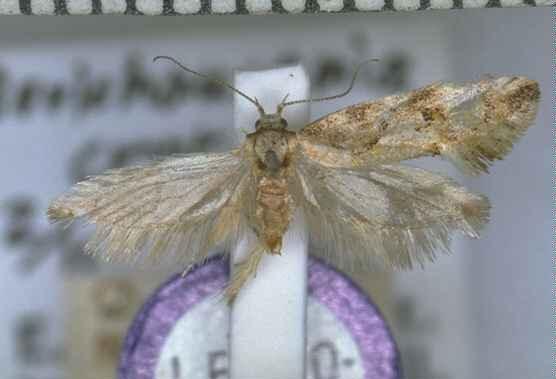
- Male lectotype

Scientific classification
- Kingdom: Animalia
- Phylum: Arthropoda
- Class: Insecta
- Order: Lepidoptera
- Family: Oecophoridae
- Genus: Tingena
- Species: T. crotala

Binomial name
- Tingena crotala (Meyrick, 1915)

Synonyms
- Borkhausenia crotala Meyrick, 1915; Borkhausenia plagiatella Walker, 1863; Oecophora contextella (not of Walker) Meyrick, 1884

= Tingena crotala =

Species of moth, endemic to New Zealand

Tingena crotala is a species of moth in the family Oecophoridae. It is endemic to New Zealand and is found both in the North and South Islands. This species inhabits native forest and is on the wing in November and December.

== Taxonomy ==
This species was first described by Edward Meyrick in 1915 and named Borkhausenia crotala. Meyrick was proposing the species name B. crotala for his conception of Walker's Oecophora contextella. George Hudson discussed and illustrated this species under the name Borkhausenia plagiatella in his 1928 publication The butterflies and moths of New Zealand, having synonymised B. crotala in that publication. Alfred Philpott also discussed this species under the name B. plagiatella. In that publication Philpott recommended that the two forms encapsulated by the concepts B. crotala and B. plagiatella be separated on the basis of the differences in the male genitalia. In 1988 J. S. Dugdale resurrected the species originally described by Meyrick in 1915 and placed it within the genus Tingena. The male lectotype, collected in Dunedin, is held in the Natural History Museum, London.

== Description ==
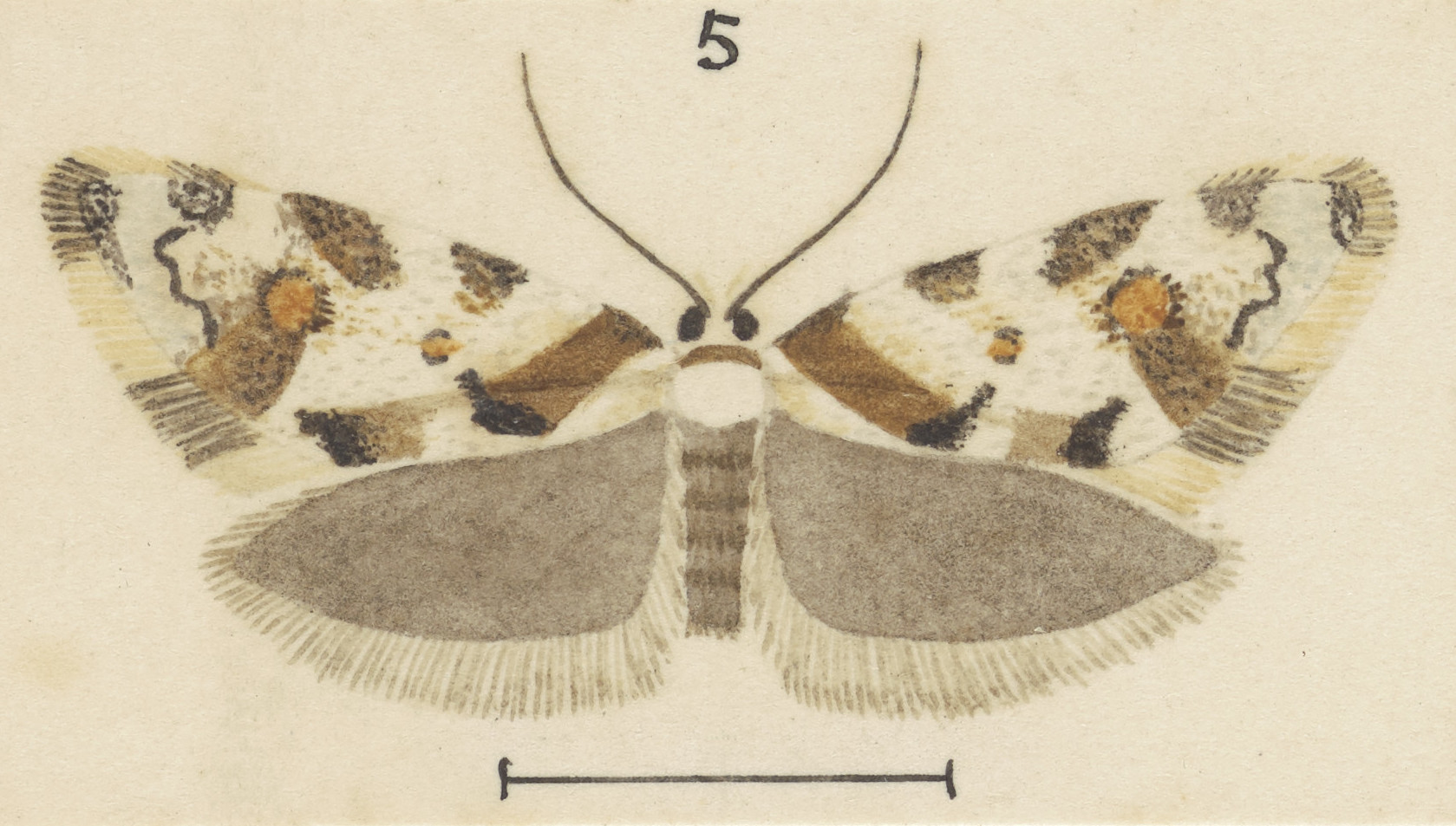
Borkhausenia plagiatella, now known as Tingena crotala, typical male as illustrated by George Hudson.

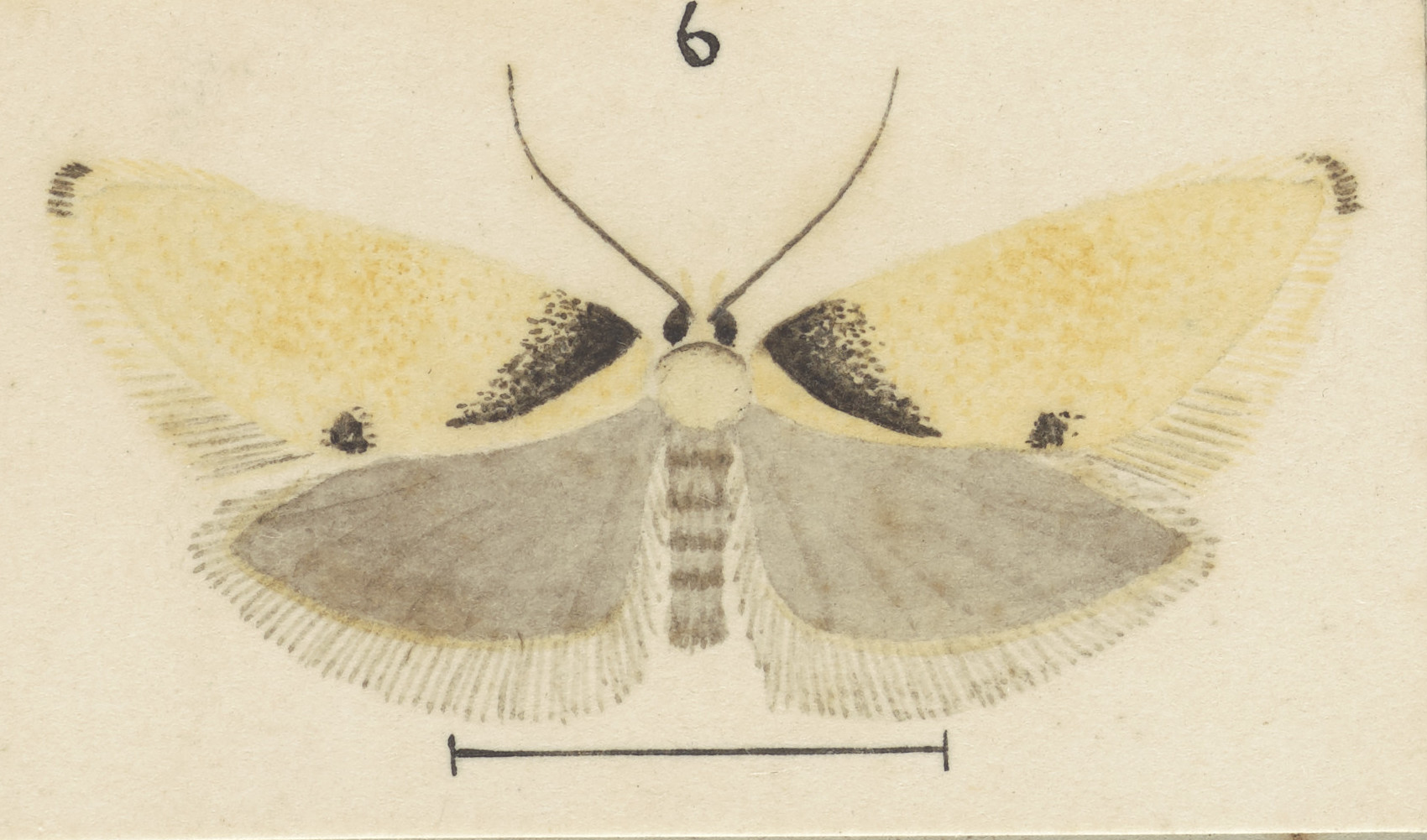
Borkhausenia plagiatella, now known as Tingena crotala pale variety of male as illustrated by George Hudson.

This species is variable in appearance. T. crotala has a white scaled head. Meyrick described his conception of Walker's B. contextella, later to be named B. crotala, as follows:

Male, female. — 13-15 mm. Head ochreous-white. Palpi white, second joint irrorated with dark fuscous except at apex, terminal joint with a cloudy dark fuscous submedian ring. Antennae grey. Thorax whitish or ochreous-white, anterior margin suffused with dark fuscous. Abdomen whitish-ochreous. Legs dark fuscous, middle tibiae with central and apical rings, hairs of posterior tibiae, and apex of all tarsal joints ochreous-whitish. Forewings moderate, costa moderately arched, apex rounded, hindmargin very obliquely rounded; white, irregularly irrorated with fuscous-grey; a cloudy dark grey fascia from base of costa, and a second from costa at 1/4, confluent in middle and extending almost to inner margin at 1/3, mixed with ochreous at apex, and margined posteriorly by an oblique blackish streak below middle, sometimes connected with a blackish dot in disc before middle; a cloudy dark grey fascia spot on costa at 4/5, giving rise to a curved cloudy blackish-grey transverse line to anal angle; all these grey markings are sometimes partially suffused and confluent; a cloudy dark grey apical spot : cilia white, irregularly mixed with dark grey, forming a cloudy spot at apex and anal angle. Hind-wings pale grey; cilia grey-whitish.

== Distribution ==
T. crotala is endemic to New Zealand and has been observed in Auckland, Waimarino, Christchurch, Dunedin, Invercargill, Lake Wakatipu.

== Behaviour ==
Adults are on the wing in November and December.

== Habitat ==
This species has been collected in native forest but is also said to have an affinity with Cupressus macrocarpa. The larvae of this species feeds on leaf litter.
