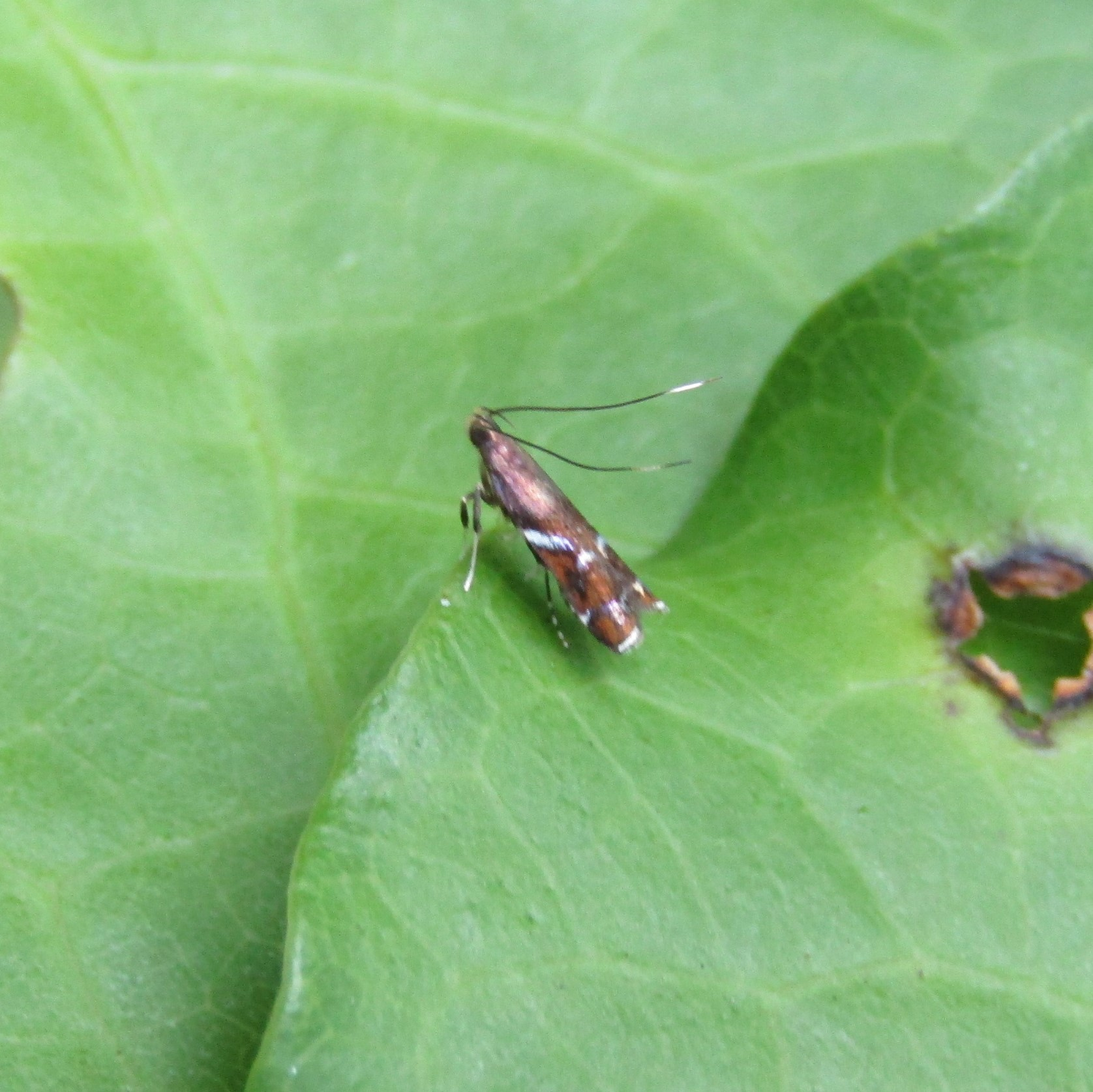

Scientific classification
- Kingdom: Animalia
- Phylum: Arthropoda
- Clade: Pancrustacea
- Class: Insecta
- Order: Lepidoptera
- Family: Lecithoceridae
- Genus: Compsistis
- Species: C. bifaciella

Binomial name
- Compsistis bifaciella (Walker, 1864)

Synonyms
- Gelechia bifaciella Walker, 1864

= Compsistis bifaciella =

Species of moth endemic to New Zealand

Compsistis bifaciella is a moth of the family Lecithoceridae. It was first described by Francis Walker in 1864. It is endemic to New Zealand and is found throughout the North Island. C. bifaciella inhabit native forest. Larvae feed on leaf litter, live in a silk gallery either on the ground or in tree ferns.They pupate in a leaf litter coated, dome shaped, cocoon normally resting on a dead leaf. Adults are day flying and can be difficult to observe when on the wing. They are on the wing from October to February and are known to be active on sunny days. Adults have been observed swarming amongst Brachyglottis repanda during November and December, and bask on that plant's leaves in bright sunshine. This moth has been collected via sweeping of vegetation, blacklight and malaise traps.

== Taxonomy ==
This species was first described by Francis Walker in 1864 using specimens collected in Auckland by Daniel Bolton and originally named Gelechia bifaciella. Edward Meyrick, in 1888, placed this species in the genus Compsistis. George Hudson discussed and illustrated C. bifaciella in his 1928 book The butterflies and moths of New Zealand and discussed it again in his 1939 Supplement to the butterflies and moths of New Zealand. In 1996 John S. Dugdale placed this species in the family Lecithoceridae. In 2005 Robert Hoare accepted this placement. The female lectotype is held at the Natural History Museum, London.

== Description ==
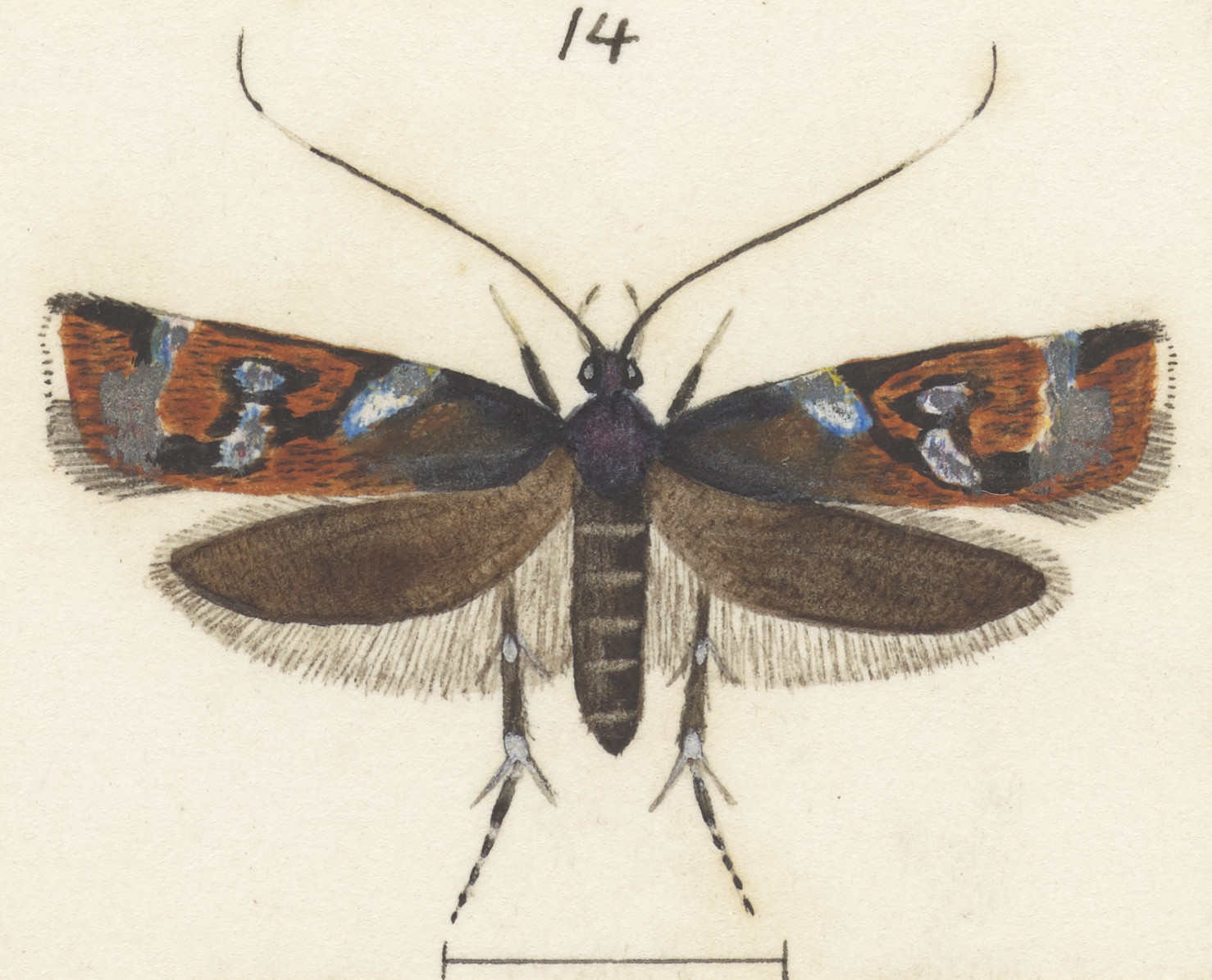
Illustration by Hudson.

Dugdale described the larva of this species as follows:

Body with bands of short, stiff setulae on broad sclerites (pinacula) only; thoracic SV setal group (above foreleg base) with 6—10 short setulae arranged horizontally; head capsule ventrally with menrum simple (no concave sclerite, no paired dark slits); body length 10 mm

Hudson described the adult moth as follows:

The expansion of the wings is about seven-sixteenths of an inch. The fore-wings are rather elongate, oblong, with the tornus considerably rounded; shining coppery-brown thinly sprinkled with black scales; there is a small silvery patch near the base, a broad oblique band on the costa at about 1/3 reaching half across the wing; an irregular patch near the middle and a curved sub-terminal band, broadest near the middle; all these silvery-white markings gleam with iridescent purple; the cilia near the apex are shining white tipped with black. The hind-wings are grey with coppery-brown reflections. The legs are black banded with shining white and the antennae have a broad white band immediately before the apex.

Hudson described the adult moths as jewel like.

== Distribution ==
This species is endemic to New Zealand and found throughout the North Island.

== Habitat and hosts ==
This species inhabits native forest. They are also known to inhabit stands of Kunzea ericoides. Larvae feed on leaf litter, living in a silk gallery either on the ground or in tree ferns. They pupate in a leaf litter coated dome shaped cocoon normally resting on a dead leaf.

== Behaviour ==
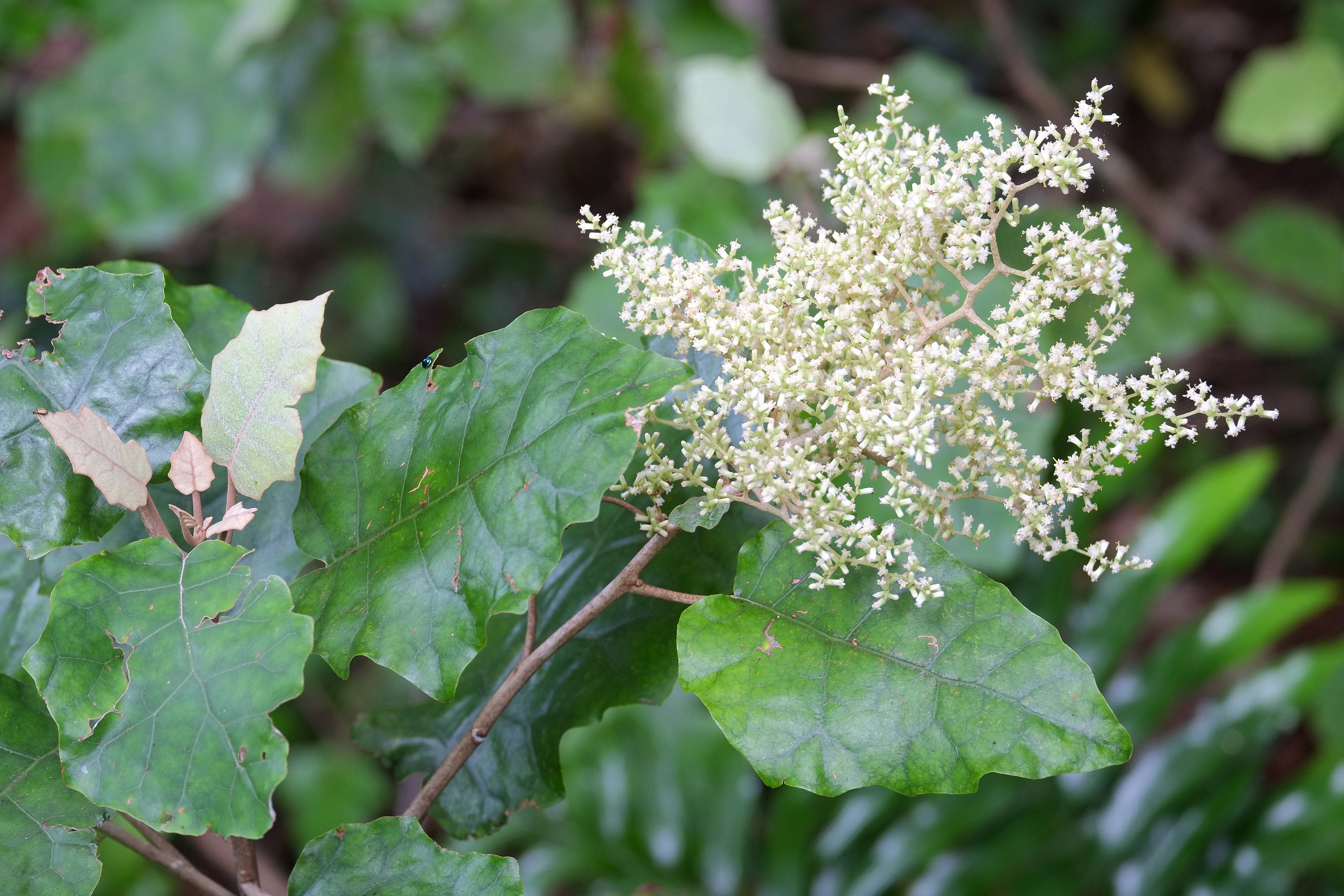
Brachyglottis repanda.

The adults of this species are on the wing from October to January, though occasionally they have also been recorded in February. It is a day flying moth and is difficult to observe when on the wing. Adults tend be active on sunny days and but can be observed when settled on leaves. Adults are known to swarm amongst Brachyglottis repanda during November and December, and bask on leaves in the sunshine. At rest adults have their fore portions slightly raised. The moth stands on all three pairs of legs which are placed backwards; the wings are slightly wrapped around the body, their posterior extremity touching the ground. The antennae are placed backwards, considerably divergent, usually not touching wings.

This species has been collected via sweeping of vegetation and malaise traps. Adult moths are also attracted to blacklight traps.
