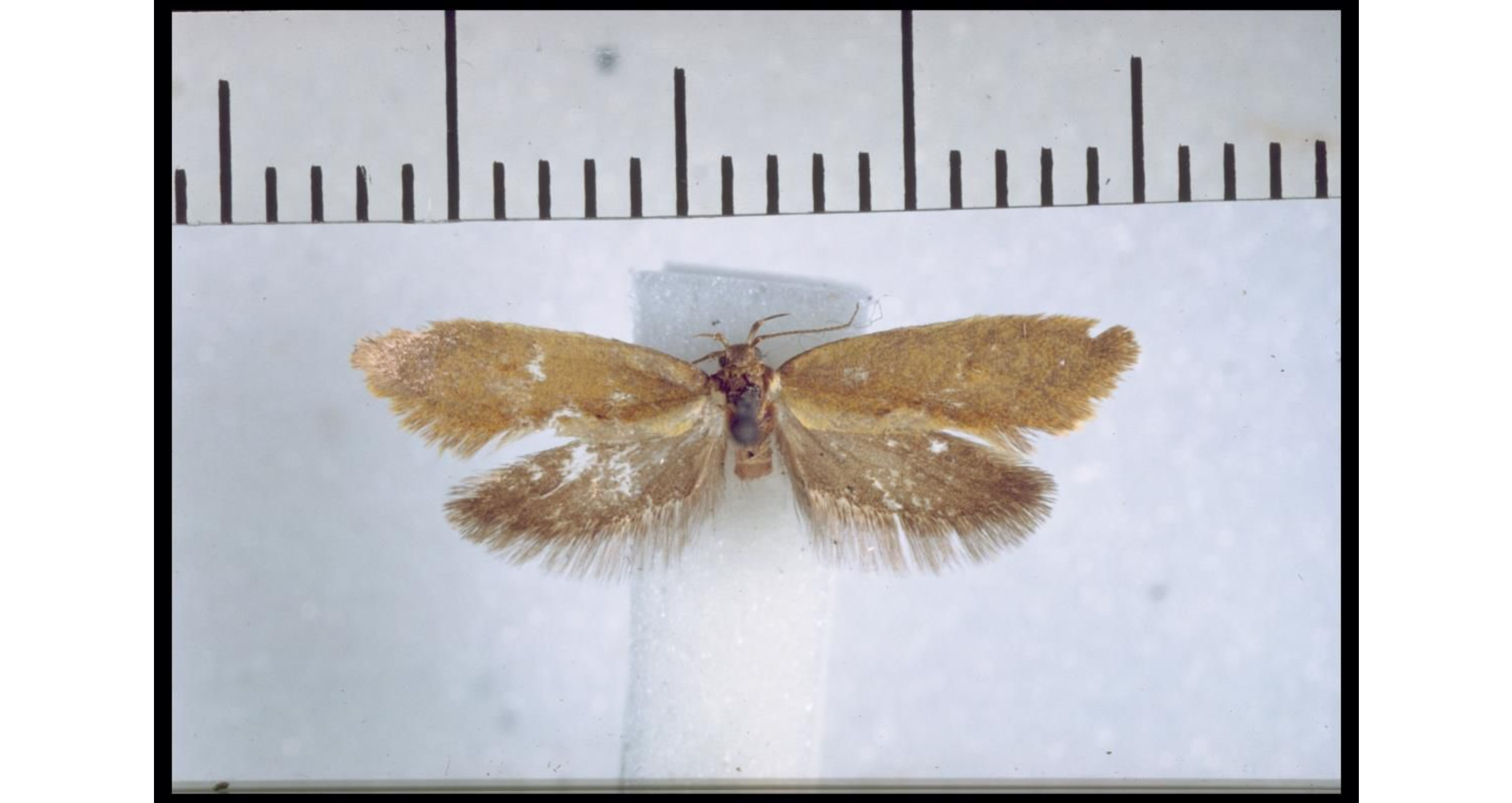
- Male holotype

Scientific classification
- Kingdom: Animalia
- Phylum: Arthropoda
- Class: Insecta
- Order: Lepidoptera
- Family: Oecophoridae
- Genus: Tingena
- Species: T. amiculata

Binomial name
- Tingena amiculata (Philpott, 1926)

Synonyms
- Borkhausenia amiculata Philpott, 1926

= Tingena amiculata =

Species of moth, endemic to New Zealand

Tingena amiculata is a species of moth in the family Oecophoridae. It is endemic to New Zealand and has been observed in the Nelson, Tasman and Canterbury regions. This species has been collected amongst Hebe species and shrubland at altitudes of up to 4500 ft. It is similar in appearance to its near relatives Tingena basella and Tingena laudata.

== Taxonomy ==
This species was first described by Alfred Philpott in 1926 using specimens collected by Philpott at the Cobb Valley and the Mount Arthur tableland in December and named it Borkhausenia amiculata. George Hudson discussed this species under the name B. amiculata in his 1928 publication The butterflies and moths of New Zealand. In 1988 J. S. Dugdale placed this species within the genus Tingena. The male holotype, collected at the Mount Arthur tableland, is held in the New Zealand Arthropod Collection.

== Description ==
Philpott described this species as follows:

♂. 16 ½–17 ½ mm. Head dark brown. Palpi dark brown mixed with yellow. Antennae dark brown annulated with yellow, ciliations in male 1. Thorax dark brown, tegulae and posterior margin tipped with yellow. Abdomen dark coppery-brown. Legs ochreous mixed with brown, tarsi annulated with ochreous. Forewings moderate, costa moderately arched, apex rather pointed, termen slightly rounded, oblique; dull greyish-ochreous tinged with ferruginous; costal edge at base brown for a short distance, thence yellowish to near apex; a stripe of pale yellow from base of dorsum to tornus, apically attenuated; a small ferruginous spot on upper margin of dorsal stripe at ½; a ferruginous discal spot; an indistinct deeply-excurved ferruginous subterminal line, sometimes obsolcte: fringes ochreous mixed with yellow points. Hindwings coppery-fuscous: fringes fuscous with darker basal line.

This species is very similar in appearance to its near relative T. basella but differs as the apex of the forewing of T. amiculata is more pointed. It might also be confused with the species T. laudata however the latter species is smaller with longer ciliations on its antennae and has differences in markings and colour.

== Distribution ==
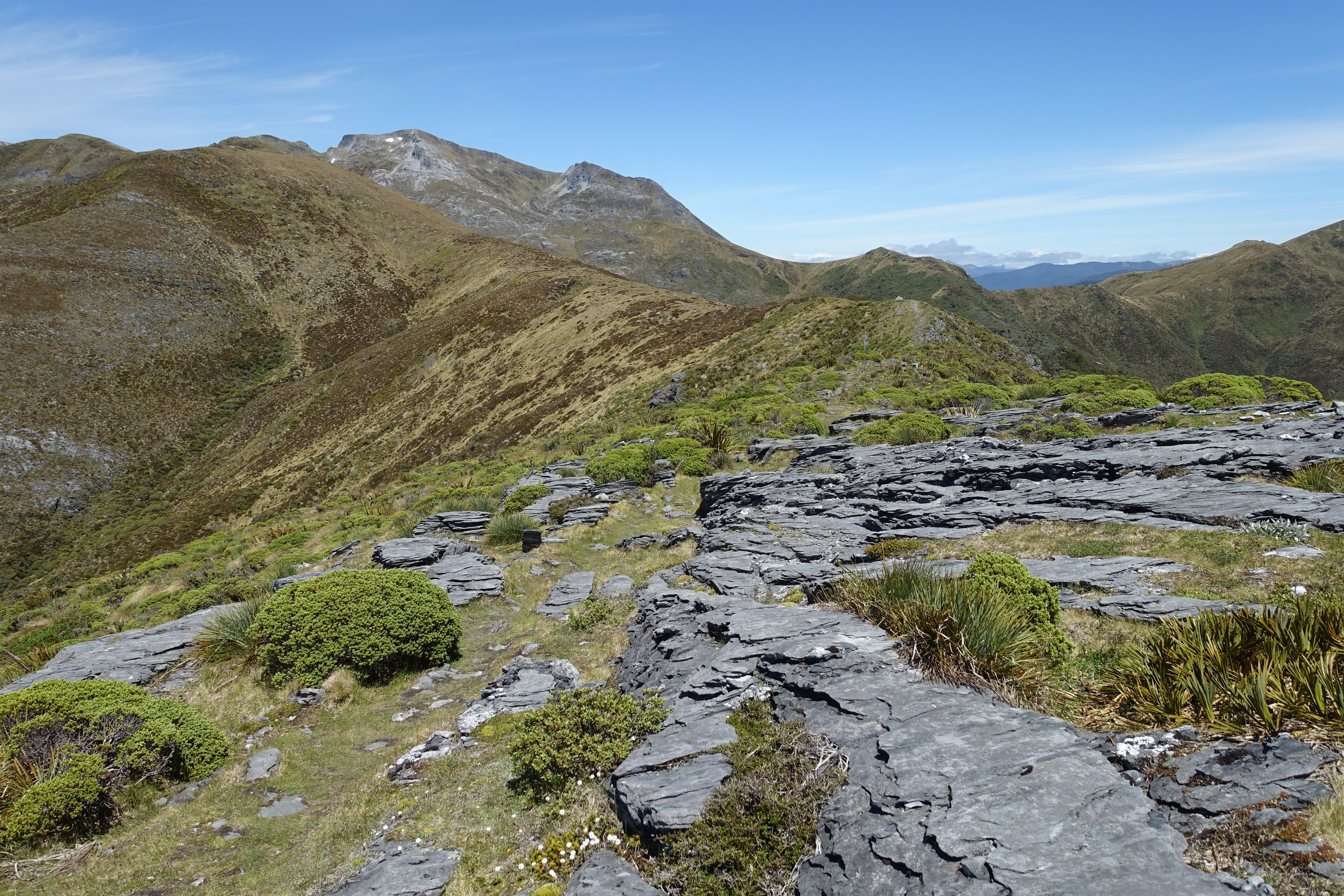
Mount Arthur

This species is endemic to New Zealand. It has been collected in its type location Mount Arthur tableland, Cobb Valley and Arthur's Pass.

== Habitat and hosts ==
This species has been collected amongst Hebe species and shrubland at altitudes of up to 4500 ft.
