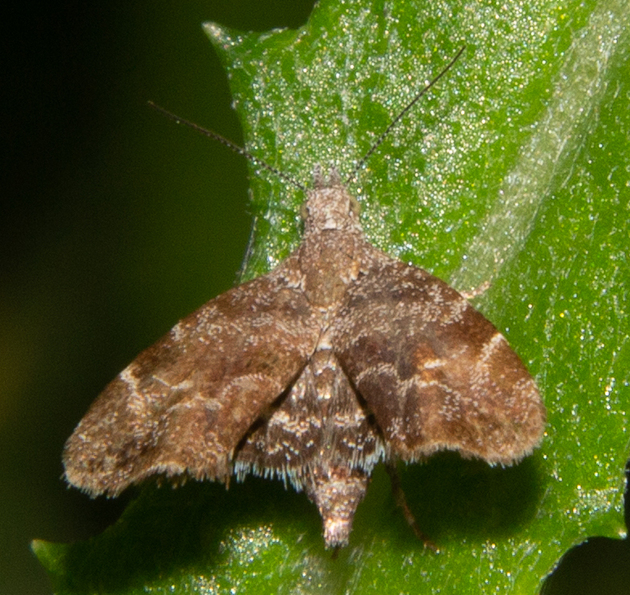

Scientific classification
- Kingdom: Animalia
- Phylum: Arthropoda
- Class: Insecta
- Order: Lepidoptera
- Family: Choreutidae
- Genus: Asterivora
- Species: A. combinatana

Binomial name
- Asterivora combinatana (Walker, 1863)

Synonyms
- Simaethis combinatana Walker, 1863; Simaethis abstitella Walker, 1864; Asterivora abstitella (Walker, 1864); Simaethis zomeuta Meyrick, 1912; Asterivora zomeuta (Meyrick, 1912)

= Asterivora combinatana =

Species of moth

Asterivora combinatana is a species of moth in the family Choreutidae. It is endemic to New Zealand and has been observed at locations in both the North and South Islands. The larvae feed on Senecio bellidioides and Brachyglottis repanda either from within a silken gallery or alternatively a silken curtain under which they feed. It is double brooded with adults being on the wing from September until November and again from February until April. This species is a day flying moth. It is extremely variable both in colouration and in size. The female tends to be larger and paler than the male of the species.

== Taxonomy ==
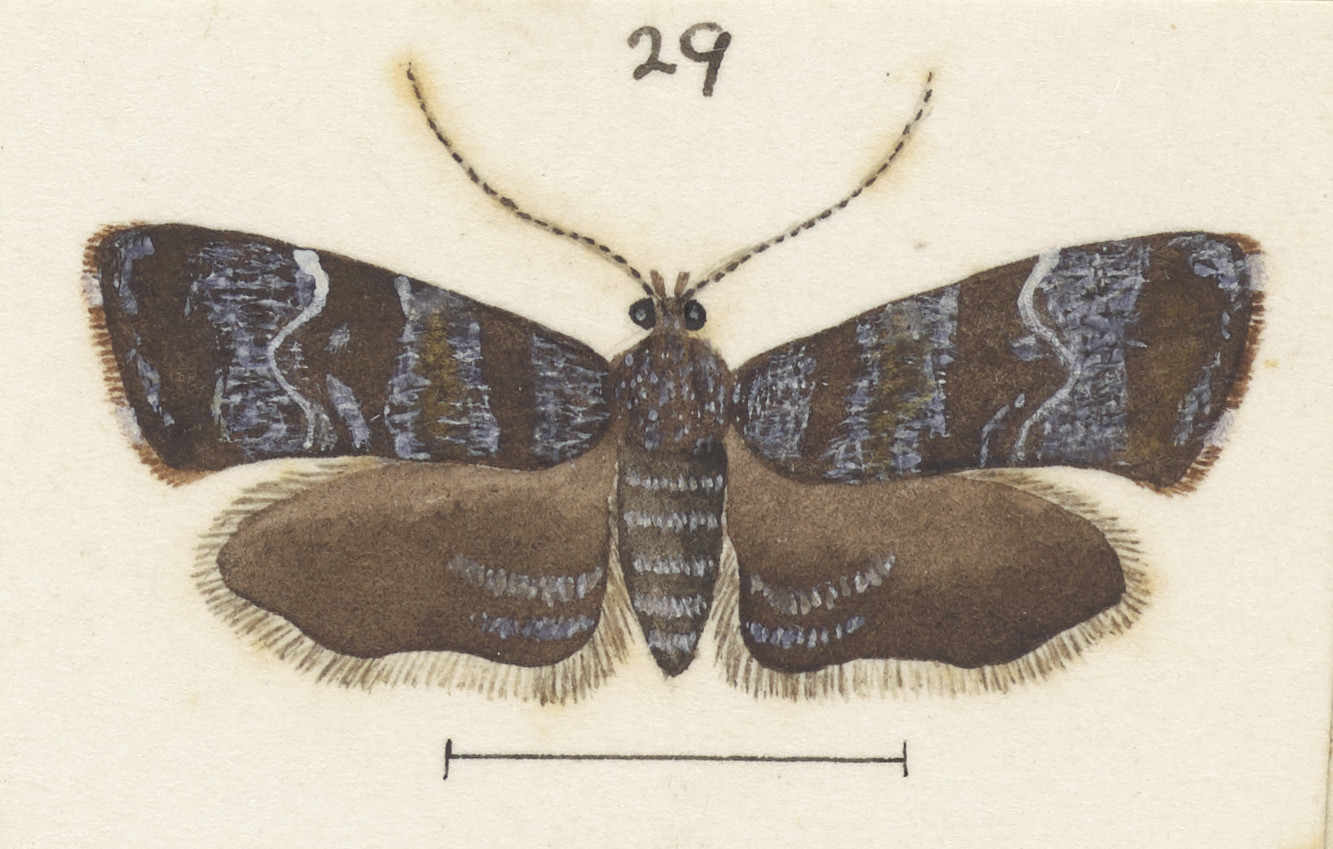
A. combinatana by George Hudson

This species was first described by Francis Walker in 1863 and named Simaethis combinatana. In 1883 Edward Meyrick synonymised Simaethis abstitella with Simaethis combinatana. In 1927 Alfred Philpott studied the male genitalia of this species. In 1928 George Hudson discussed and illustrated this species in his book The butterflies and moths of New Zealand under the name Simaethis combinatana. In that publication Hudson synonymised S. zomeuta with S. combinatana. In 1979 J. S. Dugdale placed S. combinatana within the genus Asterivora. In 1988 Dugdale confirmed this placement. In the 1979 publication Dugdale treated S. zomeuta as a separate species and placed it within the genus Asterivora. However, in his 1988 publication Dugdale synonymised A. zomeuta with A. combinatana. The female lectotype specimen of A. combinatana, collected in Auckland, is held at the Natural History Museum, London.

== Description ==
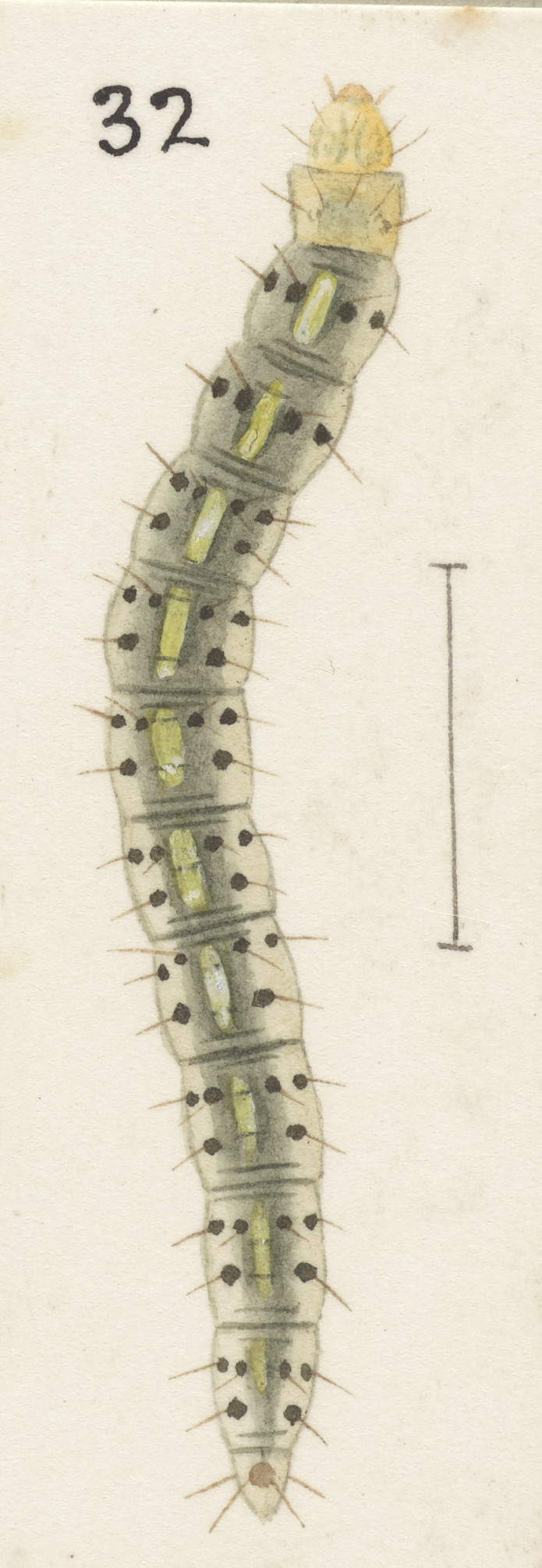
Larva of A. combinatana by George Hudson.

Walker described this species as follows:

Cupreous-ferruginous. Body cinereous beneath. Palpi porrect, squamous, a little longer than the breadth of the head; third joint almost linear, nearly half the length of the second. Antennae with white rings. Fore wings with four whitish transverse diffuse irregular undulating lines; two of these are near the base, and two near the exterior border, and each pair is accompanied by numerous minute whitish speckles; fringe with two whitish streaks. Length of the body lines; of the wings 7 lines.

This species is extremely variable both in colouration and in size. The female tends to be larger and paler than the male of the species. It is very similar in appearance to its sister species Asterivora colpota and is easily confused with the same. Hudson described the larva of this species as follows:

It is somewhat stout, slightly tapering at each end. The head and first segment are pale brown and horny; the rest of the body being pale greenish-ochreous. Each segment is provided with eight black warts arranged in two rows consisting of two and six respectively. Each of these warts gives rise to a small black bristle. The length of the larva when full-grown is about 1 inch.

== Distribution ==
It is endemic to New Zealand. This species has been observed in both the North and South Islands including at Kaeo, Waimarino, Ohakune, Wellington, Mount Arthur and the Ōtira River.

== Behaviour ==
This species is a day flying moth. It is double brooded with adults being on the wing from September until November and again from February until April. Whilst at rest this species places its wings backwards and slightly lifted, with the antennae extended and the hindwings often almost hidden. Hudson described their flying manner as "fussy".

== Life history ==
The larvae feed on Senecio bellidioides and Brachyglottis repanda. When feeding off S. bellidioides they live in a silken gallery, is formed amongst the young shoots of the plant. When feeding on B. repanda they build a silken curtain under which they shelter and feed. Pupation takes place in white silken cocoons amongst the dead shoots of their host plant.
