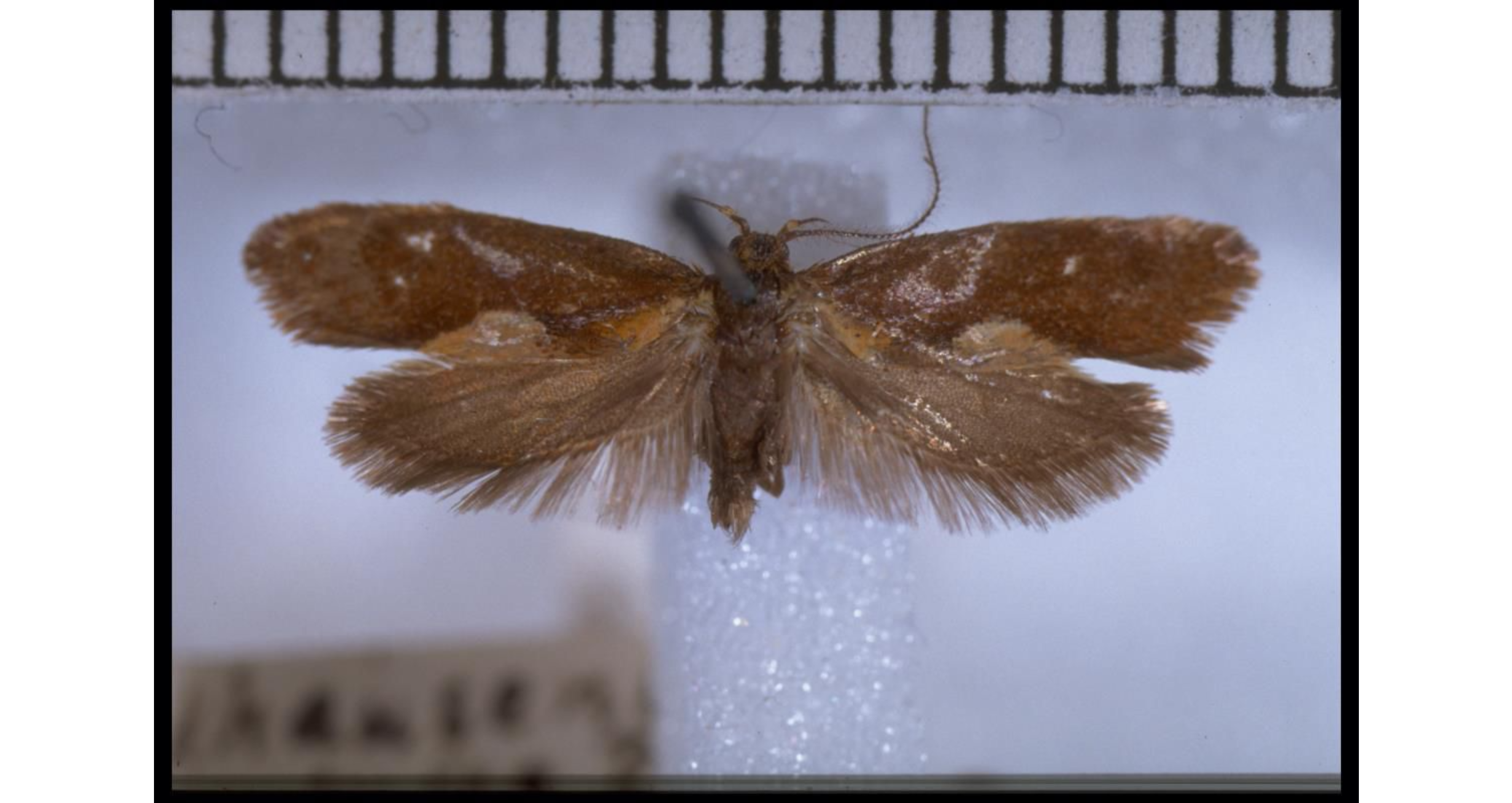
- Male holotype

Scientific classification
- Kingdom: Animalia
- Phylum: Arthropoda
- Class: Insecta
- Order: Lepidoptera
- Family: Oecophoridae
- Genus: Tingena
- Species: T. robiginosa

Binomial name
- Tingena robiginosa (Philpott, 1915)

Synonyms
- Borkhausenia robiginosa Philpott, 1915

= Tingena robiginosa =

Species of moth, endemic to New Zealand

Tingena robiginosa is a species of moth in the family Oecophoridae. It is endemic to New Zealand and has been observed in the southern parts of the South Island. It has been observed in subalpine habitats at altitudes of between 2700 and 3500 ft amongst Hebe and Cassinia species. The adults of this species are on the wing in December and January.

== Taxonomy ==
This species was first described by Alfred Philpott in 1915 using specimens collected in the Longwood Range and the Hunter Mountains, and named Borkhausenia robiginosa. George Hudson discussed and illustrated this species under the name Borkhausenia robiginosa in his 1928 publication The butterflies and moths of New Zealand. Philpott also discussed this species under the name B. robiginosa and illustrated the male genitalia. In 1988 J. S. Dugdale placed this species within the genus Tingena. The male holotype, collected in the Longwood Range, is held in the New Zealand Arthropod Collection.

== Description ==
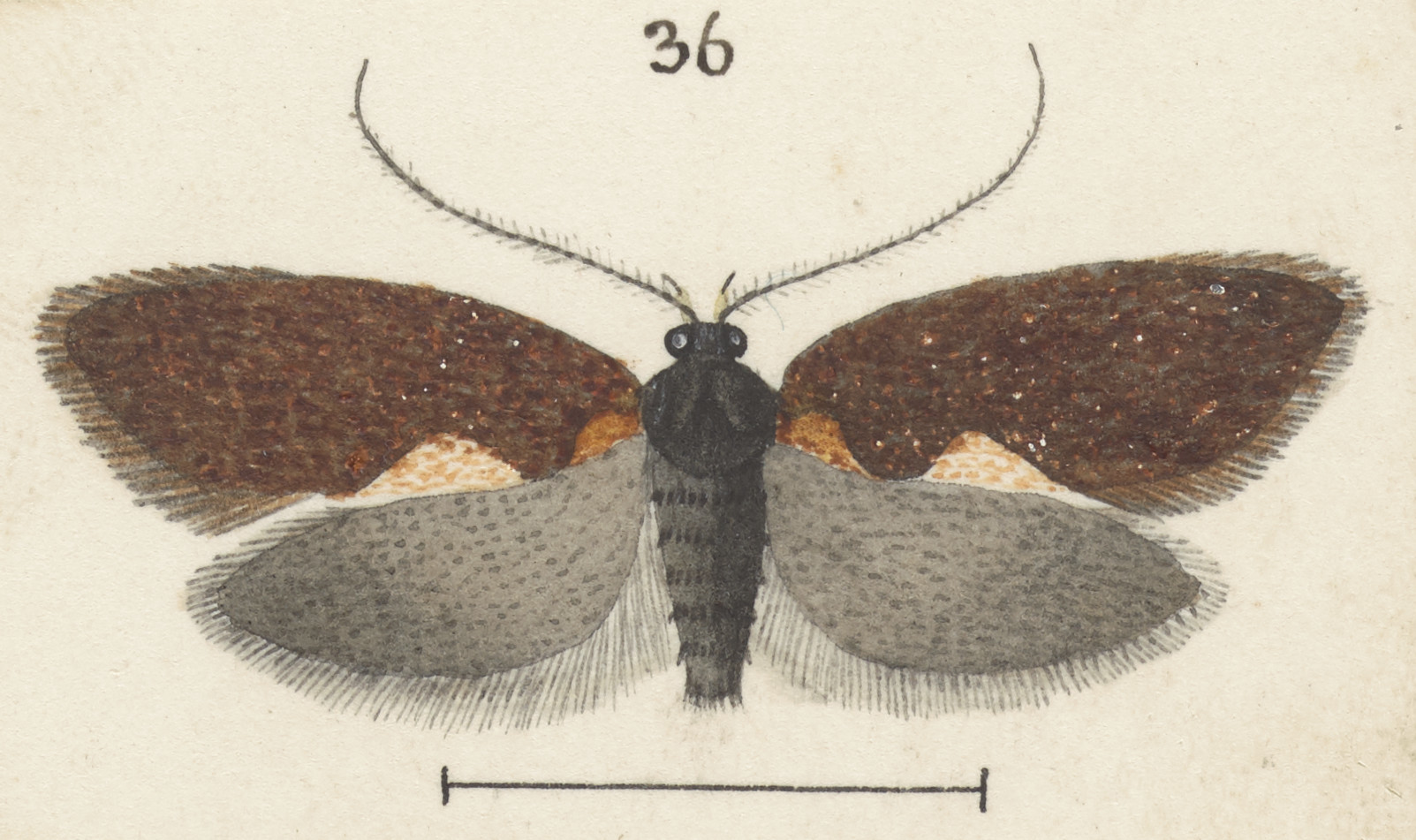
Illustration of T. robiginosa by George Hudson.

Philpott described this species as follows:

♂♀. 18-19 mm. Head, palpi, antennae, thorax, and abdomen dark fuscous : patagiae tipped with whitish or ochreous; antennal ciliations whorled, 3 1/2. Forewings elongate, costa moderately arched, apex rounded, termen slightly rounded, oblique : dark shining ferruginous with some ochreous admixture : a reddish-ochreous patch on dorsum at base; a semi-oval ochreous patch, tinged with reddish and margined with white above, on dorsum at middle : cilia dark ferruginous. Hindwings dark fuscous : cilia dark fuscous with darker basal line. The single ♀ taken has the forewings entirely pale ochreous except that the median dorsal patch is indicated by a broad margin of ferruginous.

This species is similar in appearance to its close relative T. basella but can be distinguished by the differences in the antennae of these species.

== Distribution ==
This species is endemic to New Zealand and has been observed in the Longwood Range, in the Hunter Mountains, in the Otago Lakes area, in Fiordland, and at Arthur's Pass.

== Behaviour ==
The adults of this species are on the wing in December and January.

== Habitat ==
This species has been found in subalpine habitats at altitudes ranging from 2700 ft up to 3,500 ft amongst Hebe and Cassinia species.
