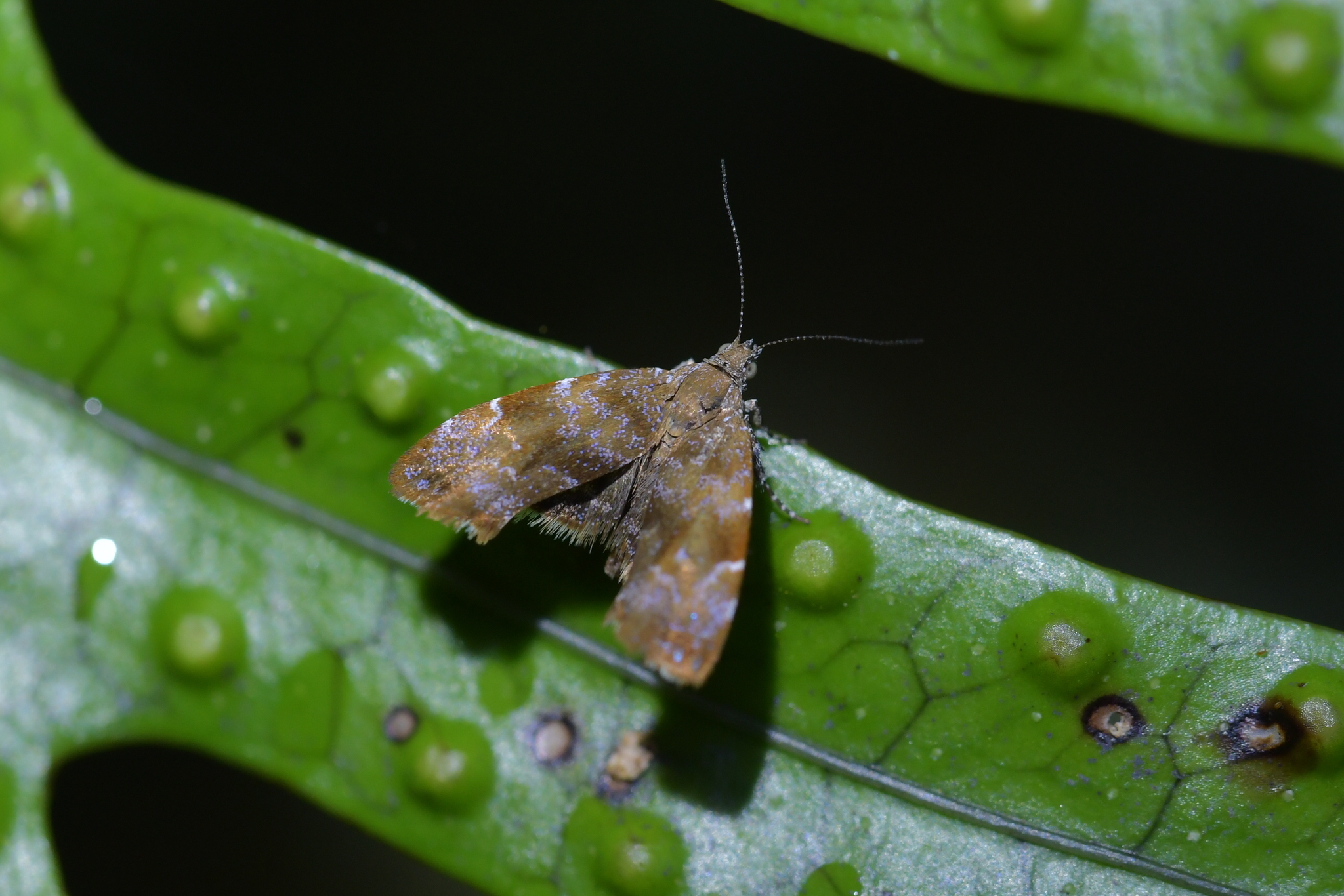

Scientific classification
- Kingdom: Animalia
- Phylum: Arthropoda
- Class: Insecta
- Order: Lepidoptera
- Family: Choreutidae
- Genus: Asterivora
- Species: A. colpota

Binomial name
- Asterivora colpota (Meyrick, 1911)

Synonyms
- Simaethis colpota Meyrick, 1911

= Asterivora colpota =

Species of moth

Asterivora colpota is a moth in the family Choreutidae. It was first described by Edward Meyrick in 1911. It is endemic to New Zealand and is found throughout the North and South Islands. It is regarded as a lowland species and adults are on the wing from November until March. This moth has been collected by beating shrubs.

== Taxonomy ==
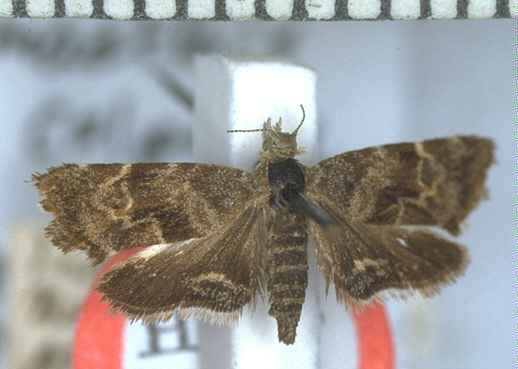
Female holotype specimen of A. colpota.

This species was first described by Edward Meyrick in 1911, using a specimen collected by Alfred Philpott at West Plains in Invercargill, and was named Simaethis colpota. In 1927 Alfred Philpott studied the male genitalia of this species. George Hudson discussed and illustrated this species in his 1928 publication The butterflies and moths of New Zealand. In 1979 J. S. Dugdale placed this species within the genus Asterivora. In 1988 Dugdale confirmed this placement. The holotype female specimen is held at the Natural History Museum, London.

== Description ==
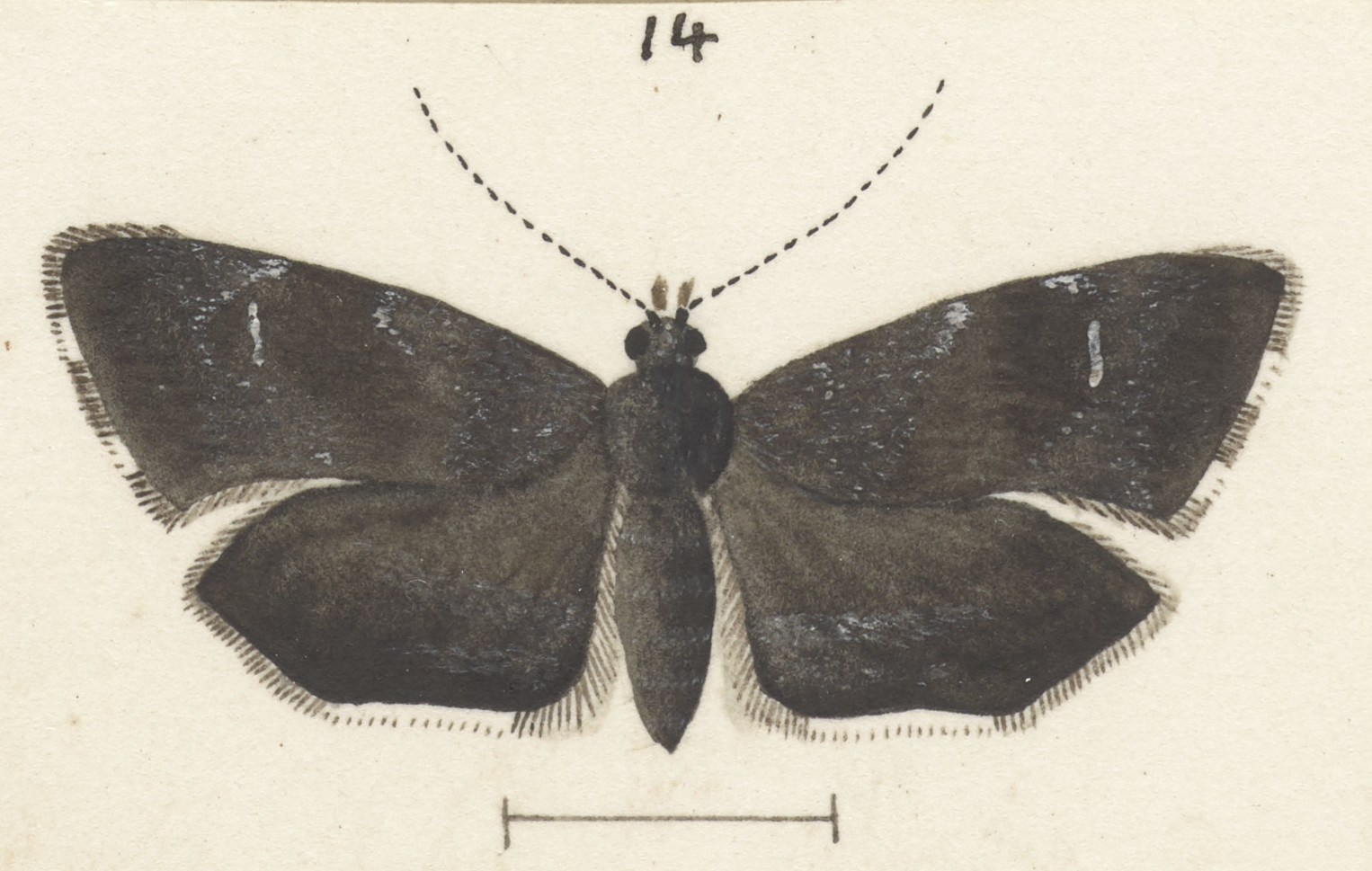
Female A. colpota as illustrated by George Hudson.

Meyrick described this species as follows:

♀. 13mm. Head and thorax dark bronzy-fuscous sprinkled with whitish. Palpi with whorls of dark-fuscous scales tipped with white, second joint with rough projecting scales, whitish towards base beneath. Antennae black ringed with white. Abdomen blackish-fuscous, segmental margins brownish. Forewings elongate, rather dilated posteriorly, costa slightly arched, apex obtuse, termen bowed, rather oblique; dark bronzy-fuscous, basal and terminal areas finely sprinkled with whitish; two parallel rather curved irregular transverse lines of whitish irroration about 2/5; a transverse line of whitish irroration from a white mark on costa at 3/5, its upper 2/3 forming a strong irregular curve outwards, thence right-angled to dorsum at 3/5; its upper 2/3 forming a strong irregular curve outwards, thence right-angled to dorsum at 3/5; a transverse linear mark of whitish irroration terminated beneath by a white dot lying within this curve and almost touching it at both ends; a thick subterminal shade of whitish irroration, somewhat interrupted above middle: cilia dark fuscous with some whitish points, beneath apex and above tornus with some whitish points, beneath apex and above tornus with white apical patches. Hindwings dark grey, terminal half blackish; two parallel lines of whitish irroration towards termen on lower half, posterior less marked: cilia dark fuscous with blackish subbasal shade, beyond this suffused with whitish on lower half of termen.

Meyrick stated that this species was similar in appearance to Asterivora combinatana but that it could be distinguished from it via the discal mark as well as the second line on the forewings.

== Distribution ==
This species is endemic to New Zealand and can be found throughout the North and South Islands.

== Habitat ==
This species is regarded as living in lowland habitat.

== Behaviour ==
This species is on the wing from November until March. This moth has been collected by beating shrubs.
