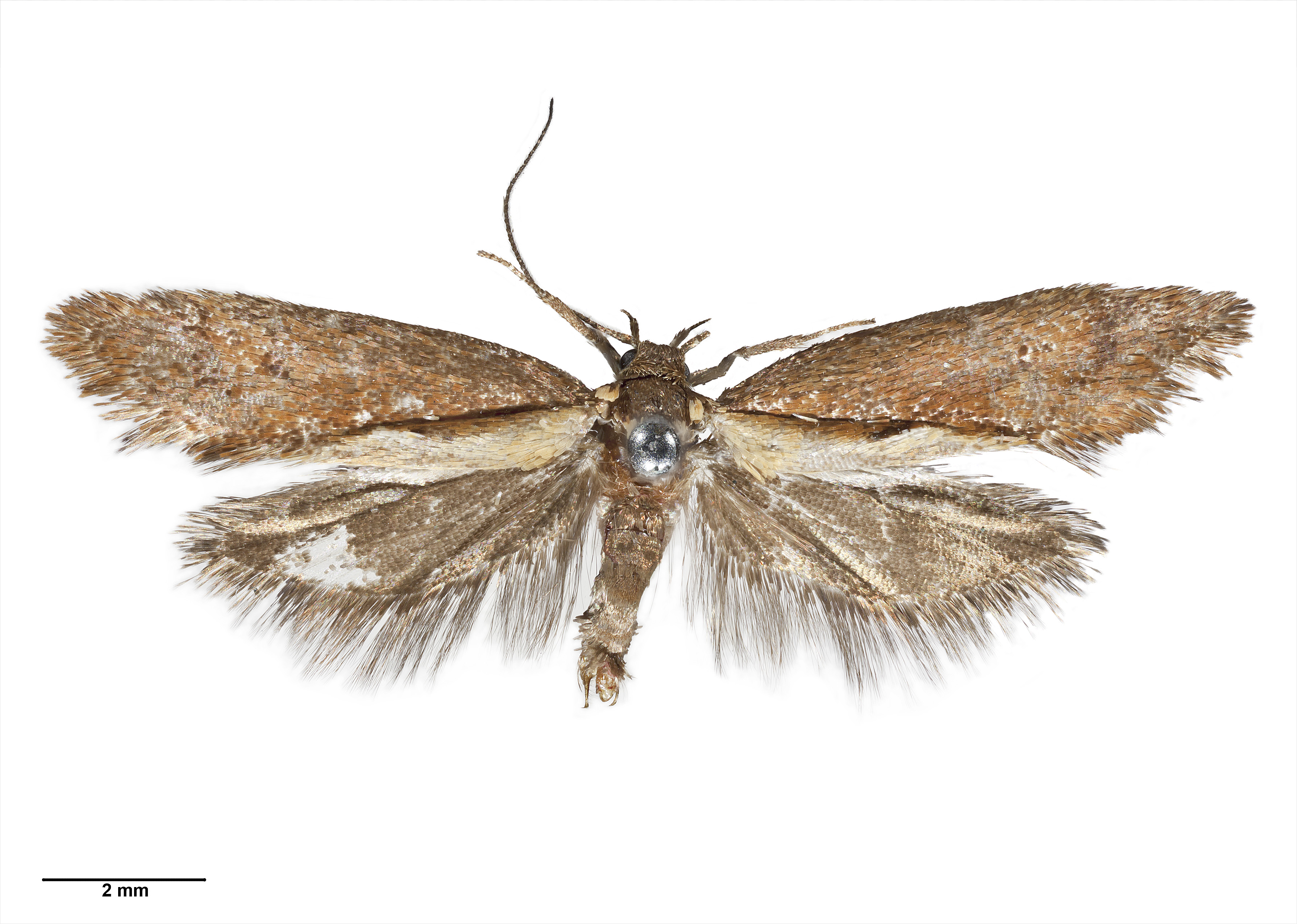
- Male holotype

Scientific classification
- Kingdom: Animalia
- Phylum: Arthropoda
- Class: Insecta
- Order: Lepidoptera
- Family: Oecophoridae
- Genus: Tingena
- Species: T. laudata

Binomial name
- Tingena laudata (Philpott, 1930)

Synonyms
- Borkhausenia laudata Philpott, 1930

= Tingena laudata =

Species of moth, endemic to New Zealand

Tingena laudata is a species of moth in the family Oecophoridae. It is endemic to New Zealand and has been observed in Fiordland and Otago. Adults of this species are on the wing in January.

== Taxonomy ==
This species was first described by Alfred Philpott using specimens collected by Charles Edwin Clarke at Bluecliff in Fiordland and Waitati in January and named Borkhausenia laudata. In 1939 George Hudson discussed and illustrated this species under the name B. laudata. In 1988 J. S. Dugdale placed this species in the genus Tingena. The male holotype specimen, collected at Bluecliff, is held at the Auckland War Memorial Museum.

== Description ==
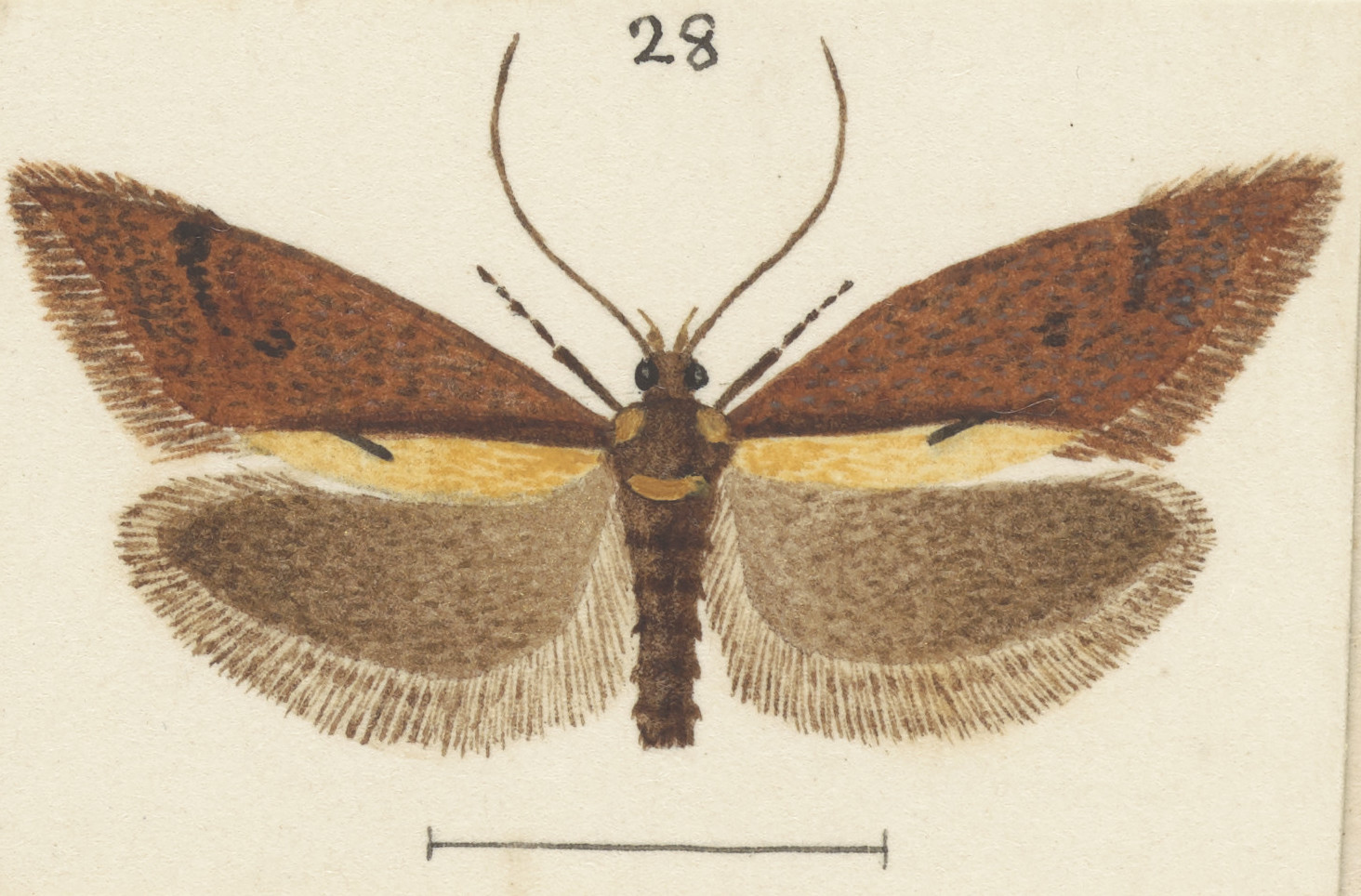
Illustration of T. laudata by George Hudson.

Philpott described this species as follows:

♂ . 13-15 mm. Head and palpi purplish brown. Antennae dark brown, minutely spotted with ochreous, ciliations in ♂ 2 1/2. Thorax purplish brown, apex and tips of tegulae yellow. Abdomen purplish brown. Legs fuscous, tarsi very obscurely annulated with ochreous. Forewings elongate, costa moderately arched, apex round-pointed, termen straight, oblique; bright ferruginous; beneath fold rather bright ochreous; a blackish spot below fold at 1/2 margined anteriorly with ferruginous and posteriorly with ochreous white: fringes ferruginous. Hindwings purplish, fuscous: fringes fuscous with darker basal line.

This species is similar in appearance to T. amiculata but is smaller in size and has longer antennal ciliations. The markings and colouration of the forewings is also different.

== Distribution ==
This species is endemic to New Zealand and has been observed in Fiordland and Otago.

== Behaviour ==
Adults of this species are on the wing in January.
