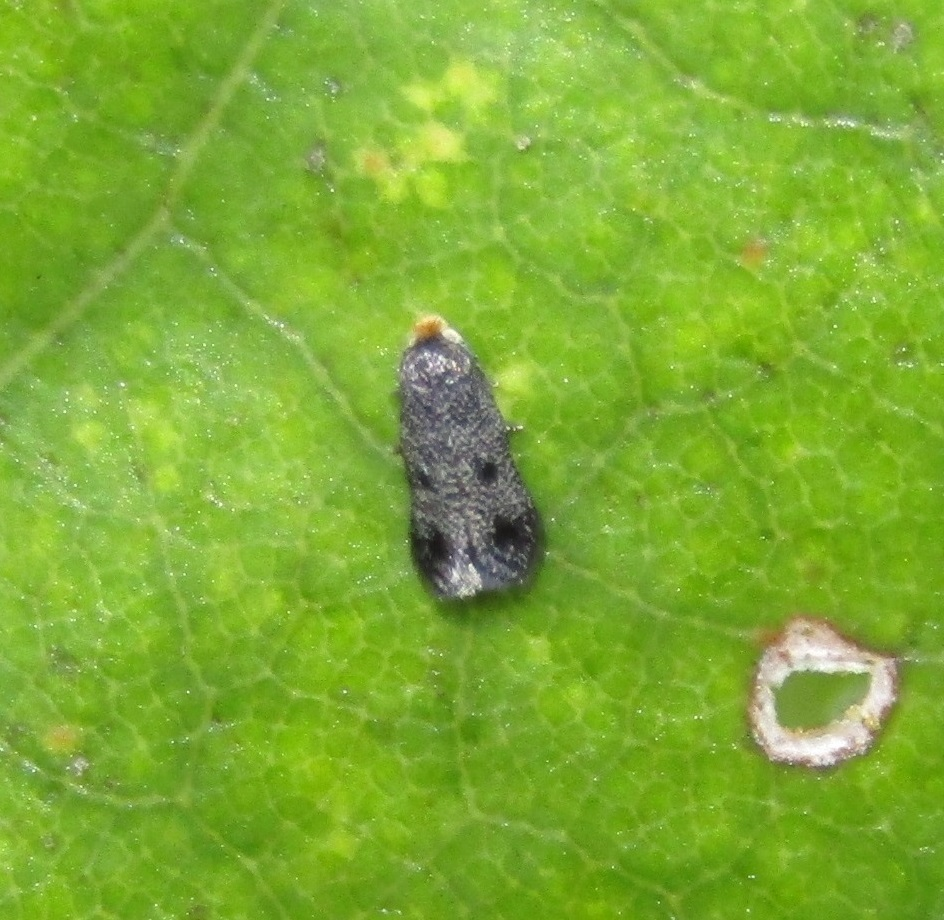

Scientific classification
- Kingdom: Animalia
- Phylum: Arthropoda
- Clade: Pancrustacea
- Class: Insecta
- Order: Lepidoptera
- Family: Nepticulidae
- Genus: Stigmella
- Species: S. cypracma

Binomial name
- Stigmella cypracma (Meyrick, 1916)

Synonyms
- Nepticula cypracma Meyrick, 1916; Nepticula perissopa Meyrick, 1919

= Stigmella cypracma =

Species of moth endemic to New Zealand

Stigmella cypracma is a species of moth of the family Nepticulidae. It is endemic to New Zealand and has been observed in the North and South Islands. The larvae of this species are leaf miners and pupate within their mines. The larval host species is Brachyglottis repanda. Adult moths are on the wing in February and September to November. This species has two generations per year.

== Taxonomy ==
This species was first described by Edward Meyrick in 1916 using a female specimen collected by George Hudson in November in Karori and named Nepticula cypracma. In 1919 Meyrick, thinking he was describing a new species, also named it Nepticula perissopa. For this he used a specimen collected by Hudson at Mount Taranaki. In 1921 Morris N. Watt described this moth and its lifecycle in detail under the name Nepticula perissopa. In 1928 Hudson described and illustrated the species under the name Nepticula cypracma and also describing it under the name Nepticula perissopa. However he expresses doubt at the distinction between the two species. In 1988 J. S. Dugdale places both these species within the genus Stigmella. In 1989 Hans Donner and Christopher Wilkinson synonymised Stigmella perissopa with Stigmella cypracma. The holotype specimen is held at the Natural History Museum, London.

== Description ==
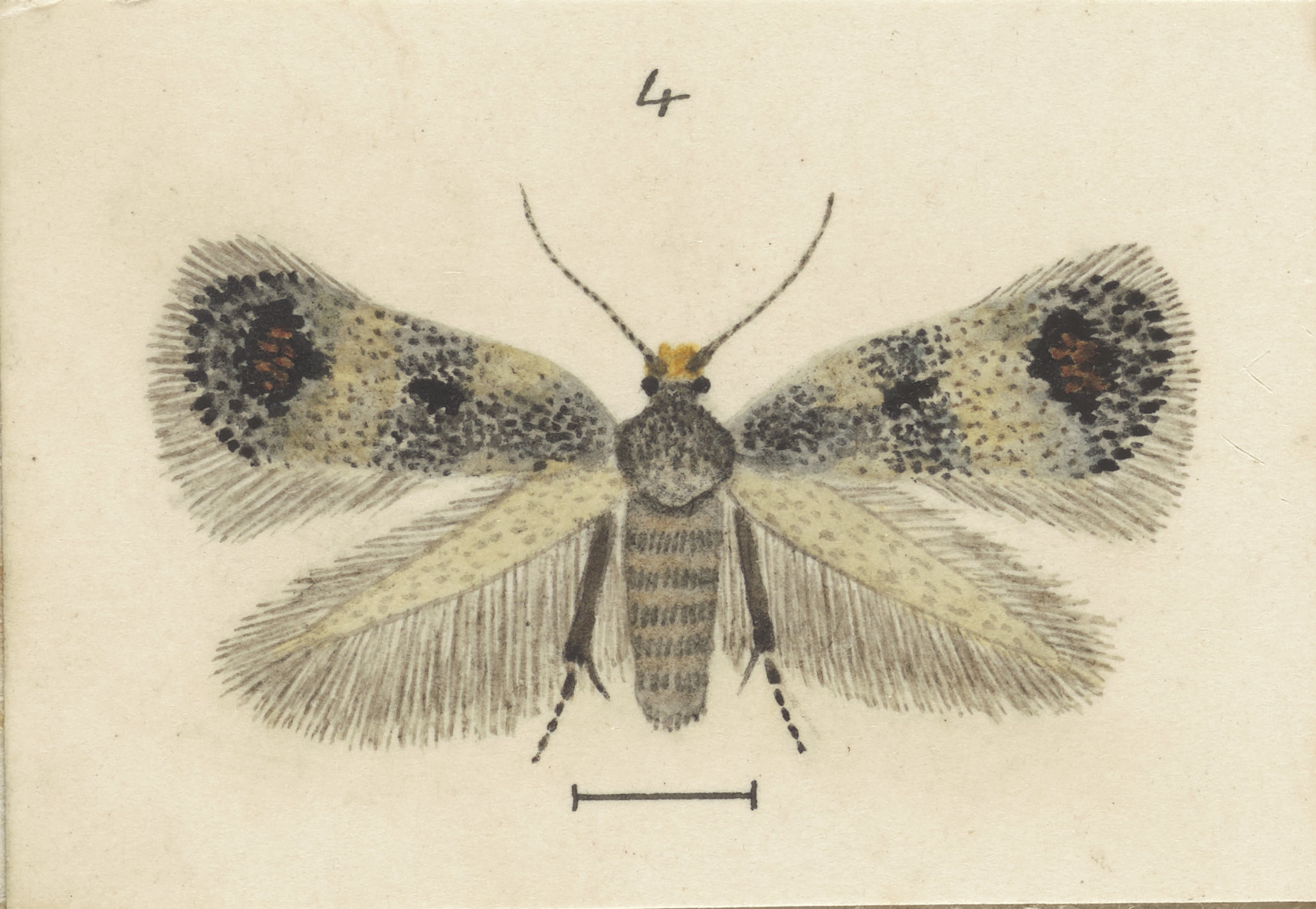
Illustration by G. Hudson.

Watt described the empty egg shell of this species as being white and shiny. It is wafer-like, oval, slightly broader at the anterior end, and domed above. Watt also described the larva of this species. He stated:

When young the larva is white in colour, flattened, moniliform; alimentary canal greyish-brown. In the fully-fed larva the body is cylindrical, only very slightly flattened dorso-ventrally; length about 5mm.; head flattened, retractile, rounded, in the younger larvae bluntly triangular; segments well rounded but not deeply incised, the mesothorax has the greatest diameter, the metathorax and first seven abdominal segments being about equal, segments 8 to 10 acutely attenuated; there is a deep constriction between 8 and 9; 9 is very small. Ground-colour palest green, almost white; central marking fairly broad, light yellow from the head to the eighth abdominal segment; head pale yellowish-brown, sutures and mouth-parts reddish and darker. [...] Surface of body covered with a very minute pile. Setae inconspicuous; main setae about half as long as their respective segments.

The cocoon is oval in shape, broader at its anterior end, 4.5 mm by 2 mm, flattened top and bottom 1mm. The silk on the outside is pale-vellowish and compact, and within this is an inner cocoon of white silk which also has its prepared anterior outlet.

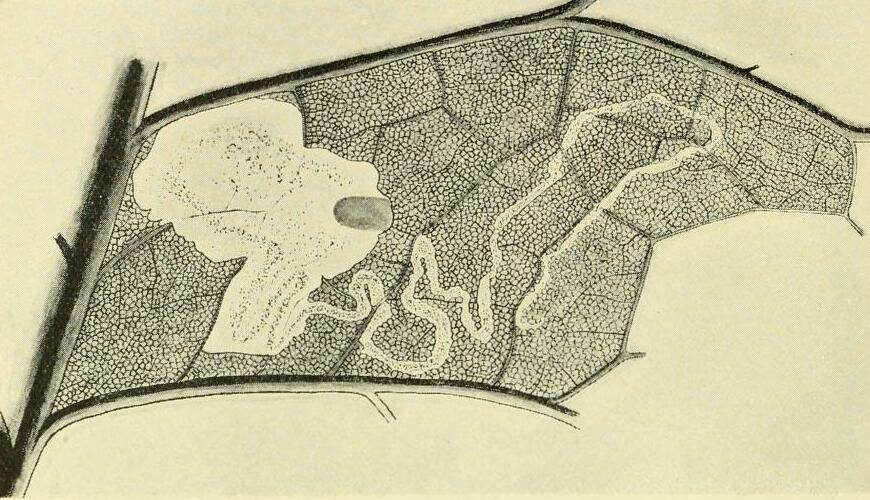
Leaf of B repanda showing mine, resulting blotch and cocoon of S. cypracma.

Meyrick originally described the adult moth of the species as follows:

♀︎. 7 mm. Head whitish-yellowish, collar grey-whitish. Antennal eye-caps whitish. Thorax dark grey. Abdomen grey. Forewings lanceolate; prismatic grey-whitish, irregularly sprinkled with dark grey; basal fourth dark purple-grey; a deep coppery-bronze apical spot mixed with blackish : cilia violet-grey sprinkled with black. Hindwings and cilia grey.

Watt described the adult female moth as follows:

Female 6 - 8 mm. Head light yellowish-brown; base of antennae whitish, antennae about 1/2, dark grey. Thorax and abdomen dark grey to black. Forewings broad, ground-colour whitish with a pale violet reflection in a bright light, irrotated with black scales; at about 2/3 the whitish scales predominate slightly so as to form a fairly broad and sometimes quite distinct pale transverse bar across wing; the black scales predominate in the terminal 1/4 of the wing, and near the apex surround a distinct round spot, black in some lights, golden-brown in others; a similar but smaller spot in centre of wing a little beyond 1/2, the light transverse bar before mentioned separating the one from the other. In some specimens there may be slight evidence of a second light transverse bar across wing to the inner side of the central spot. A black cilial line; cilia dark grey with violet and reddish reflections.

Watt described the adult male as follows:

In the male the black scales greatly predominate, and there is little or no evidence of light transverse bars. The central spot is sometimes missing.

S. cypracma can be distinguished from similar species S. ogygia and S. hakekeae as it has wings that are broader and more evenly coloured. However adults of this species are very similar in appearance to S. atrata.

== Distribution ==
This species is endemic to New Zealand. Other than the type locality of Wellington, this species or its mines have been collected from Northland, Bay of Plenty, Taranaki, Whanganui, and Havelock. Watt regarded this species as being common in the Wellington Botanic Garden.

== Life cycle ==
Eggs of this species are laid singly and normally with only one or two eggs on the upper side of the leaf. The egg is firmly cemented to the leaf, and persists at the commencement of the mine for many weeks filled with frass. Once hatched the larvae mine the leaf and create a long narrow gallery terminating in an expanded blotch, and is constructed immediately beneath the upper cuticle of the leaf. Its general direction is, as a rule, from within towards the margin of the leaf. The larva mines dorsum uppermost. Frass is plentiful, finely granular, black, and in the gallery is deposited in the central three-fourths of the mine. The last act of the larva is to prepare an outlet at the margin of the blotch, and just within this it constructs its cocoon. The cocoon is constructed within the blotch close against its outer margin. The pupal duration lasts about fifteen days. When the imago is ready to emerge the pupa is thrust out the anterior end of the cocoon and through the slit in the under-cuticle, the anal segments being retained within the cocoon. Emergence takes place on the under-surface of the leaf.

== Biology and behaviour ==
Larvae have been recorded from May to October and in December. They mine the leaves of their host plant. This makes S. cypracma one of only two species within New Zealand that pupate within their mine. Cocoons with live pupae have been found in May, June, August, September and December.

Adults have been recorded on the wing in February and from September to November. There are two generations per year.

== Habitat and host species ==
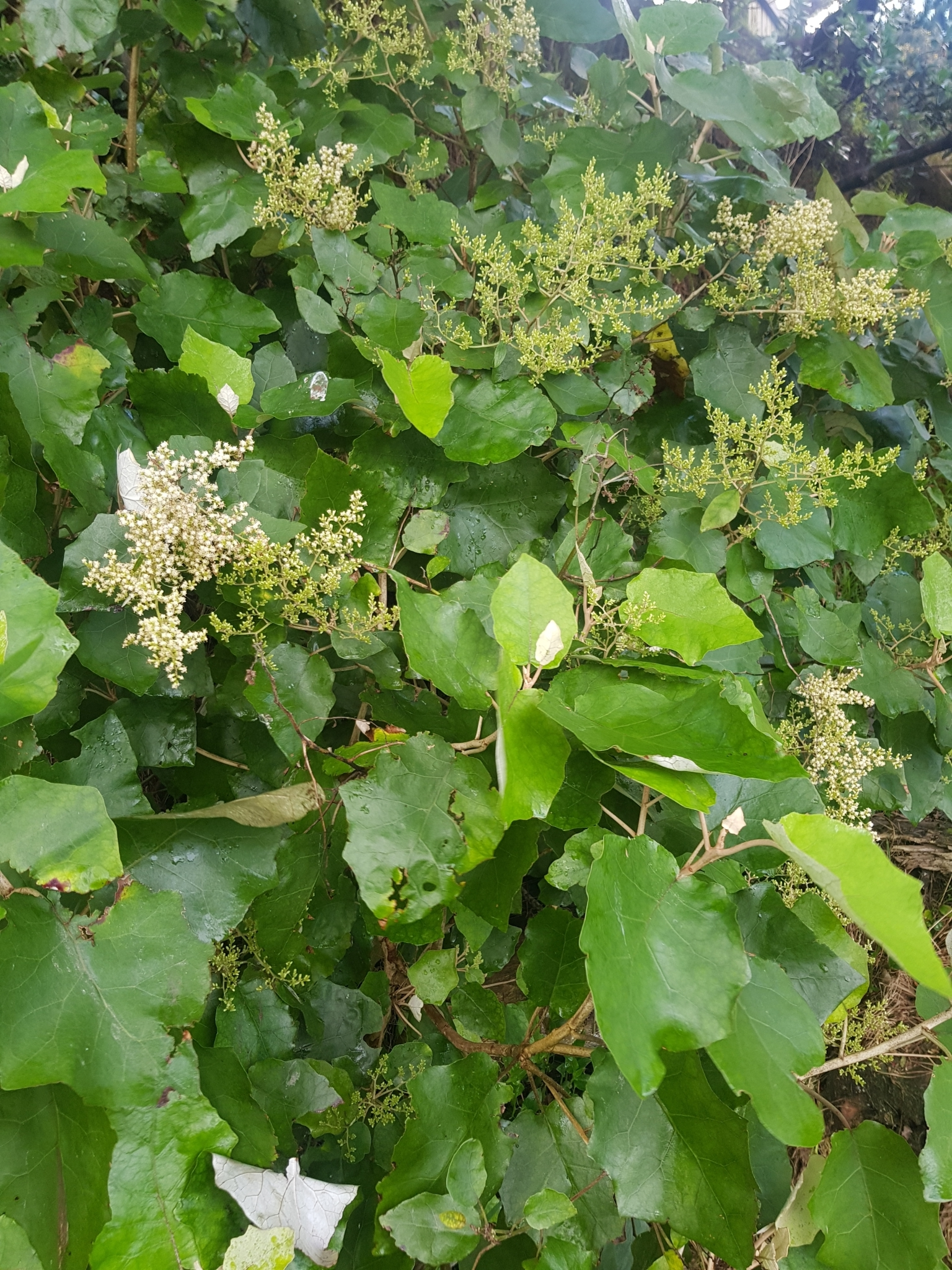
Brachyglottis repanda

The larvae feed on Brachyglottis repanda. As such this moth species inhabits the same habitat as its host plant; coastal, lowland and lower montane shrubland and open forest.

== Threats ==
The larvae of this moth is frequently preyed upon by minute hymenopterous parasites.
