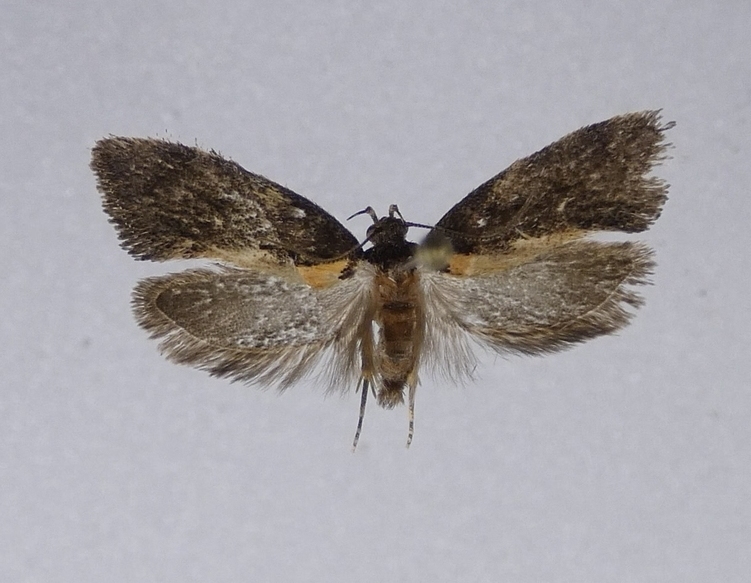

Scientific classification
- Kingdom: Animalia
- Phylum: Arthropoda
- Clade: Pancrustacea
- Class: Insecta
- Order: Lepidoptera
- Family: Oecophoridae
- Genus: Tingena
- Species: T. basella

Binomial name
- Tingena basella (Walker, 1863)

Synonyms
- Incurvaria basella Walker, 1863; Borkhausenia basella (Walker, 1863); Oecophora ademptella Walker, 1864

= Tingena basella =

Species of moth, endemic to New Zealand

Tingena basella is a species of moth in the family Oecophoridae. It is endemic to New Zealand and has been found in both the North and South Islands. The preferred habitat of this species is scrubland or light forest. Eggs are deposited either singly or in egg masses. The larvae are littler leaf feeders. The adults of this species are on the wing from October through to the middle of December. George Hudson stated that he had collected numerous specimens of both sexes amongst the flowers of Brachyglotis repanda.

== Taxonomy ==
Francis Walker described this species in 1863 using specimens collected by D. Bolton in Auckland and named the species Incurvaria basella. In 1915 Edward Meyrick placed this species in the genus Borkhausenia and synonymised Oecophora ademptella with this species. George Hudson discussed and illustrated this species under the name Borkhausenia basella in his 1928 publication The butterflies and moths of New Zealand. In 1988 J. S. Dugdale placed this species within the genus Tingena. The male holotype specimen is held in the Natural History Museum, London.

== Description ==
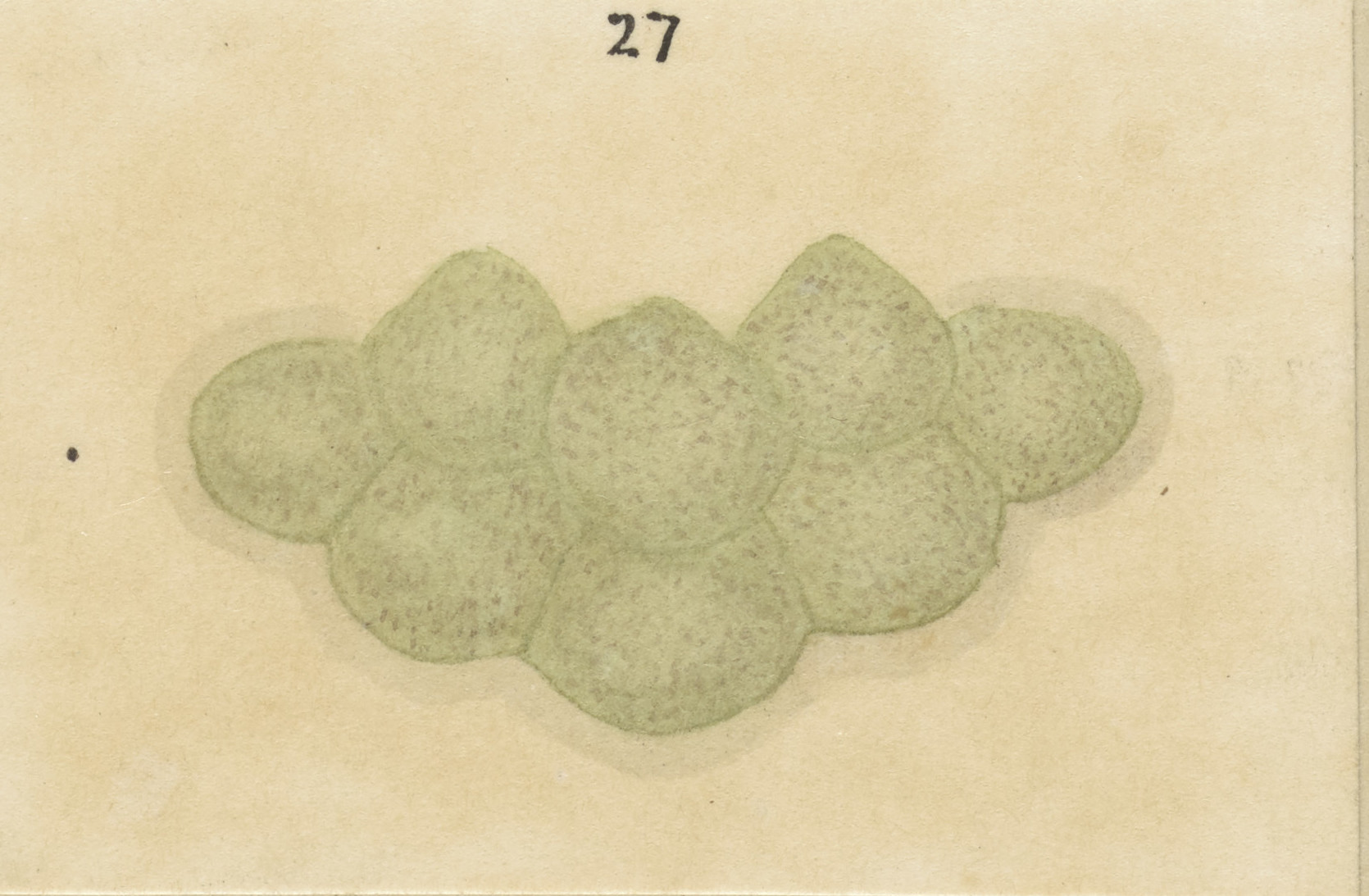
Eggs of T. basella.

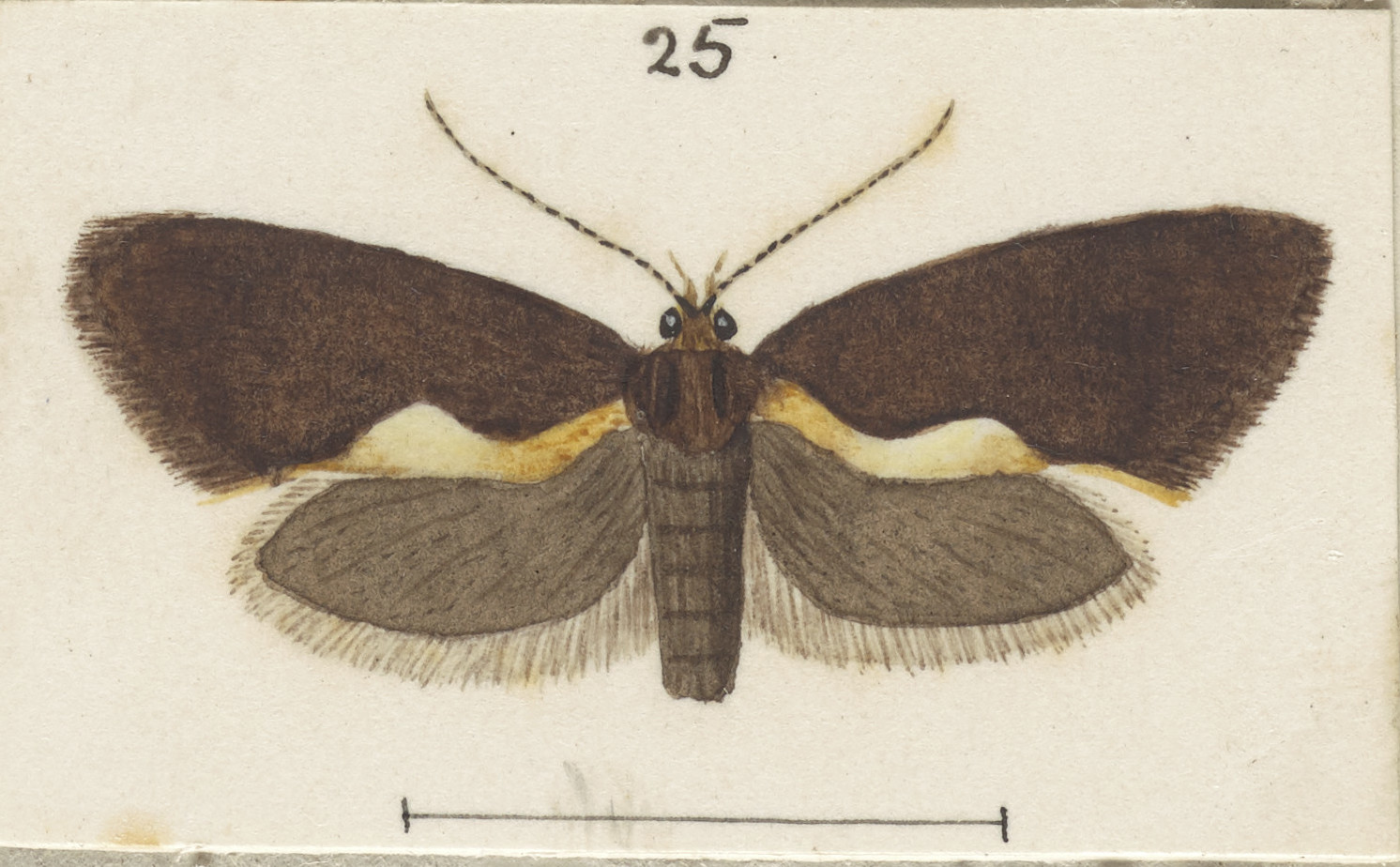
Adult male T. basella.

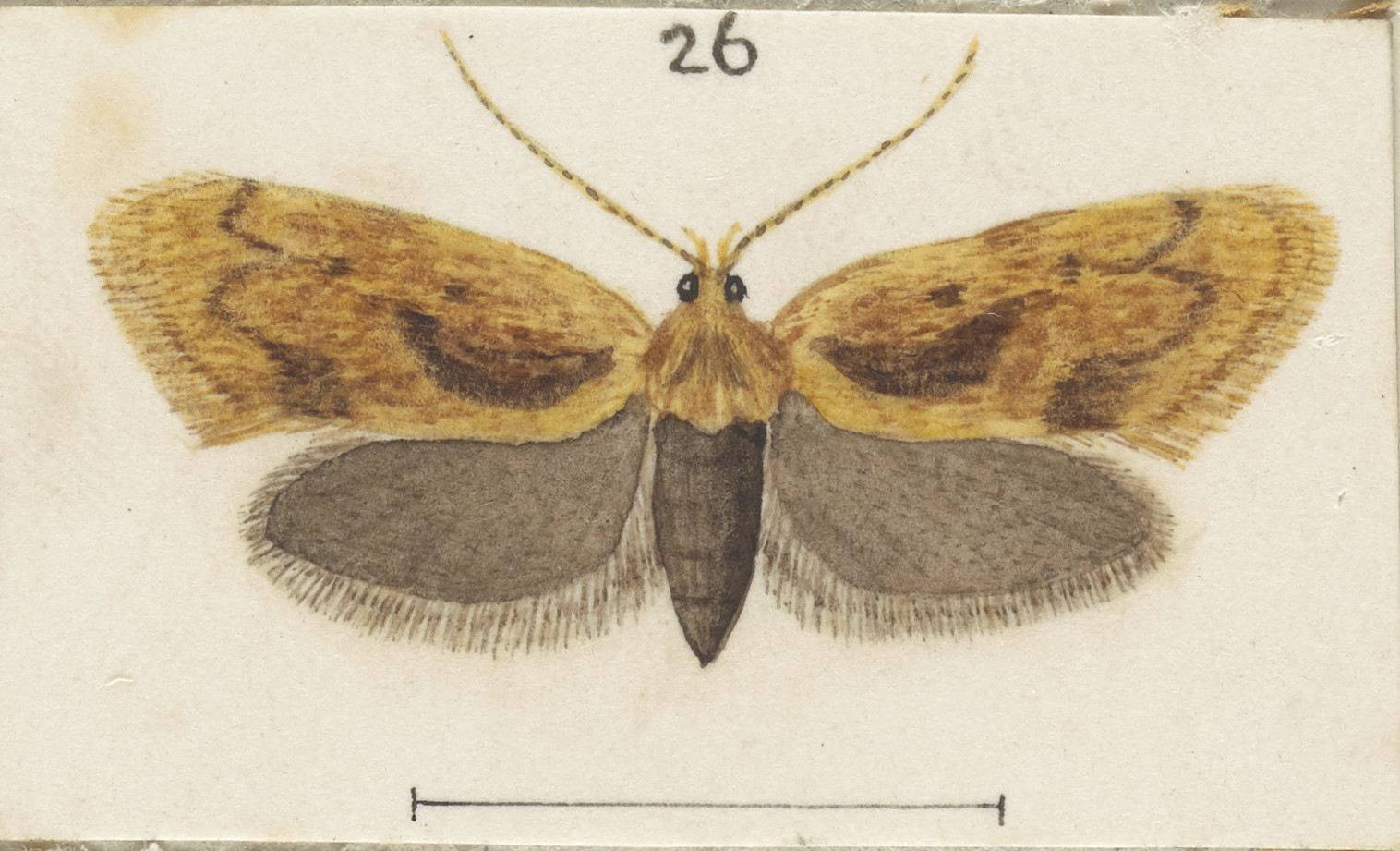
Adult female T. basella.

The eggs of this species can be deposited either singly or alternatively in egg masses. Hudson described the eggs as follows:

sub-cylindrical, much flattened, often partially collapsed, with rows of extremely indistinct hexagonal depressions; dull white with faint iridescent reflections.

Walker described the adult male of the species as follows:

Male. Cupreous-brown. Antennae minutely pubescent, less than half the length of the fore wings. Fore wings rounded at the tips, with a short broad pale yellow streak along the basal part of the interior border; exterior border very oblique. Length of the body 4 lines; of the wings 12 lines.

In comparison to its close relatives this species is larger and is variable in appearance. The male of the species sometimes has forewings that are greyish brown or alternatively can be coloured a warm brown with tinges of yellow. The hindwings are also variable in appearance with the depth of grey varying. The female of the species has brown mottled forewings thought the depth of this mottling can vary and in some cases may be almost absent.

== Distribution ==
This species is endemic to New Zealand and has been observed in the Coromandel, Kaitoke, Wellington, Ōtira River, Christchurch, Blue Cliff, and Invercargill.

== Behaviour ==
The adults of this species are on the wing from October through to the middle of December. The wings of this species are easily worn. This species drops to the ground when disturbed and can be difficult to locate as a result of its colouring. The male, when it does fly, is made inconspicuous as a result of its dark colouring. The adult female of the species is a reluctant flyer. Hudson has stated that he had collected numerous specimens of both sexes amongst the flowers of Brachyglotis repanda.

== Habitat and hosts ==
This species inhabits scrubland and light forest habitat. The larvae of this species are litter leaf feeders.
