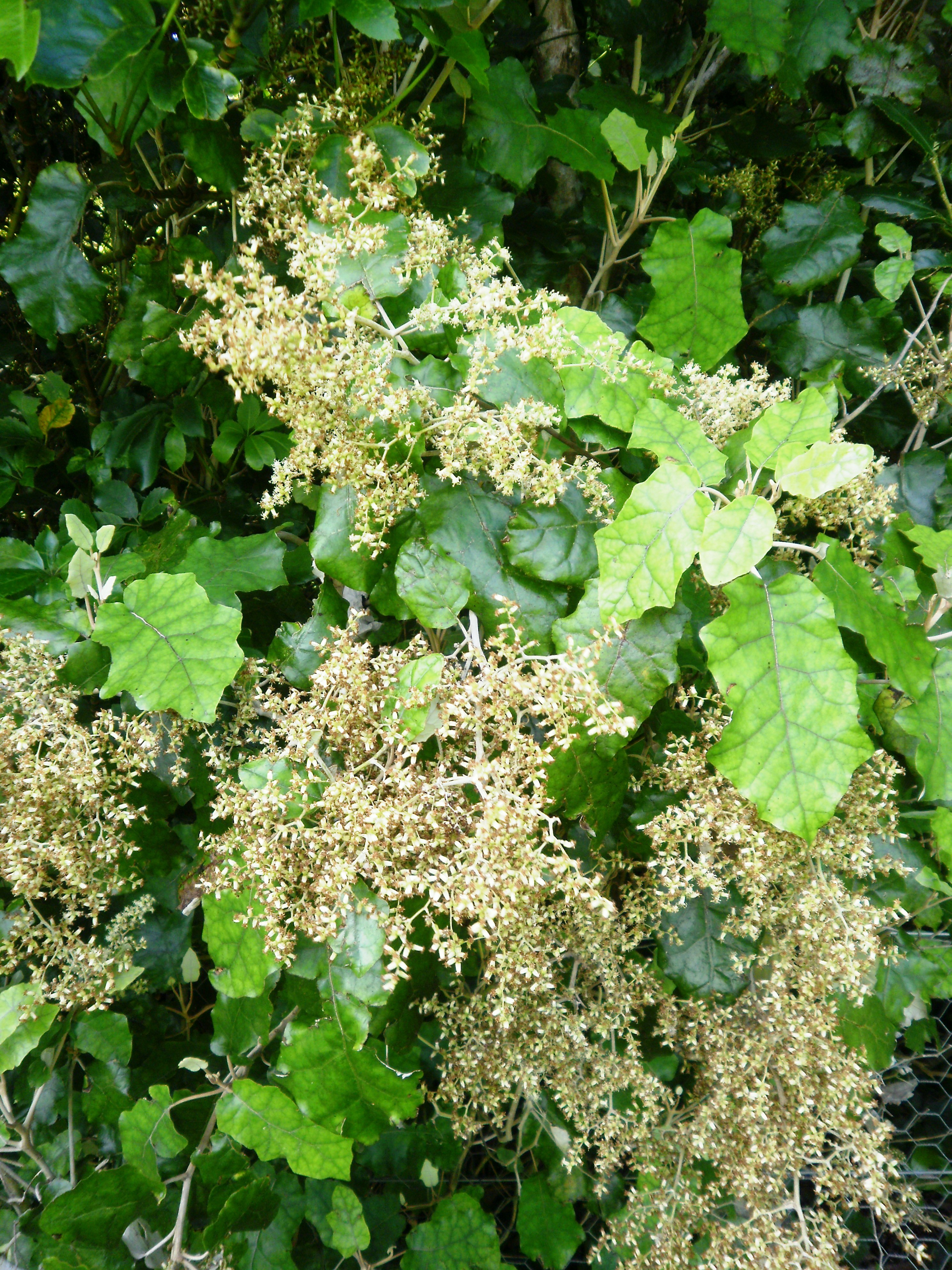

Scientific classification
- Kingdom: Plantae
- Clade: Tracheophytes
- Clade: Angiosperms
- Clade: Eudicots
- Clade: Asterids
- Order: Asterales
- Family: Asteraceae
- Genus: Brachyglottis
- Species: B. repanda

Binomial name
- Brachyglottis repanda J.R.Forster & G.Forster

= Brachyglottis repanda =

Rangiora

Species of tree

Brachyglottis repanda, the rangiora or bushman's friend, is a small, bushy tree or tall shrub endemic to New Zealand. It grows to a height of 5 to 7 meters (16 to 23 ft). The petioles of the leaves have a characteristic groove up to 10 centimetres (3.9 in) long. The large leaves with a soft furry underside have been referred to as "bushman's toilet paper".

== Description ==
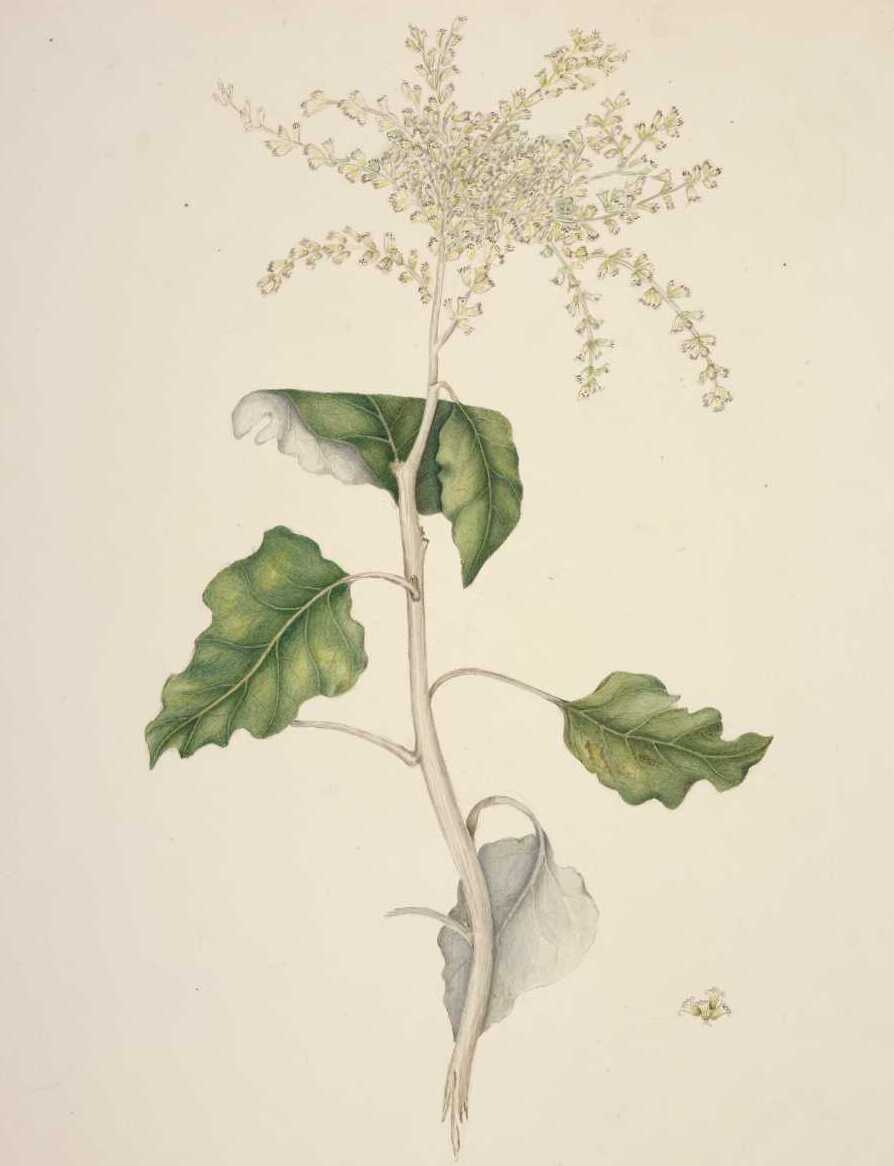
1842 botanical illustration of rangiora by Martha King

Rangiora is a species of shrub or small tree which grows to around 6 metres (20 ft) tall and has corky bark. It has leathery 5–25 centimetres (2.0–9.8 in) long, 5–20 centimetres (2.0–7.9 in) wide leaves suspended off of 8–10 centimetres (3.1–3.9 in) grooved petioles. The leaves are a pale green above and white underneath as the underside is covered with many tiny white hairs. It flowers from August to October with dramatic panicle inflorescences made of six ribs and 3 millimetres (0.12 in) long involucral bracts. Pseudanthium are 5 millimetres (0.20 in) in diameter and the inflorescences contain 10–12 yellow florets. The seeds are oblong and 1–1.8 millimetres (0.039–0.071 in) long, with 2–3 millimetres (0.079–0.118 in) rough yellow pappus. It fruits from November to December and disperses its seeds via the wind.

== Etymology ==
The Māori language name for the plant, rangioraa, is of uncertain origin, but is formed from the words rangi (sky) and ora (health). The word is unique to Māori, and not used in other Polynesian languages for similar plants. Other Māori language names include pukapuka, whārangi, kōuaha, pukariao, puke-rangiora, raurākau, raurēkau and whārangi-tawhito. The species epithet Repanda means irregularly undulating, referring to the leaf margins. The colloquial name bushman's friend was coined by early European settlers in New Zealand, and is a reference to its use as an emergency toilet paper in the bush.

== Distribution and habitat ==
Rangiora is endemic to New Zealand, growing in the North Island and the South Island as far south as Greymouth. It is often an early pioneer species in disturbed areas of forest.

== Ecology ==
B. repanda plays host to the larvae of the moth species Stigmella cypracma. The larvae mine the leaves of B. repanda leaving damaged leaves in their wake.

== Cultivation ==
Rangiora is easy to grow either from seed or from cuttings, though may be short-lived and requires a hard prune after flowering.

== In Māori culture ==
Rangiora in Māori culture is a symbol of health and living, often contrasted with kawakawa, a plant associated with death. Māori used the plant for a number of medicinal uses. Rangiora leaves were used for wounds and old ulcerated sores, and the gum was chewed for foul breath but was poisonous if swallowed. The plants were also used by hunters as a way to mark trails, by breaking and exposing the white undersides of the leaves.

The ethnographer Richard Taylor recorded that the leaves were used to wrap cakes made from hīnau berry meal while they cooked in a hāngī. They were also used, he claimed, to line the baskets which held the siftings of raupō pollen in the process of making bread (from the pollen called pungapunga), the siftings then being thrown out. An oil can be produced by heating the gum, which was applied to fish hooks as a lacquer.

Rangiora leaves are also the basis for topa, a paper plane made from the leaves by children.

== Modern uses ==
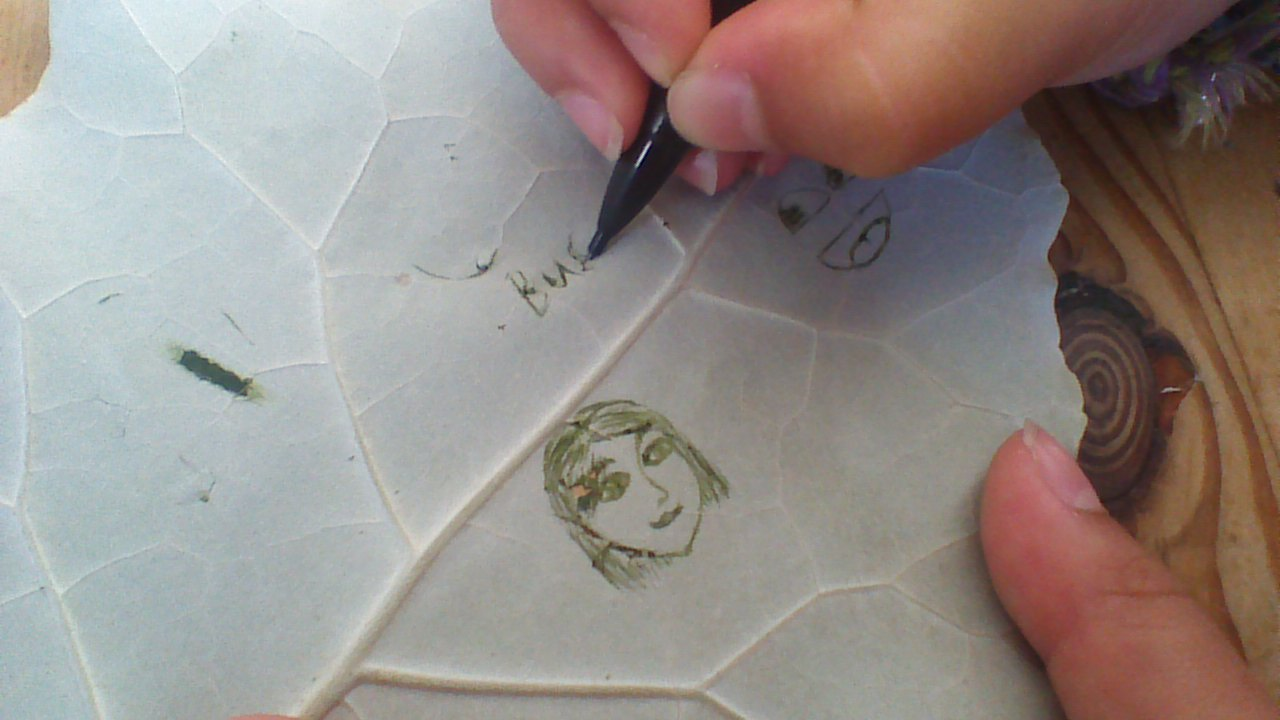
Notepaper writing on rangiora leaves

The leaves of the plant were used as emergency toilet paper used by early European settlers living or working in the bush. The reverse side of the leaves have also been used as notepaper and in place of postcards.

== Toxicity ==
Rangiora is poisonous, and has been linked to livestock deaths and poisonings. When used in Māori traditional cuisine, the gum of the plant is used as a chewing gum and not swallowed, or leaves of the plant are used to wrap food cooked in a hāngī. The botanist and chemist Bernard Aston reported that the honey made by bees produced with the nectar from rangiora is poisonous, and for this reason Māori never collected honey when it was in flower. Livestock, particularly horses, are affected by the plant's toxins, making the animals appear drunk, stagger around and fall, often to their death, as a result.

== Gallery ==
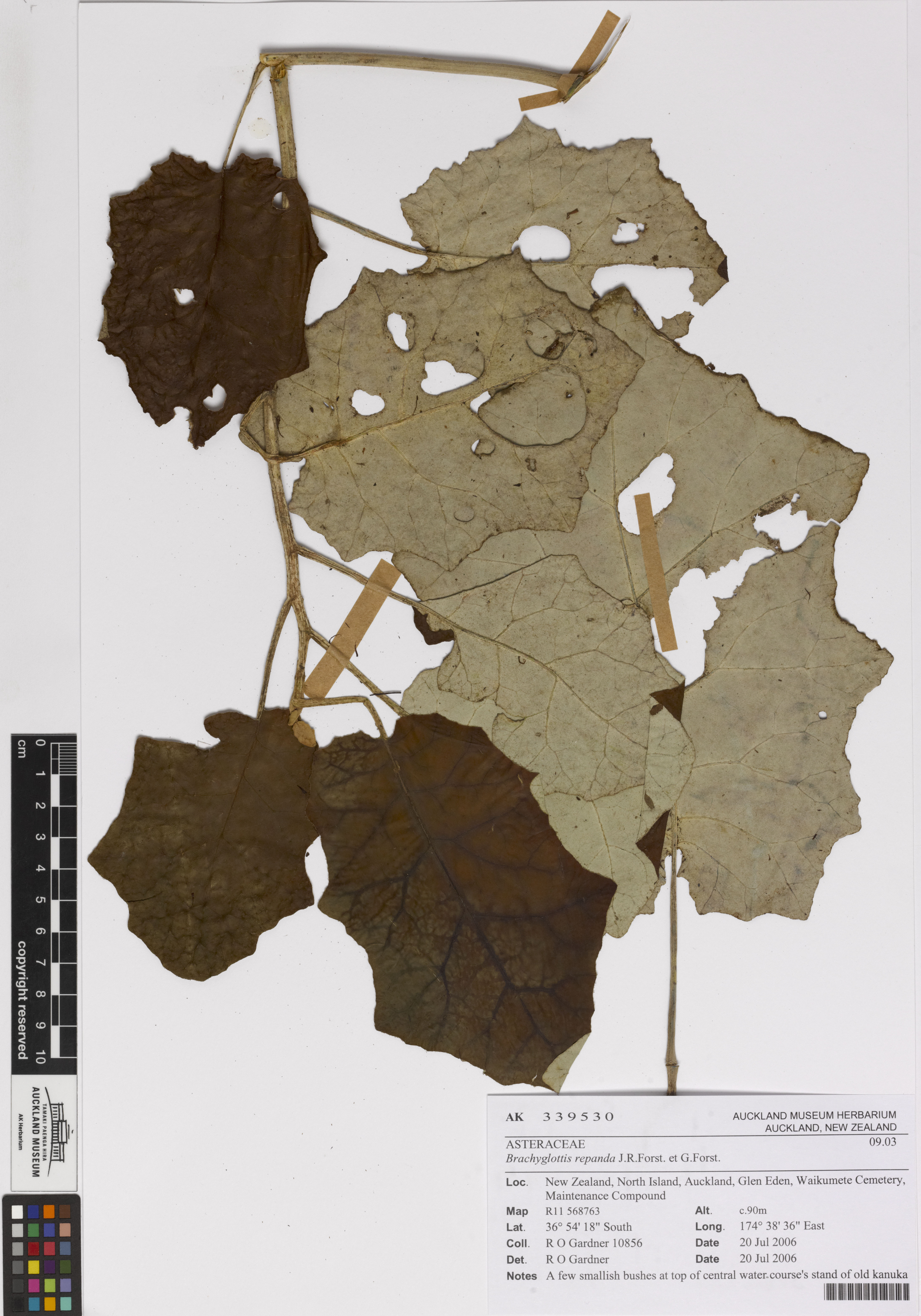
Herbarium specimen

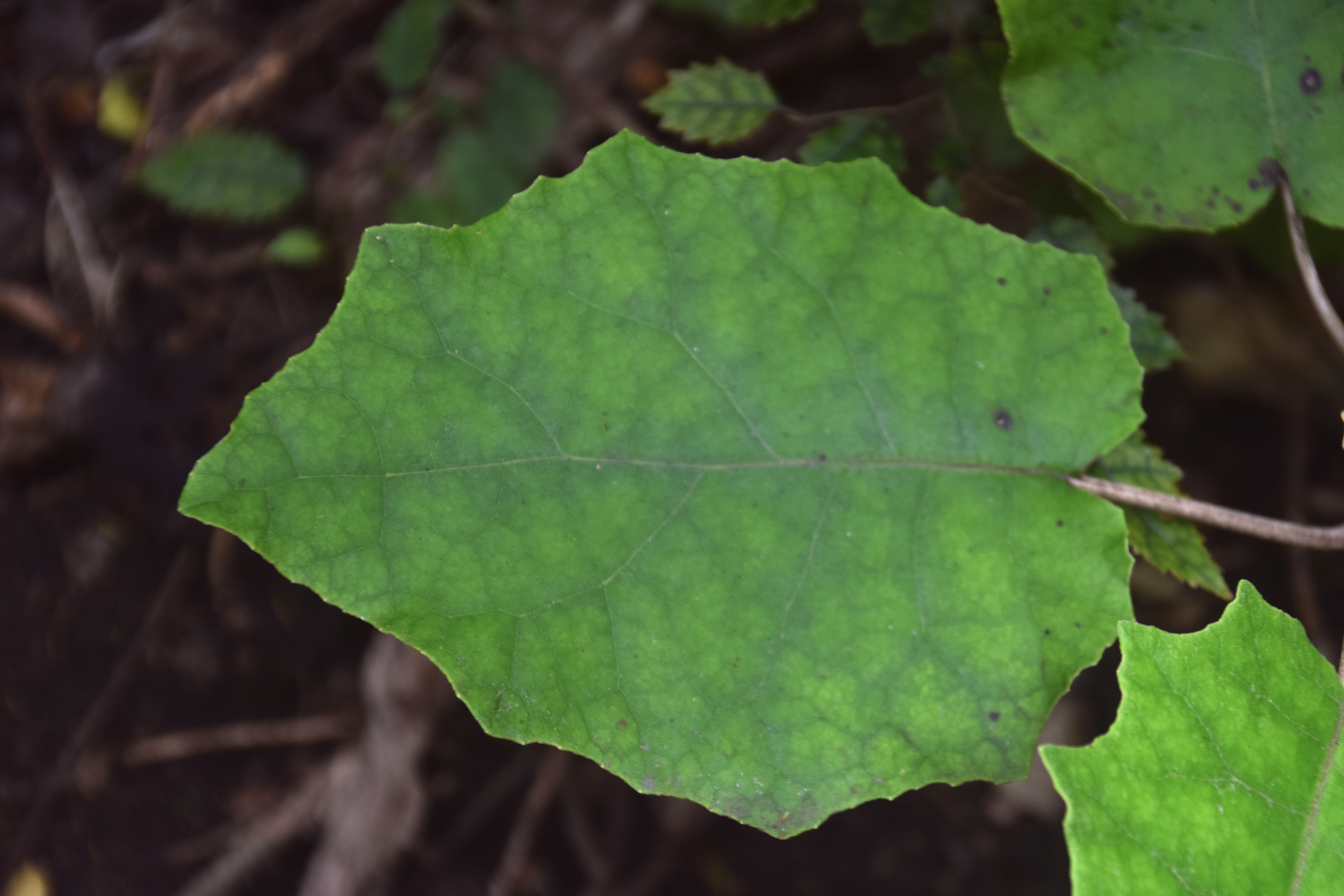
Leaf

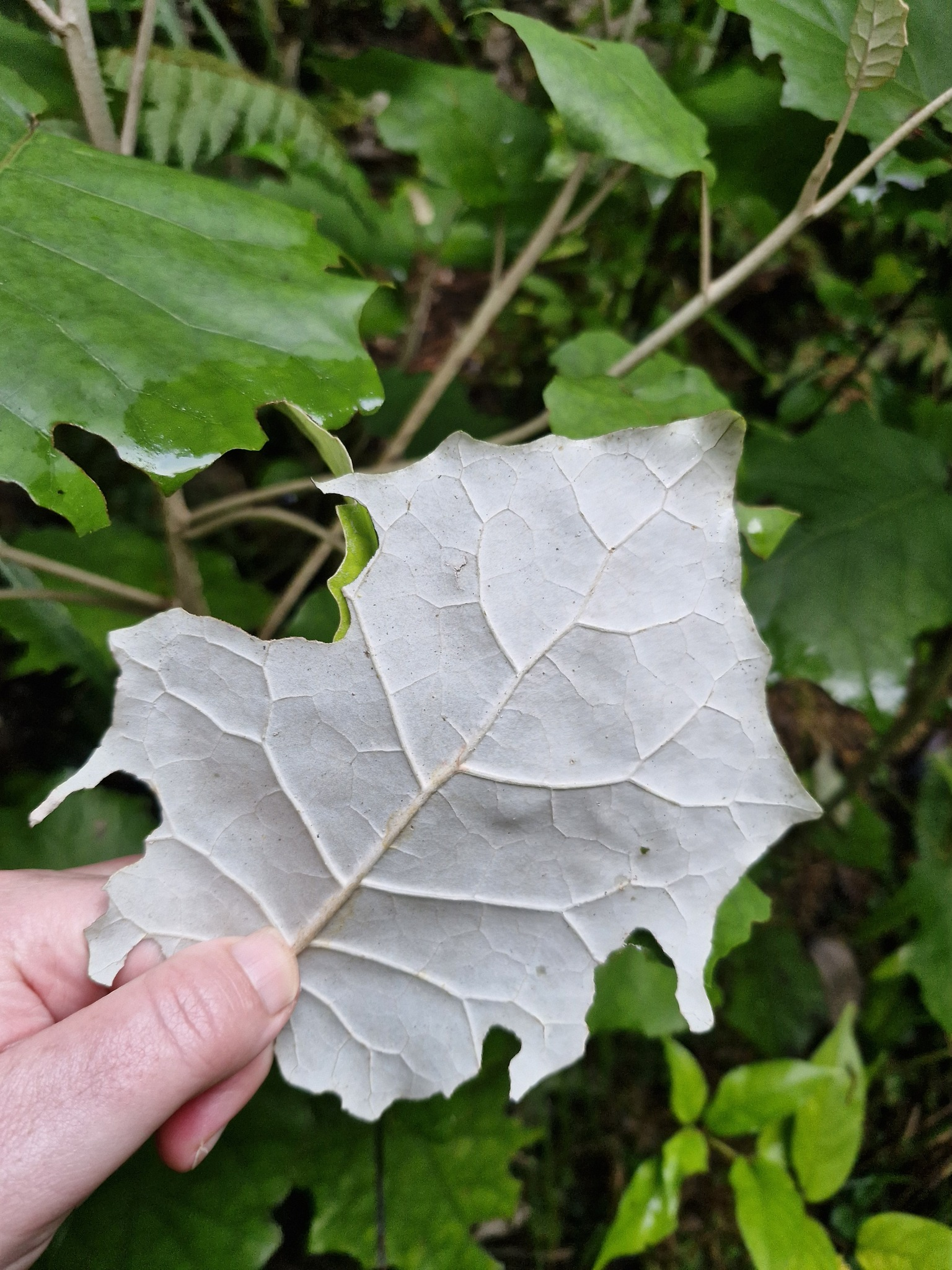
Underside of leaf

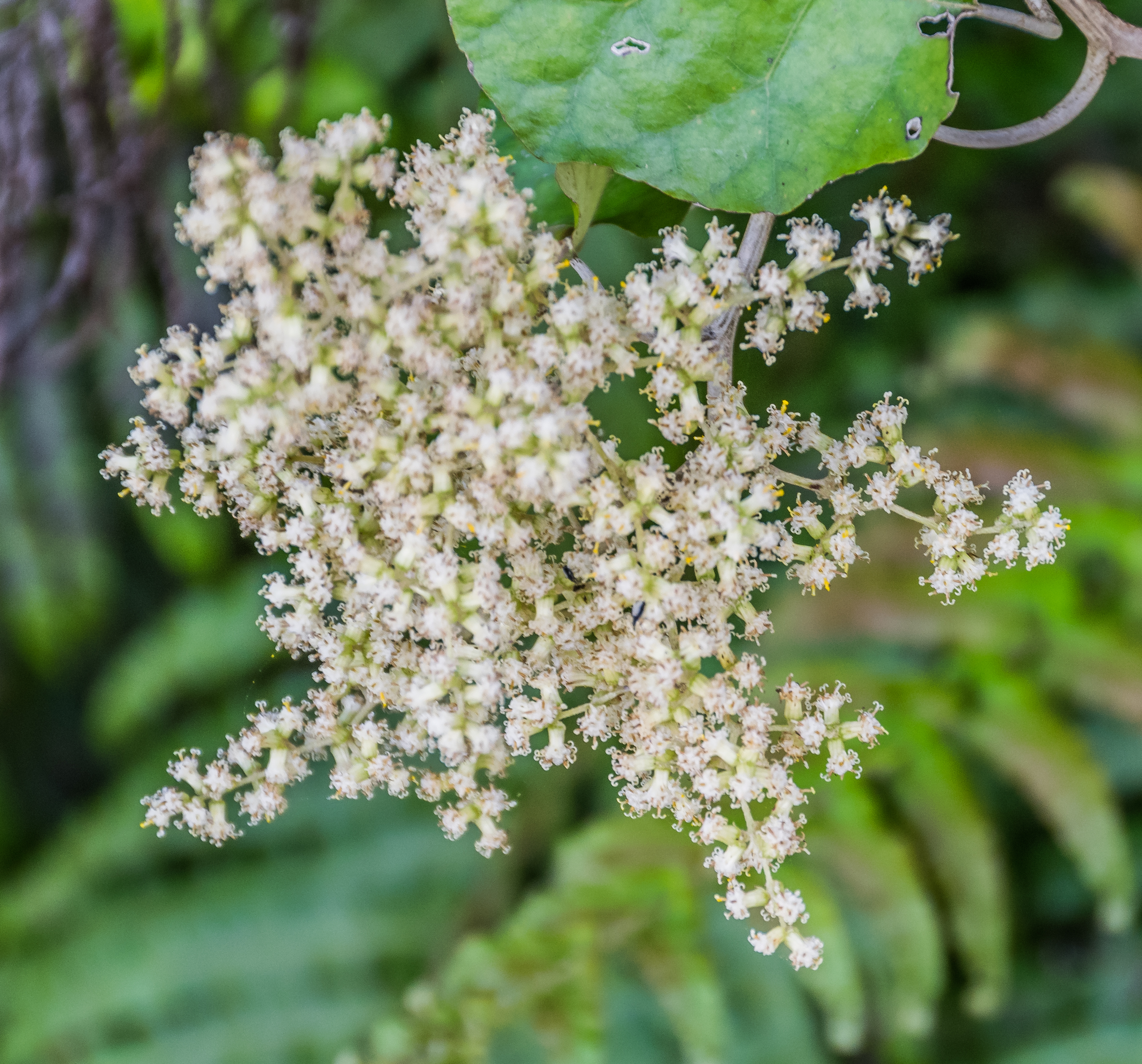
Flowers

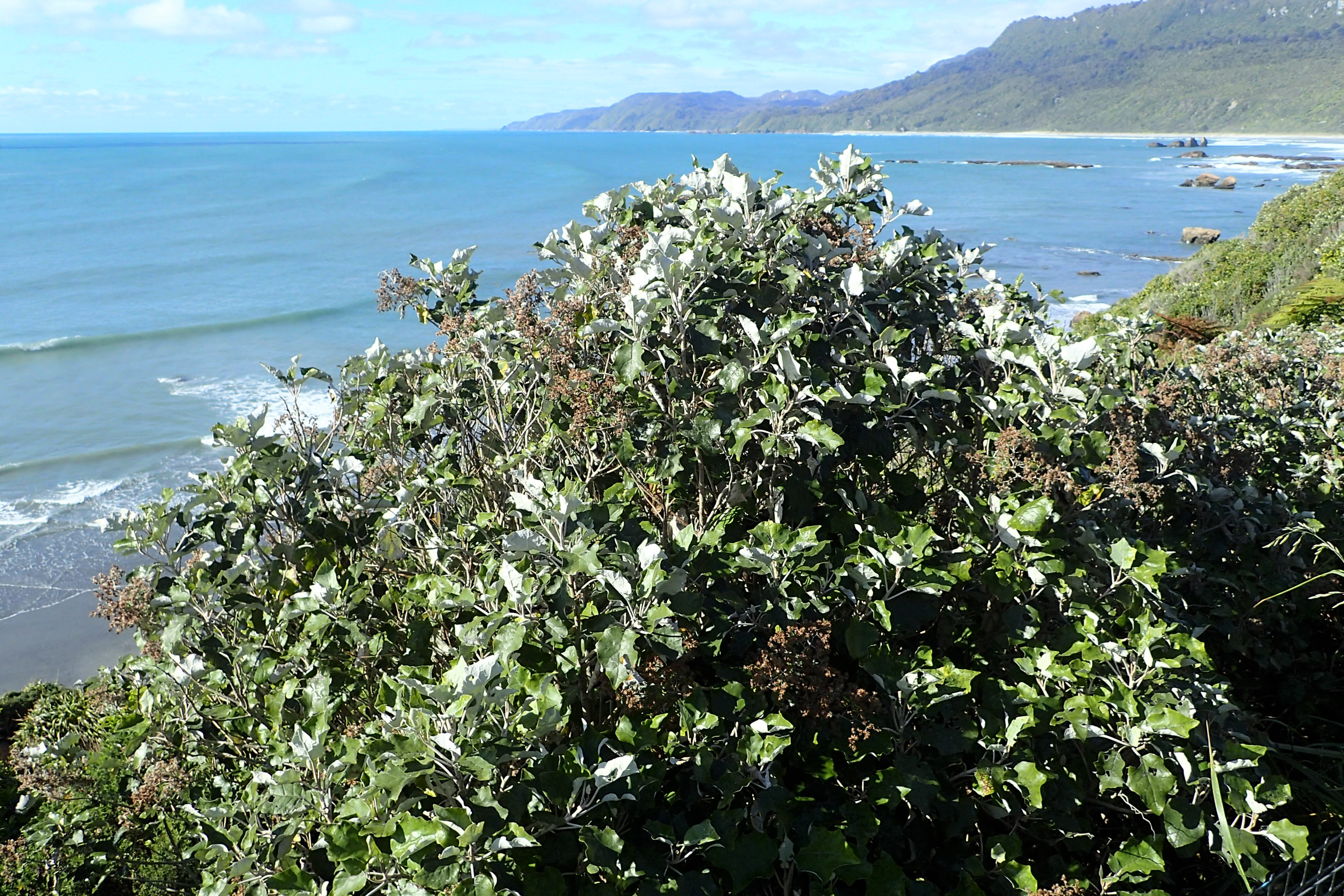
A large rangiora growing on the coast at Meybille Bay, West Coast District, South Island
