= Mid-Mesozoic Parasitoid Revolution =

The Mid-Mesozoic Parasitoid Revolution (MMPR) was an evolutionary radiation of insect parasites and parasitoids from the Toarcian to the Albian.

== Timeline ==
The MMPR represented a major reorganisation of terrestrial food webs. Before the MMPR, parasitoid insects were absent in many fossil assemblages, such as the Triassic-aged Madygen, Molteno, Beishan, Shangtu, and Cow Branch Formations. The MMPR was marked by an increase in diversity among coleopterans, dipterans, strepsipterans, and hymenopterans, the main insect clades containing parasitoids, that reflected these clades entering parasitoid niches.

The beginning phase of the MMPR lasted from the late Early Toarcian to the Valanginian. It is documented in the Jiulongshan and Karabastau Formations from the Middle and Late Jurassic, respectively. In the Jiulongshan's Yanliao Biota, the neuropteran parasitoid lineage Mantispidae, the dipteran parasitoid lineages Nemestrinidae and Eremochaetidae, and the coleopteran parasitoid families Ripiphoridae and Staphylinidae are represented, though the staphylinid subfamilies known to contain parasitoid species are absent. Most notably, the Yanliao Biota contains the plant-associated sawfly clades Xyeloidea, Tenthredinoidea, Pamphilioidea, Cephoidea, Siricoidea, and Orussoidea, the latter being the only parasitoid sawfly lineage, and the apocritan parasitoid clades Evanioidea, Ephialtitoidea, and Proctotrupoidea, which belong to the hymenopteran order. In the Karabastau Formation, a similar family-level diversity of parasitoid hymenopterans is represented but with double the species diversity. Nemestrinids, acrocerids, and eremochaetids represent dipteran parasitoids from the Karabastau and mantispids represent neuropteran ones, with anthribids and staphylinids being represented among coleopteran parasitoids. The assemblage found in the Berriasian Lulworth Formation has also been studied and cited as evidence of the MMPR, as it contains twenty species of parasitoid apocritans, including megalyroids, evanioids, proctotrupoids, ichneumonoids, chrysidoids, and the enigmatic Apocrites.

Phase 2 of the MMPR, lasting from the Late Valanginian to the Albian, involved even further parasitoid diversification. In the Barremian Yixian Formation, the number of hymenopteran parasitoid lineages jumped to thirteen from the eight to nine found in the previous lagerstatten. Amongst evanioids, there were evaniids, praeaulacids, aulacids, and baissids. Ephialtitoids were represented by ephialtitids; Amongst procrotrupoids, the mesoserphids, helorids, pelecinids, roproniids, and serphids were represented. Ichneumonoids, chrysidoids, and vespoids were represented in the Yixian by ichneumonids, bethylonymids, and scoliids, respectively. Dipteran species diversity was the same as in the Jurassic lagerstatten and contained among the eremochaetids and nemestrinids. Thirty-seven parasitoid coleopterans were found, mainly among staphylinids but also among carabids, while nine species of mantispid neuropterans were found.

== Effects ==
The MMPR's ecological effects were reflected by the greater host specificity of gymnosperms as compared to angiosperms and ferns, as well as by the low rate of turnover and high degree of nestedness among insect herbivores that fed on gymnosperms during and following the MMPR.
