= List of Goera species =

This is a list of 128 species in the genus Goera, little gray sedges.

== Goera species ==
- Goera alleni Malicky & Chantaramongkol, 1992
- Goera altofissura Hwang, 1957
- Goera anakpiatu Malicky, 1995
- Goera anaksembilan Malicky, 1995
- Goera aneityuma Neboiss, 1986
- Goera antigone Malicky & Chantaramongkol, 1997
- Goera antiugo Malicky & Chantaramongkol, 1992
- Goera archaon Ross, 1947
- Goera arcuata Yang & Armitage, 1996
- Goera arisudana Schmid, 1991
- Goera armata Navas, 1933
- Goera ateduna Malicky & Chantaramongkol, 1992
- Goera atiugo Malicky & Chantaramongkol, 1992
- Goera atra Mosely, 1938
- Goera baishanzuensis Yang & Morse, 1997
- Goera bicuspidata Yang & Armitage, 1996
- Goera calcarata Banks, 1899
- Goera clavifera Schmid, 1965
- Goera conclusa Ulmer, 1905
- Goera crassata Schmid, 1965
- Goera curvispina Martynov, 1935
- Goera dairiana Malicky, 1978
- Goera dandaka Schmid, 1991
- Goera devinat Malicky & Chantaramongkol, 1992
- Goera dierli Malicky & Chantaramongkol, 1992
- Goera digitata Martynov, 1931
- Goera dilipa Schmid, 1991
- Goera disparilis Banks, 1937
- Goera diversa Yang in Yang, Wang & Leng, 1997
- Goera echo Malicky & Thani in Malicky, 2000
- Goera fijiana Banks, 1924
- Goera fimbriata Navás, 1932
- Goera fissa Ulmer, 1926
- Goera foliacea Schmid, 1965
- Goera fuscula Banks, 1905
- Goera gyotokui Kobayashi, 1957
- Goera hageni (Barnard, 1934)
- Goera holzschuhi Malicky & Chantaramongkol, 1992
- Goera horni Navás, 1926
- Goera ilo Malicky & Chantaramongkol, 1992
- Goera impar Ulmer, 1930
- Goera interrogationis Botosaneanu, 1970
- Goera jaewoni Park & Bae, 1999
- Goera janaka Schmid, 1991
- Goera japonica Banks, 1906
- Goera kalimpa Mosely, 1938
- Goera karafutonis (Matsumura, 1911)
- Goera katugalkanda Schmid, 1958
- Goera katugastota Schmid, 1958
- Goera kausalya Schmid, 1991
- Goera kawamotonis Kobayashi, 1987
- Goera kirilagoda Schmid, 1958
- Goera kursea Mosely, 1938
- Goera kyotonis Tsuda, 1942
- Goera latispina Schmid, 1965
- Goera lepidoptera Schmid, 1965
- Goera longispina Ulmer, 1907
- Goera maithili Schmid, 1991
- Goera malayana Fischer, 1970
- Goera mandana Mosely, 1938
- Goera martynowi Ulmer, 1932
- Goera matuilla Malicky & Chantaramongkol, 1992
- Goera minor Mosely, 1938
- Goera minuta Ulmer, 1927
- Goera mishmia Mosely, 1938
- Goera monticolaria Mey, 1997
- Goera morsei Yang & Armitage, 1996
- Goera mustellina (Hagen, 1859)
- Goera nielseni Malicky, 1994
- Goera nigricornis Navás, 1932
- Goera nipponensis Navas, 1933
- Goera octospina Banks, 1920
- Goera parabhava Schmid, 1991
- Goera paracrita Schmid, 1991
- Goera paragoda Schmid, 1958
- Goera parakiya Schmid, 1991
- Goera paramahansa Schmid, 1991
- Goera paramika Schmid, 1991
- Goera parayatta Schmid, 1991
- Goera paropadecha Schmid, 1991
- Goera parvula Martynov, 1935
- Goera pilosa (Fabricius, 1775)
- Goera prapatana Malicky, 1978
- Goera prominens Ulmer, 1911
- Goera pugnio Ulmer, 1951
- Goera quadripunctata Schmid, 1959
- Goera raghu Schmid, 1991
- Goera rakchasa Schmid, 1991
- Goera ramosa Yang & Armitage, 1996
- Goera ranauana Ulmer, 1951
- Goera recta Yang & Morse, 1997
- Goera redacta Yang & Armitage, 1996
- Goera redsat Malicky & Chantaramongkol, 1992
- Goera redsomar Malicky & Chantaramongkol, 1992
- Goera relicta Betten, 1909
- Goera rolandmuelleri Malicky & Chantaramongkol, 1992
- Goera rumaba Mosely, 1938
- Goera sarayu Schmid, 1991
- Goera schmidi Denning, 1982
- Goera seccio Malicky & Chantaramongkol, 1992
- Goera siccana Mey, 1998
- Goera sira Malicky & Chantaramongkol, 1992
- Goera skiasma Neboiss, 1990
- Goera solicur Malicky & Chantaramongkol, 1992
- Goera spicata Schmid, 1965
- Goera spinosa Yang & Armitage, 1996
- Goera spiralis Yang & Armitage, 1996
- Goera squamifera Martynov, 1909
- Goera stylata Ross, 1938
- Goera tagalica Banks, 1931
- Goera tarockana Malicky, 1978
- Goera tarumana Malicky, 1978
- Goera tecta Schmid, 1965
- Goera tenuis Ulmer, 1927
- Goera townesi Morse, 1971
- Goera tricaisema Malicky, 1995
- Goera tridens Mosely, 1938
- Goera trispina Ulmer, 1930
- Goera trouca Malicky & Chantaramongkol, 1992
- Goera tungusensis Martynov, 1909
- Goera uniformis Banks, 1931
- Goera vaichravana Schmid, 1991
- Goera vaidehi Schmid, 1991
- Goera valmiki Schmid, 1991
- Goera vinata Schmid, 1991
- Goera vulpina (Hagen, 1859)
- Goera yajnadatta Schmid, 1991
- Goera yamamotoi (Tsuda, 1942)
