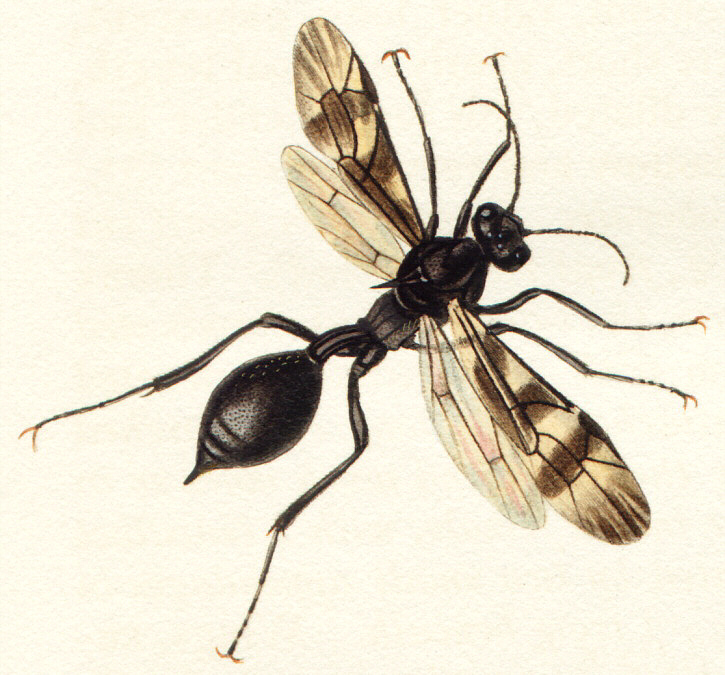
- Agriotypus armatus from British Entomology

Scientific classification
- Domain: Eukaryota
- Kingdom: Animalia
- Phylum: Arthropoda
- Class: Insecta
- Order: Hymenoptera
- Family: Ichneumonidae
- Subfamily: Agriotypinae; Haliday,1838

Genus
- Agriotypus

= Agriotypinae =

Subfamily of wasps

Agriotypinae is a subfamily of ichneumonid parasitoid wasps found in the Palaearctic region. This subfamily contains only one genus, Agriotypus. The known species are aquatic idiobiont ectoparasitoids of Trichoptera pupae.

There has been disagreement over the taxonomic placement of Agriotypus. It has variously been placed in Proctotrupoidea and considered a separate family of Ichneumonoidea.

== Life cycle ==
The development of Agriotypus armatus has been documented on the host Silo pallipes in a stream in South-West England. The life cycle of the wasps took one year, with adults present in May and June. Eggs were laid in the pupae or prepupae of the host. The larvae underwent 5 larval stages before overwintering as adults in their pupal case. Larval instars 1-4 fed externally on the host, while instar 5 rapidly consumed the entire host body. Before pupating, the larvae built a separate pupal case from silk within the trichopteran pupal case. The wasp pupal case included a 1.5 cm silk ribbon which extended into the water, probably to act as a plastron. Adults emerged in the spring, after the water temperature had reached 10 degrees C.
