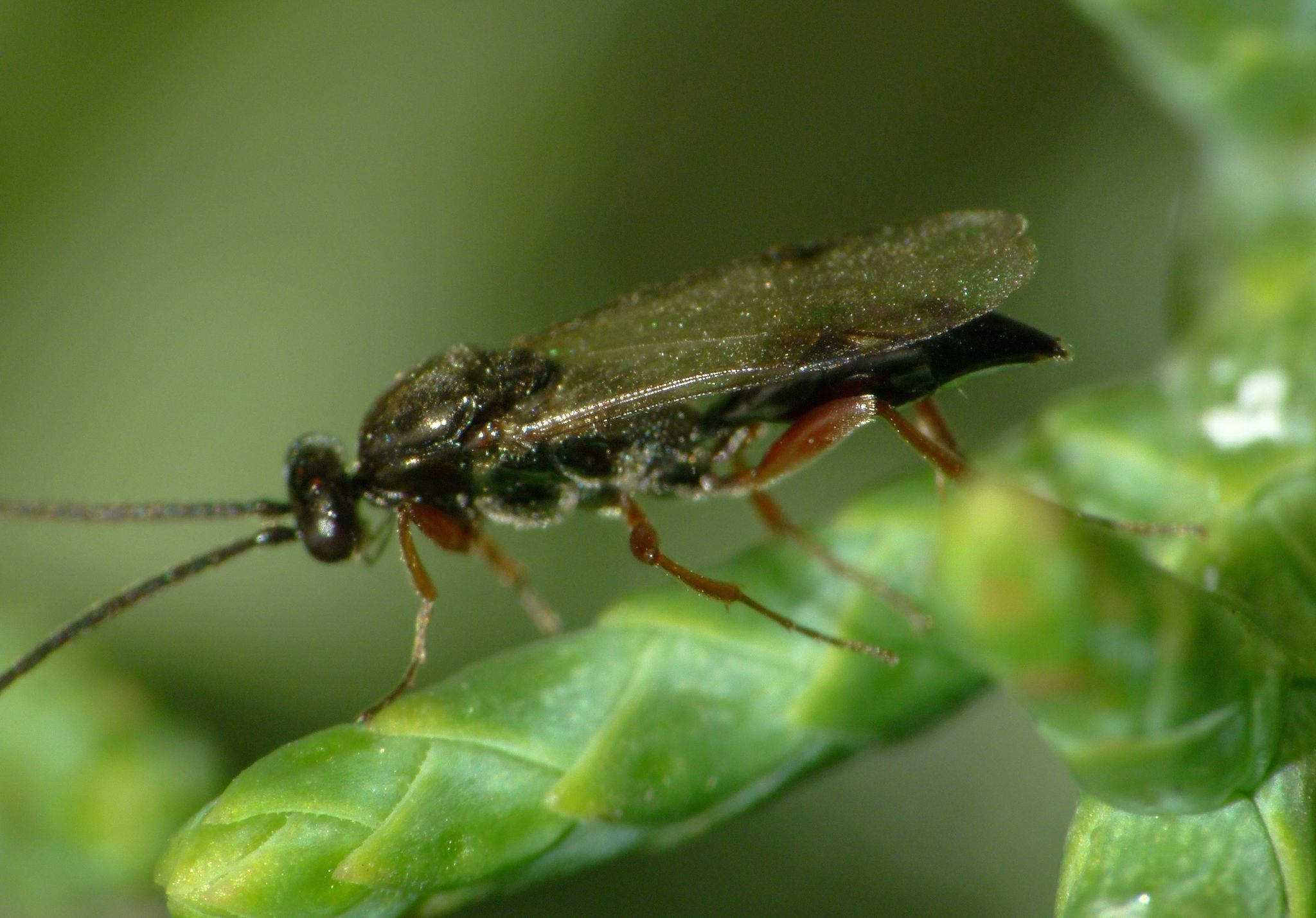

Scientific classification
- Kingdom: Animalia
- Phylum: Arthropoda
- Clade: Pancrustacea
- Class: Insecta
- Order: Hymenoptera
- Family: Proctotrupidae
- Genus: Fustiserphus
- Species: F. intrudens

Binomial name
- Fustiserphus intrudens (Smith, 1878)

Synonyms
- List: Proctotrupes intrudens Smith, 1878; Proctotrypes obliquus Ashmead, 1893; Practotrypes intrudens (Smith, 1878); Phaenaserphus intrudens (Smith, 1878); Phaenoserphus obliquus (Ashmead, 1893)

= Fustiserphus intrudens =

Species of wasp

Fustiserphus intrudens is a species of Proctotrupidae endemic to New Zealand. It is widespread throughout New Zealand and found in a variety of habitats. It was first described in 1878 by Frederick Smith. It is a parasite of moth larvae from the genus Tingena.

== Taxonomy ==
This species was first described as Proctotrupes intrudens in 1878 by Frederick Smith from specimens collected in the Canterbury region. It has undergone numerous taxonomic changes, but was most recently revised in 1981.

== Description ==
The adult is overall black in colour. The legs are coloured reddish brown and the wings are clear in colour, with the veins brownish. In females, the sheath covering the ovipositor is reddish brown. It can distinguished from other Fustiserphus by the absence of the notaulus (grooves on the thorax), the abdomen with a stalk that is 0.4 times as long as high and the base of the antennae is usually reddish brown.

== Distribution and habitat ==
The wasp is endemic to New Zealand where it is the most common Proctotrupidae and occurs throughout the North Island, South Island and Stewart Island. As an adult, it is present from December to mid-March. It occurs in a range of habitats such as native forest and shrublands.

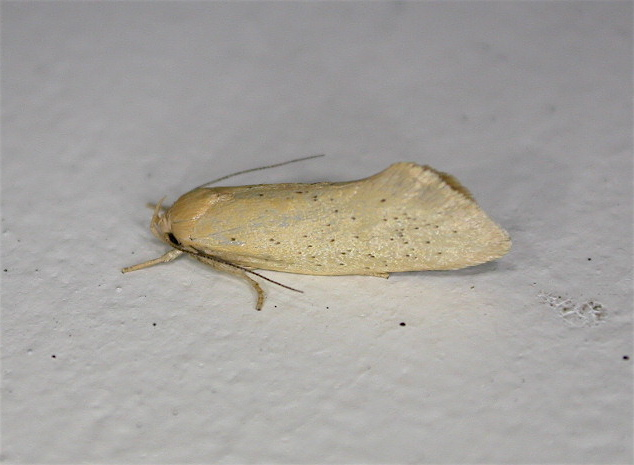
Tingena armigerella, the larvae of which are parasitised by Fustiserphus intrudens

== Hosts ==
Fustiserphus intrudens parasitises the larvae of moths from the genus Tingena. It has been recorded from the species Tingena armigerella and Tingena nycteris, but is presumed to parasitise other species from the same genus.
