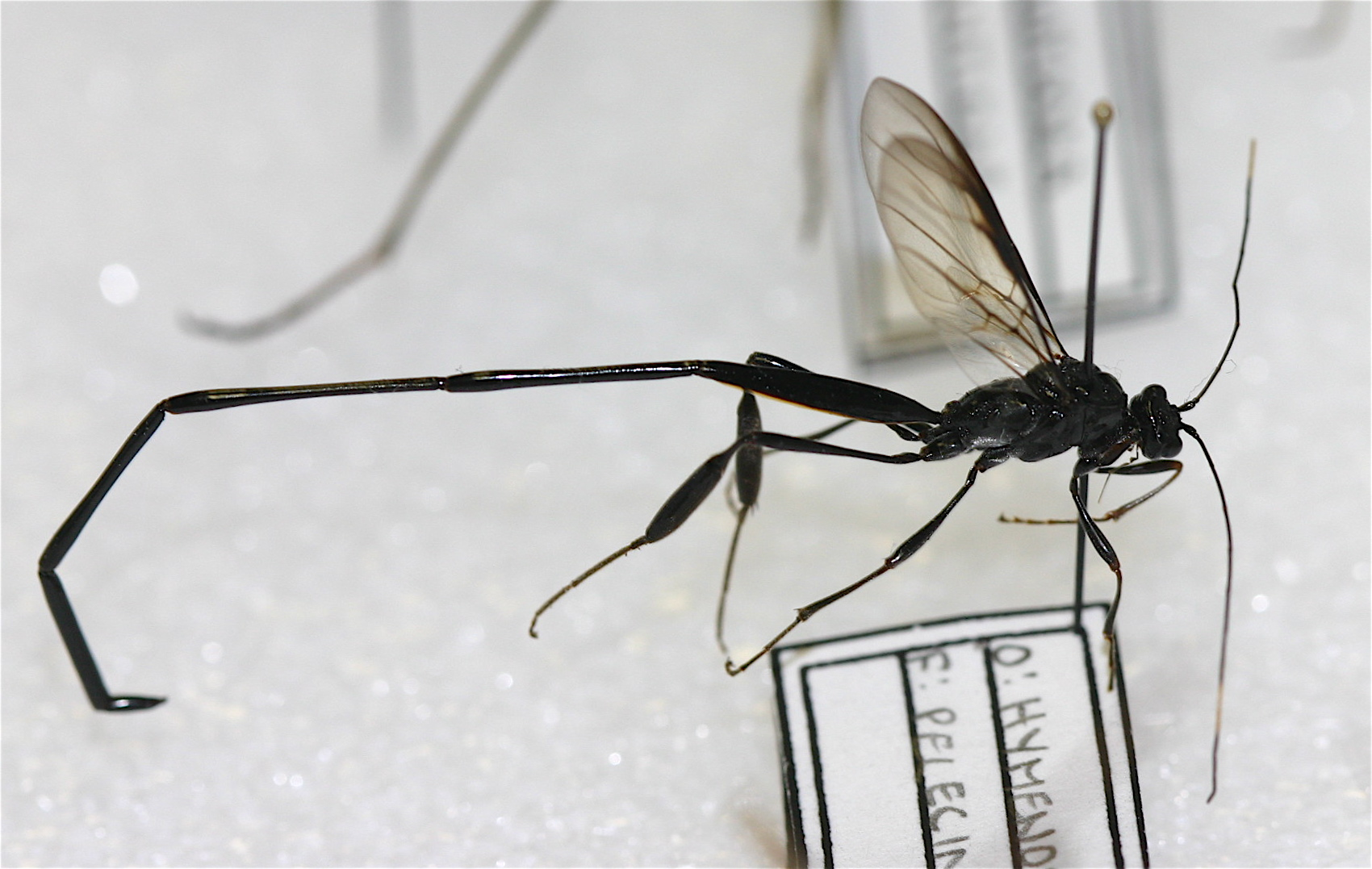
- Pelecinus polyturator

Scientific classification
- Kingdom: Animalia
- Phylum: Arthropoda
- Class: Insecta
- Order: Hymenoptera
- Superfamily: Proctotrupoidea
- Family: Pelecinidae
- Genus: Pelecinus; Latreille, 1800

Species
- Pelecinus dichrous Perty, 1833; Pelecinus polyturator (Drury, 1773); Pelecinus thoracicus Klug, 1841

= Pelecinus =

Genus of wasps

The genus Pelecinus is the only living member of the family Pelecinidae (there are also many fossil genera), and contains only three species, restricted to the New World. One species, Pelecinus polyturator, occurs from North through South America, and the others occur in Mexico (Pelecinus thoracicus) and South America (Pelecinus dichrous). The females are glossy wasps, very long (up to 7 cm) and the abdomen is extremely attenuated, used to lay eggs directly on scarab larvae buried in the soil.
