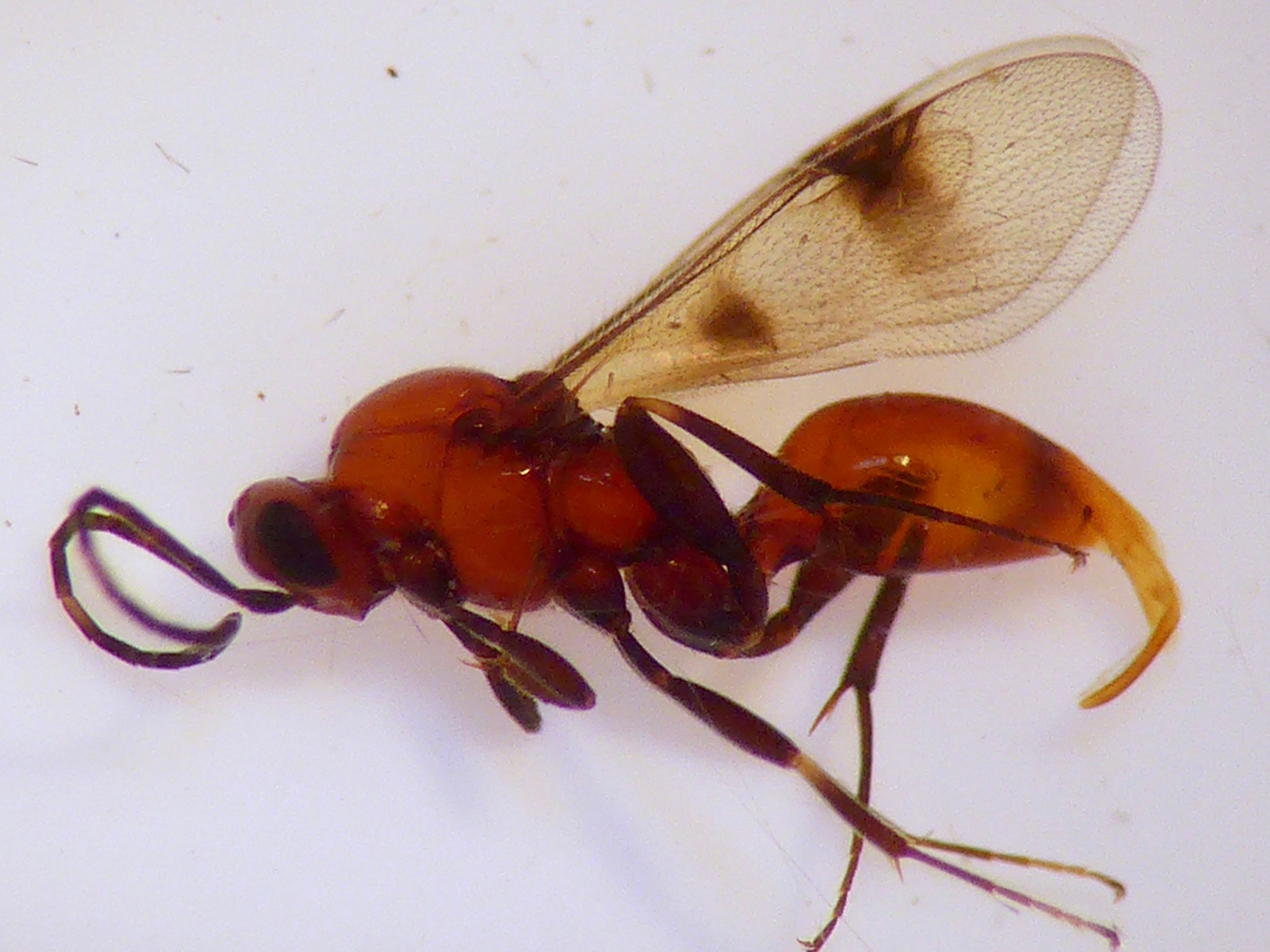
- Fustiserphus longiceps

Scientific classification
- Kingdom: Animalia
- Phylum: Arthropoda
- Clade: Pancrustacea
- Class: Insecta
- Order: Hymenoptera
- Superfamily: Proctotrupoidea
- Family: Proctotrupidae
- Genus: Fustiserphus; Townes & Townes, 1981

= Fustiserphus =

Genus of wasps

Fustiserphus is a genus of Proctotrupidae.

== Species ==
There are four accepted species in this genus:

- Fustiserphus intrudens (Smith, 1878)
- Fustiserphus longiceps Townes, 1981
- Fustiserphus pinorum (Brues, 1940)
- Fustiserphus reticulatus Townes, 1981
