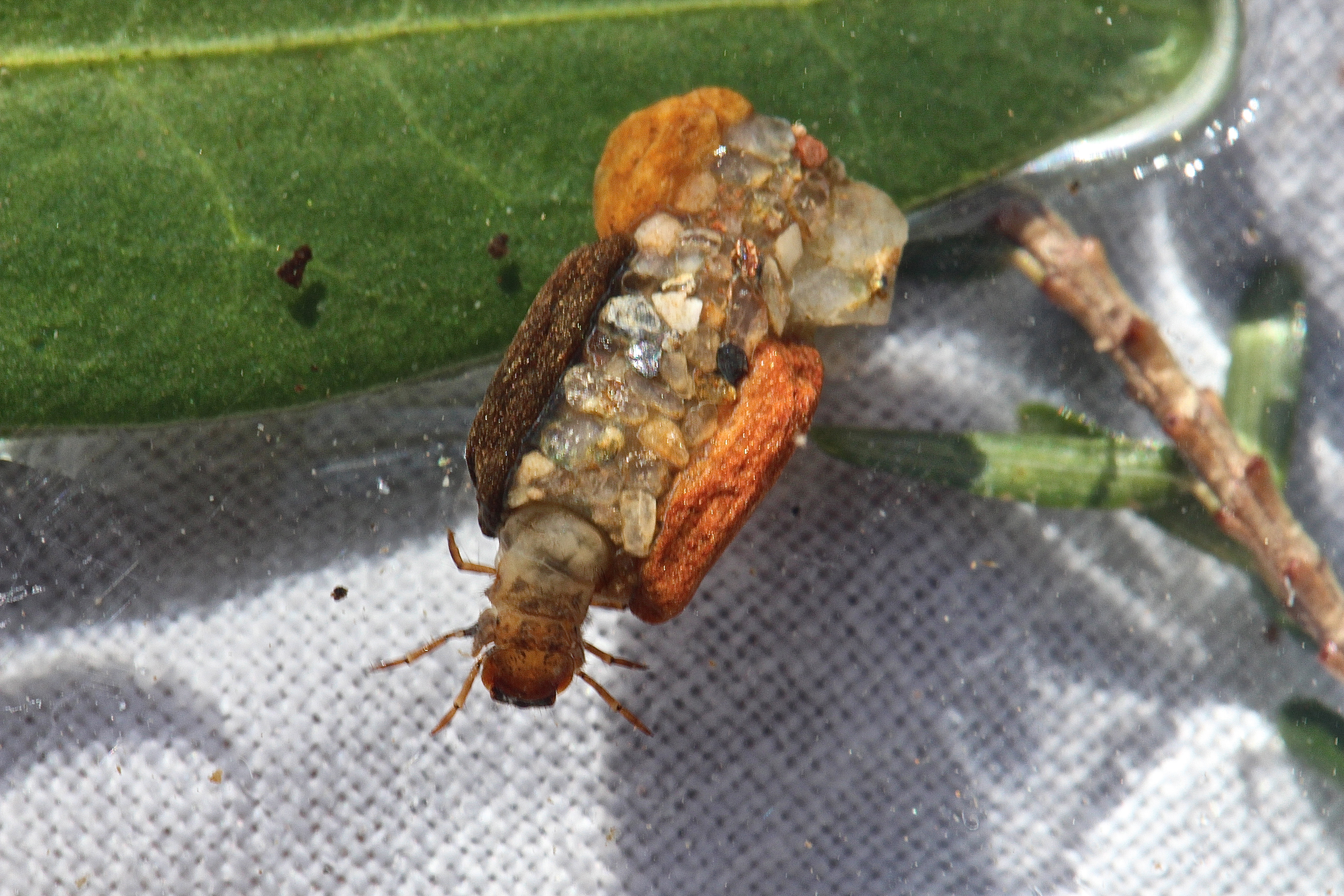

Scientific classification
- Domain: Eukaryota
- Kingdom: Animalia
- Phylum: Arthropoda
- Class: Insecta
- Order: Trichoptera
- Family: Goeridae
- Genus: Goera
- Species: G. fuscula

Binomial name
- Goera fuscula Banks, 1905

= Goera fuscula =

Species of caddisfly

Goera fuscula is a species of caddisfly in the family Goeridae. It is found in North America.
