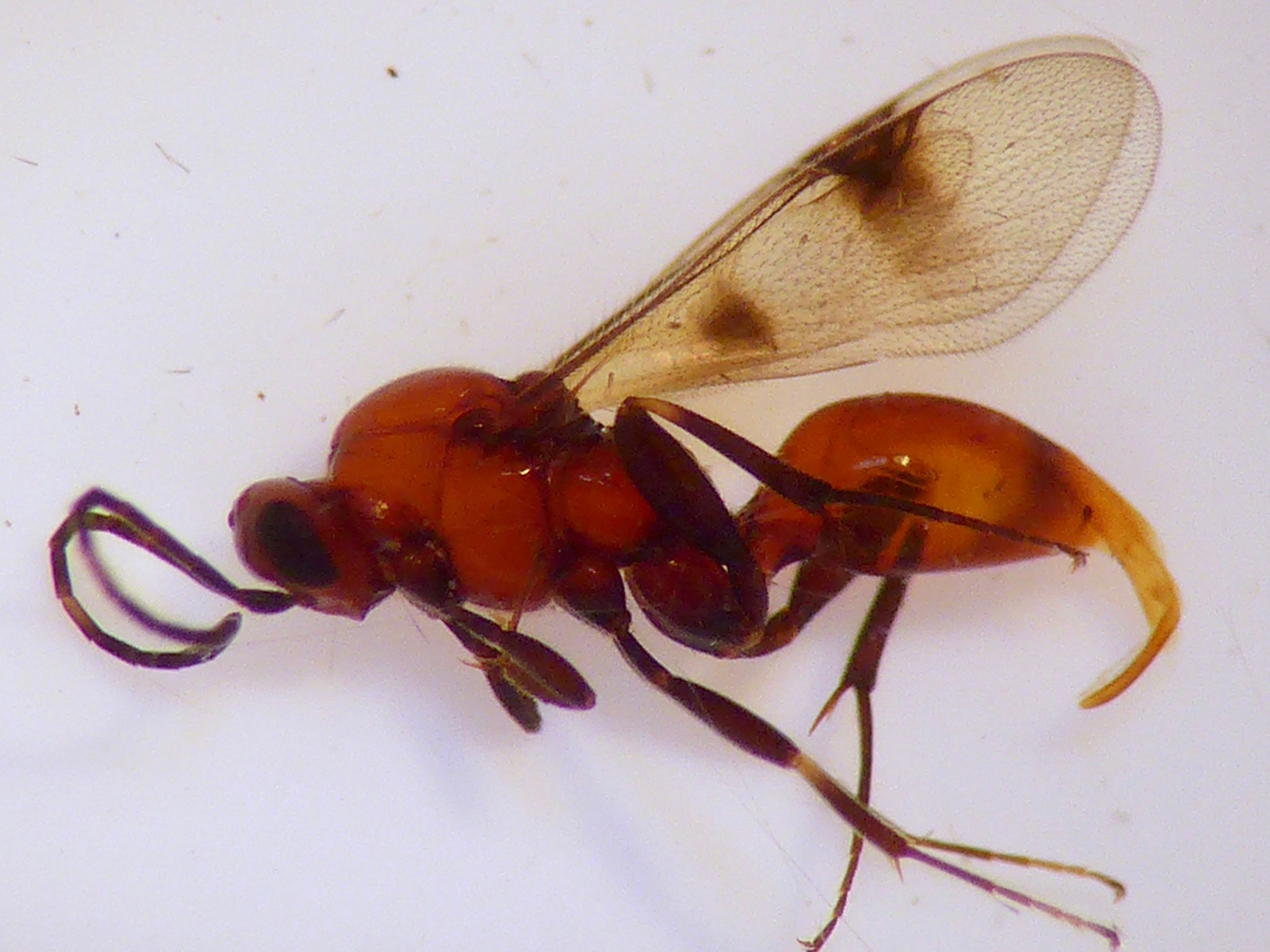

Scientific classification
- Kingdom: Animalia
- Phylum: Arthropoda
- Clade: Pancrustacea
- Class: Insecta
- Order: Hymenoptera
- Family: Proctotrupidae
- Genus: Fustiserphus
- Species: F. longiceps

Binomial name
- Fustiserphus longiceps Townes, 1981

= Fustiserphus longiceps =

Species of wasp

Fustiserphus longiceps is a species of Proctotrupidae native to New Zealand.
