= Oxyserphus =

Scientific classification
- Kingdom: Animalia
- Phylum: Arthropoda
- Clade: Pancrustacea
- Class: Insecta
- Order: Hymenoptera
- Superfamily: Proctotrupoidea
- Family: Proctotrupidae
- Genus: Oxyserphus; Masner, 1961

Genus of wasps

Oxyserphus is a genus of Procotrupidae.

== Species ==
Species in this genus include:

- Oxyserphus baini Townes, 1981
- Oxyserphus hamiferus (Brues, 1940)
- Oxyserphus kozlovi Kolyada, 2014†
- Oxyserphus maculipennis Cameron, 1888
- Oxyserphus obsolescens (Brues, 1940)†
- Oxyserphus rossica (Kolyada, 1996)
