= Proctorenyxidae =

Scientific classification
- Kingdom: Animalia
- Phylum: Arthropoda
- Clade: Pancrustacea
- Class: Insecta
- Order: Hymenoptera
- Superfamily: Proctotrupoidea
- Family: Proctorenyxidae; Lelej & Kozlov, 1999

Family of wasps

Proctorenyxidae is a rare family of wasps found in forests in the Eastern Palaearctic. Wasps in the family are relatively large with adults measuring 12-15mm. Their bodies are brownish-black with reddish-brown antennae and varying amounts of golden colored setae. While it is assumed they are parasitoids, their hosts are unknown.

== Taxonomy ==
The family was originally established in 1994 and was named Renyxidae. At the time, it contained only the genus Renyxa, however the genus shared a named with a genus of flatworms and so both it and the family were renamed (the prefix Procto- being added as a reference to the superfamily). Later in 2002, the genus Hsiufuropronia was transferred into the family from Roproniidae.

Proctorenyxidae currently contains 3 species in its 2 genera:

- Hsiufuropronia Yang, 1997
  - Hsiufuropronia chaoi Yang, 1997
- Proctorenyxa Lelej & Kozlov
  - Proctorenyxa incredibilis (Kozlov, 1994)
  - Proctorenyxa koreana Kim & Lee
