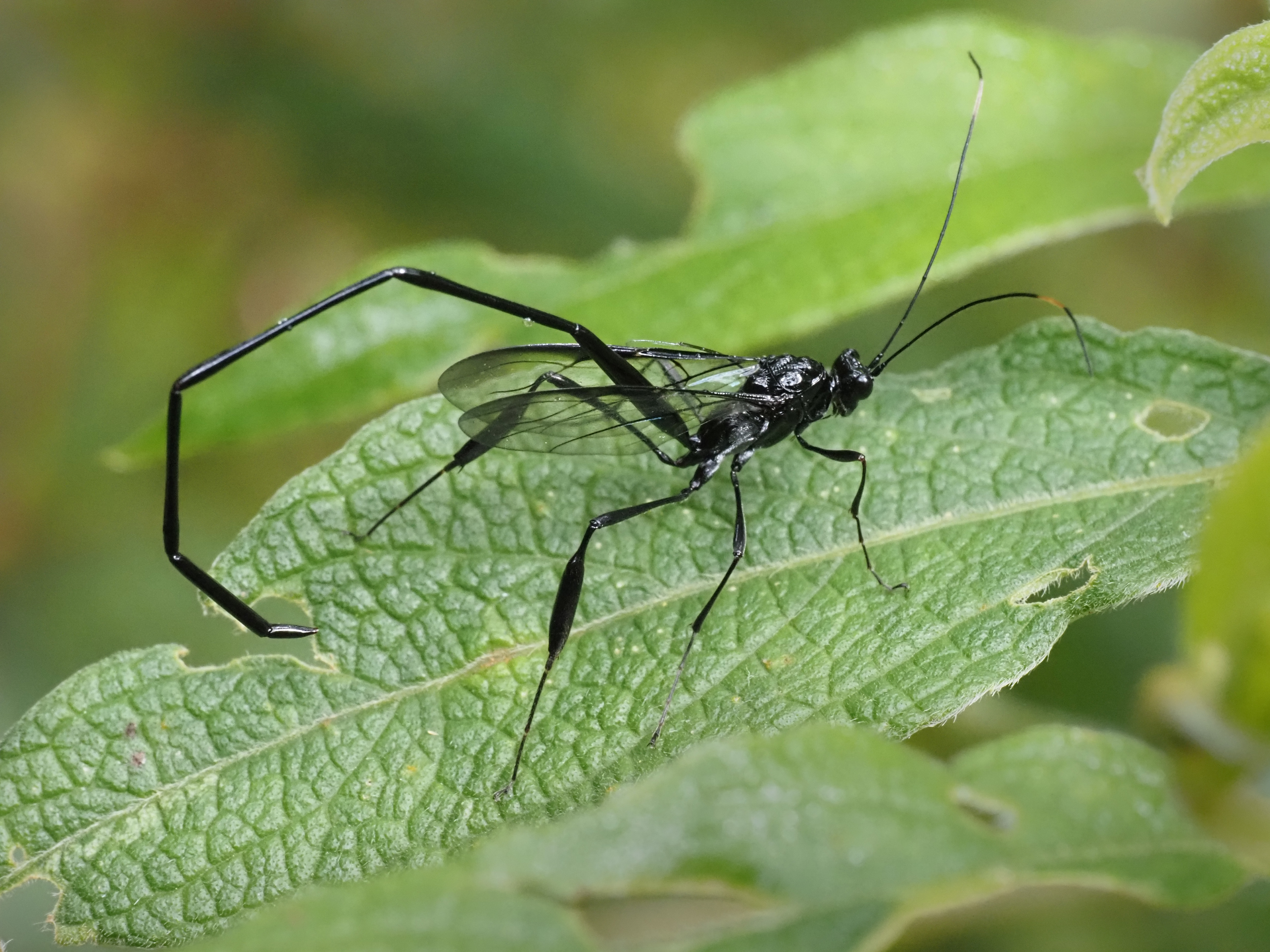

Scientific classification
- Kingdom: Animalia
- Phylum: Arthropoda
- Class: Insecta
- Order: Hymenoptera
- Family: Pelecinidae
- Genus: Pelecinus
- Species: P. polyturator

Binomial name
- Pelecinus polyturator (Drury, 1773)

= Pelecinus polyturator =

Species of wasp

Pelecinus polyturator is a species of wasp in the family Pelecinidae. The large (up to 7 cm) glossy black insects are the most common and well-known members of the family. The adults drink nectar, and they live in crop fields, woods, and suburban gardens throughout North, Central, and South America. Their antennae are long and the females have an elongated, cylindrical, articulated metasoma. They are parasitoids that lay their eggs directly into grubs of the June beetle (genus Phyllophaga) buried in the soil. The adults can be found in the late summer.

Some populations of Pelecinus polyturator are parthenogenic; females do not require fertilization by males to reproduce. Females are common throughout its range, but males are rare in the United States and Canada specially in some populations, and more prevalent further south.
