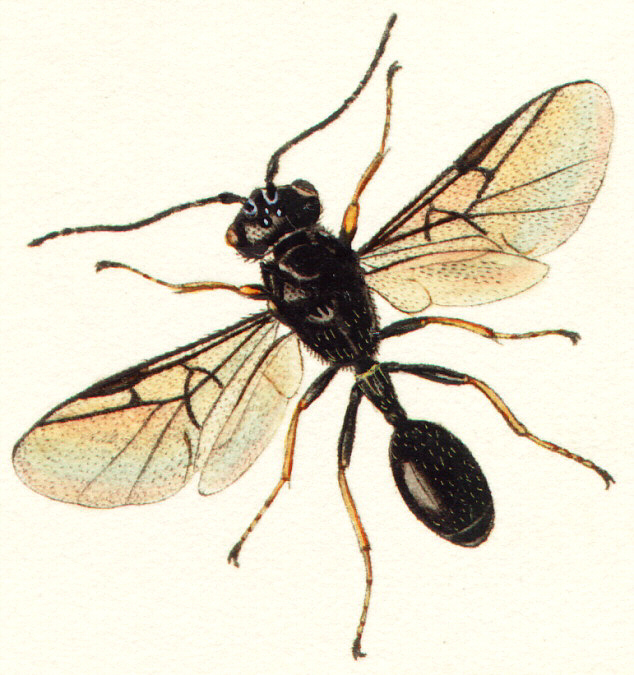
- Helorus anomalipes

Scientific classification
- Kingdom: Animalia
- Phylum: Arthropoda
- Class: Insecta
- Order: Hymenoptera
- Family: Heloridae
- Genus: Helorus; Latreille, 1802

= Helorus (wasp) =

Helorus Temporal range: Eocene–Recent

Genus of wasps

Helorus is a genus of parasitic wasps. It is the only living genus in the family Heloridae. There are about 12 described species in Helorus, found worldwide Members of the genus are parasitic on green lacewings. The oldest fossils are from Eocene aged Baltic amber.

== Species ==
- Helorus alborzicus Izadizadeh et al., 2015
- Helorus anomalipes (Panzer, 1798)
- Helorus australiensis New, 1975
- Helorus brethesi Ogloblin, 1928
- Helorus celebensis Achterberg, 2006
- Helorus elgoni Risbec, 1950
- Helorus nigripes Foerster, 1856
- Helorus niuginiae Naumann, 1983
- Helorus ruficornis Förster, 1856
- Helorus striolatus Cameron, 1906
- Helorus suwai Kusigemati, 1987
- Helorus yezoensis Kusigemati, 1987
- † Helorus arturi Muona, 2020
- † Helorus festivus Statz, 1938
