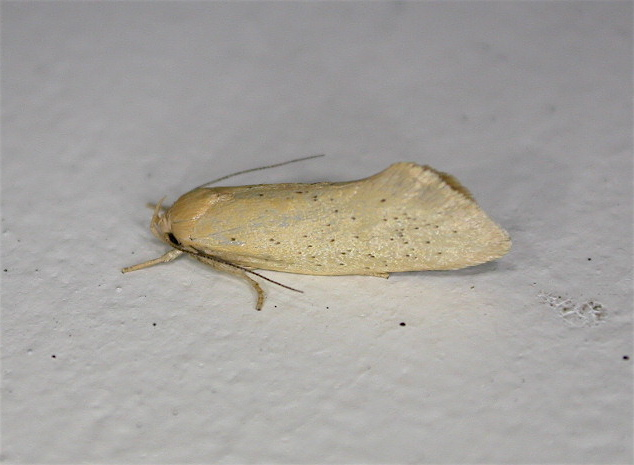

Scientific classification
- Kingdom: Animalia
- Phylum: Arthropoda
- Class: Insecta
- Order: Lepidoptera
- Family: Oecophoridae
- Genus: Tingena
- Species: T. armigerella

Binomial name
- Tingena armigerella (Walker, 1864)

Synonyms
- Oecophora armigerella Walker, 1864; Borkhausenia armigerella (Walker, 1864); Tingena bifaciella Walker, 1864; Borkhausenia bifaciella (Walker, 1864)

= Tingena armigerella =

Species of moth, endemic to New Zealand

Tingena armigerella is a species of moth in the family Oecophoridae. T. armigerella is endemic to New Zealand where it is found in the North Island. The larvae of this species feed on plant litter. It is parasitised by the parasitic wasp Fustiserphus intrudens.

== Taxonomy ==
It was described by Francis Walker in 1864 and named Oecophora armigerella. In 1915 Edward Meyrick placed this species within the Borkhausenia genus. George Hudson discussed and illustrated this species in his 1928 book The butterflies and moths of New Zealand under the name Borkhausenia armigerella. In 1988 John S. Dugdale assigned this species to the genus Tingena. In the same publication Dugdale also synonymised Tingena bifaciella with this species. The holotype specimen, collected in Auckland, is held at the Natural History Museum, London. In 2004 the phylogenetic relationship of this species to similar species was studied.

== Description ==
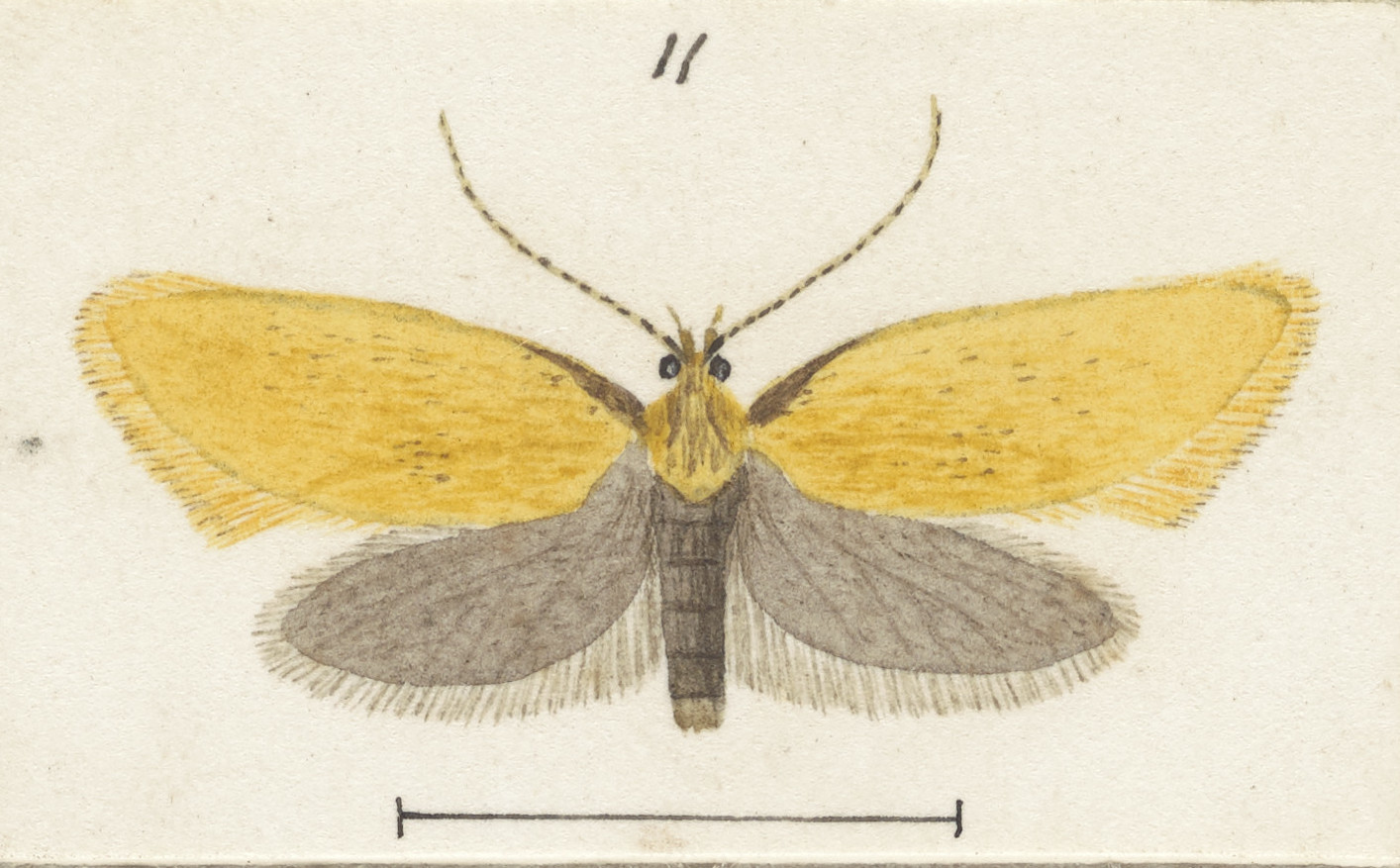
Illustration by George Hudson.

The larvae of this species are dark brown coloured.

The male adult was described by Walker as follows:

Male. Gilded yellow. Palpi nearly twice longer than the breadth of the head; second joint much curved; third shorter than the second. Abdomen, hind wings and under side blackish cinereous. Abdomen extending a little beyond the hind wings. Hind tibiae fringed. Fore wings moderately broad, hardly acute, with many minute blackish points; costa blackish towards the base. Hind wings blackish. Length of the body 3 lines; of the wings 10 lines.

The forewing length of the species is between 7.5 and 10 mm. Although there are several other endemic to New Zealand moth species that resemble T. armigerella, this moth can be distinguished from most others by the smattering of dark scales on its mainly yellow forewings.

== Distribution ==
This species is endemic to New Zealand. It is found throughout the North Island. It is visually very similar to other yellow species of moth but differs from many of these as it has noticeable dark scales on its wings. It has been hypothesised that observations of T. armigerella in the South Island result from misidentification with these visually similar yellow species.

== Habitat and hosts ==
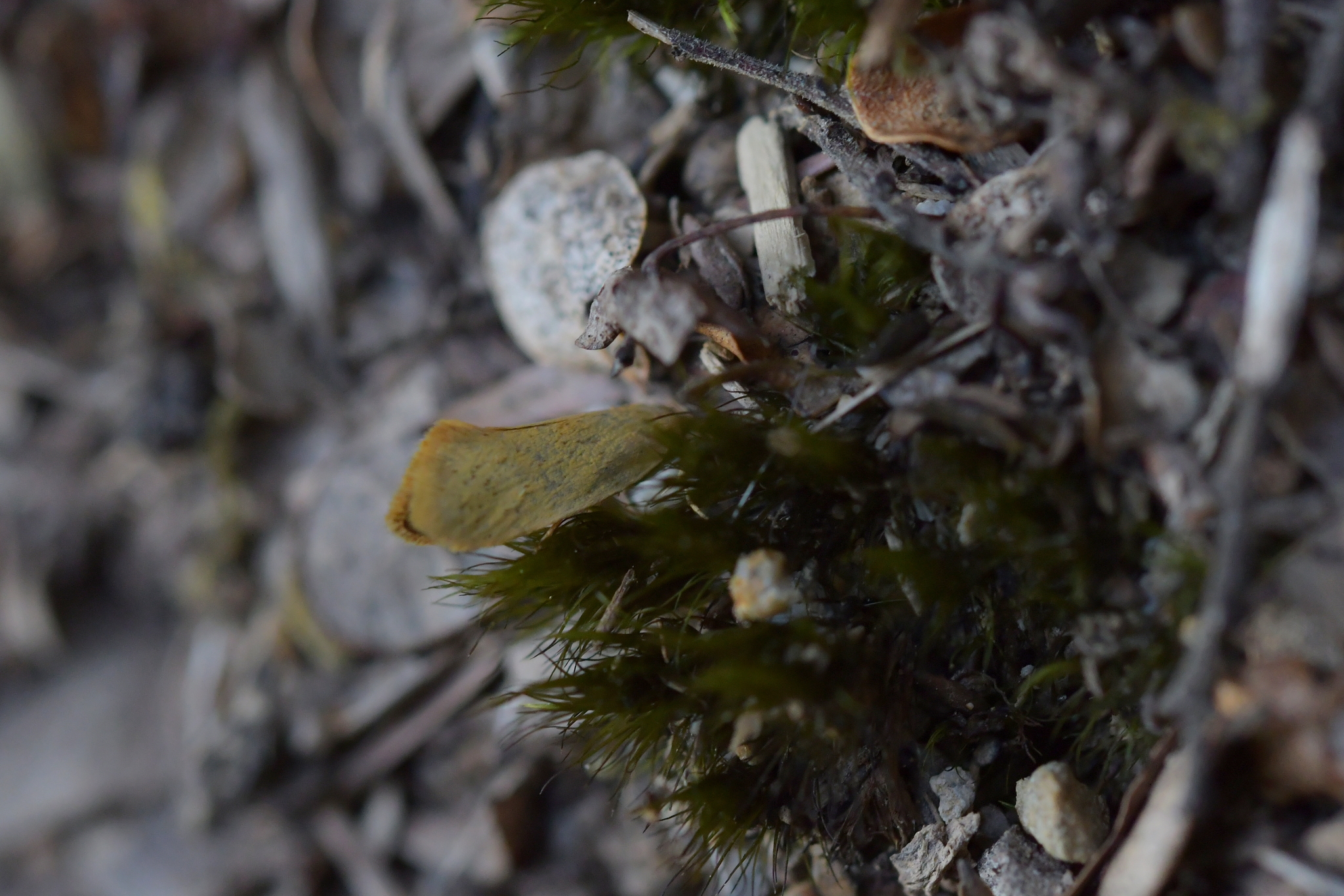
T. armigerella

This species inhabits native forest. Larvae feed on plant litter found in Nothofagaceae forest. The larvae are found in between the upper layer of dry loose leaves and the lower layer of compacted moist soil. They live in a shelter they construct with their silk, tying two dead leaves together. The larvae then feed from this shelter.

== Behaviour ==
The adults of this species are on the wing from October to February. They prefer to rest on tree trunks or fences and when disturbed, fall to the ground and seeks shelter in crevices or alternatively rests on their back with wings closed. They are nocturnal and are attracted to light.

== Enemies ==
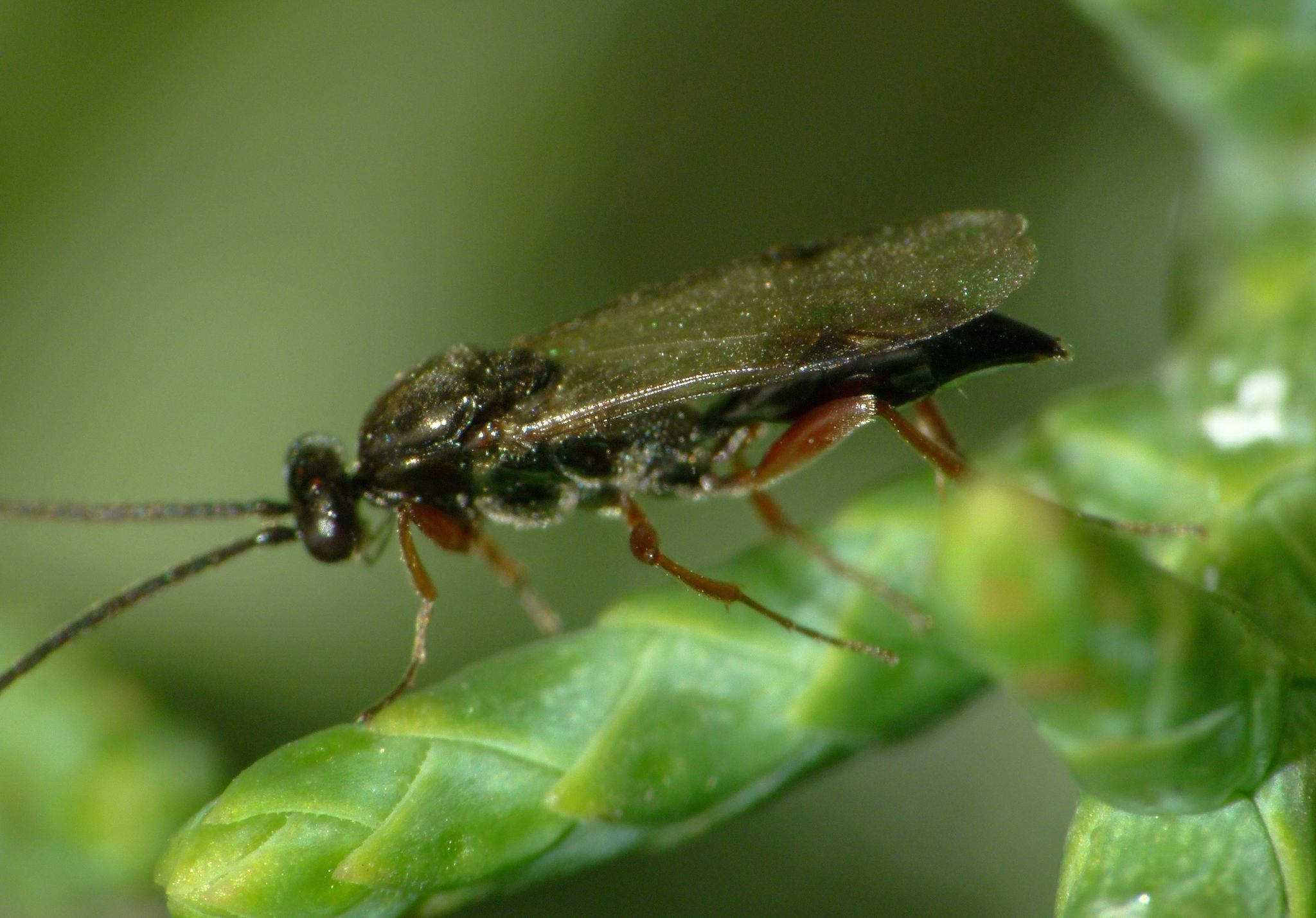
Parasitic wasp Fustiserphus intrudens

The parasitic wasp Fustiserphus intrudens parasitises the larvae of this species.
