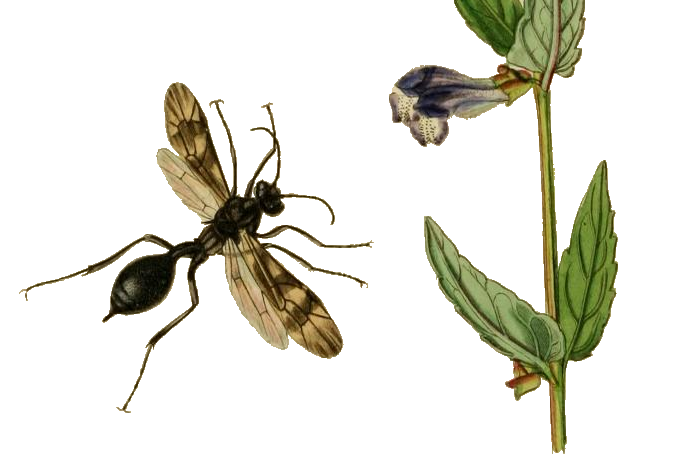
- An illustration from British Entomology by John Curtis.Agriotypus armatus the Spined Agriotypus

Scientific classification
- Domain: Eukaryota
- Kingdom: Animalia
- Phylum: Arthropoda
- Class: Insecta
- Order: Hymenoptera
- Family: Ichneumonidae
- Subfamily: Agriotypinae
- Genus: Agriotypus; Curtis, 1832

= Agriotypus =

Genus of wasps

Agriotypus is a genus of insect belonging to the family Ichneumonidae first described by John Curtis in 1832.

== Species ==
- Agriotypus armatus Curtis, 1832
- Agriotypus changbaishanus Chao, 1981
- Agriotypus chaoi Bennett, 2001
- Agriotypus dui Tang, He & Chen, 2022
- Agriotypus gracilis Waterston, 1930
- Agriotypus himalensis Mason, 1971
- Agriotypus jilinensis Chao, 1981
- Agriotypus kambaitensis Gupta & Chandra, 1975
- Agriotypus lui Chao, 1986
- Agriotypus maae Tang, He & Chen, 2022
- Agriotypus maculiceps Chao, 1992
- Agriotypus masneri Bennett, 2001
- Agriotypus morsei Tang, He & Chen, 2022
- Agriotypus silvestris Konishi & Aoyagi, 1994
- Agriotypus succinctus (Chao, 1992)
- Agriotypus taishunensis Tang, He & Chen, 2022
- Agriotypus tangi Chao, 1992
- Agriotypus townesi Chiu, 1986
- Agriotypus wangpiensis 2024
- Agriotypus yangae Tang, He & Chen, 2022
- Agriotypus zhejiangensis He & Chen, 1997
- Agriotypus zhengi He & Chen, 1991
