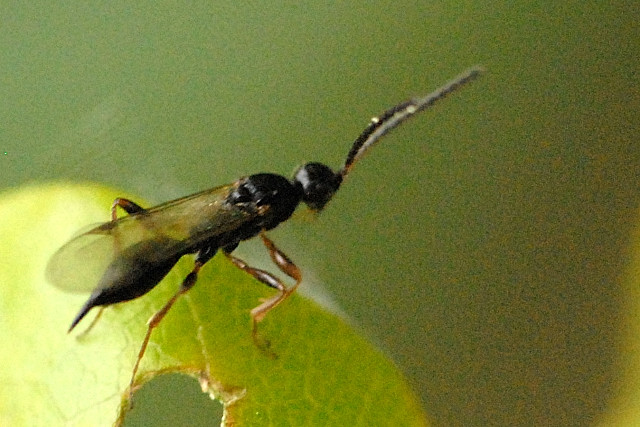

Scientific classification
- Kingdom: Animalia
- Phylum: Arthropoda
- Class: Insecta
- Order: Hymenoptera
- Family: Proctotrupidae
- Genus: Exallonyx; Kieffer, 1904

= Exallonyx =

Genus of wasps

Exallonyx is a genus of hymenopterans in the family Proctotrupidae. There are at least 20 described species in Exallonyx.

== Species ==
- Exallonyx angulatus Townes, 1981^{g}
- Exallonyx ater (Gravenhorst, 1807)^{g}
- Exallonyx brevicornis (Haliday, 1839)^{g}
- Exallonyx brevimala Townes, 1981^{g}
- Exallonyx certus Townes, 1981^{g}
- Exallonyx chiuae Townes, 1981^{g}
- Exallonyx confusus (Nixon, 1938)^{g}
- Exallonyx crenicornis (Nees, 1934)^{g}
- Exallonyx formicarius Kieffer, 1904^{g}
- Exallonyx grandis Brues, 1919^{b}
- Exallonyx leviventris Kieffer, 1908^{g}
- Exallonyx ligatus (Nees, 1834)^{g}
- Exallonyx longicornis (Nees, 1834)^{g}
- Exallonyx microcerus Kieffer, 1908^{g}
- Exallonyx microstylus Kieffer, 1908^{g}
- Exallonyx minor Townes, 1981^{g}
- Exallonyx nixoni Townes, 1981^{g}
- Exallonyx pallidistigma Morley, 1922^{g}
- Exallonyx quadriceps (Ashmead, 1893)^{g}
- Exallonyx subserratus Kieffer, 1908^{g}
- Exallonyx trichomus Townes, 1981^{g}
- Exallonyx trifoveatus Kieffer, 1908^{c g}
- Exallonyx wasmanni Kieffer, 1904^{g}

Data sources: i = ITIS, c = Catalogue of Life, g = GBIF, b = Bugguide.net
