= Vanhornia eucnemidarum =

Scientific classification
- Kingdom: Animalia
- Phylum: Arthropoda
- Class: Insecta
- Order: Hymenoptera
- Family: Vanhorniidae
- Genus: Vanhornia
- Species: V. eucnemidarum

Binomial name
- Vanhornia eucnemidarum Crawford, 1909

Species of wasp

Vanhornia eucnemidarum is a species of wasp in the family Vanhorniidae.
