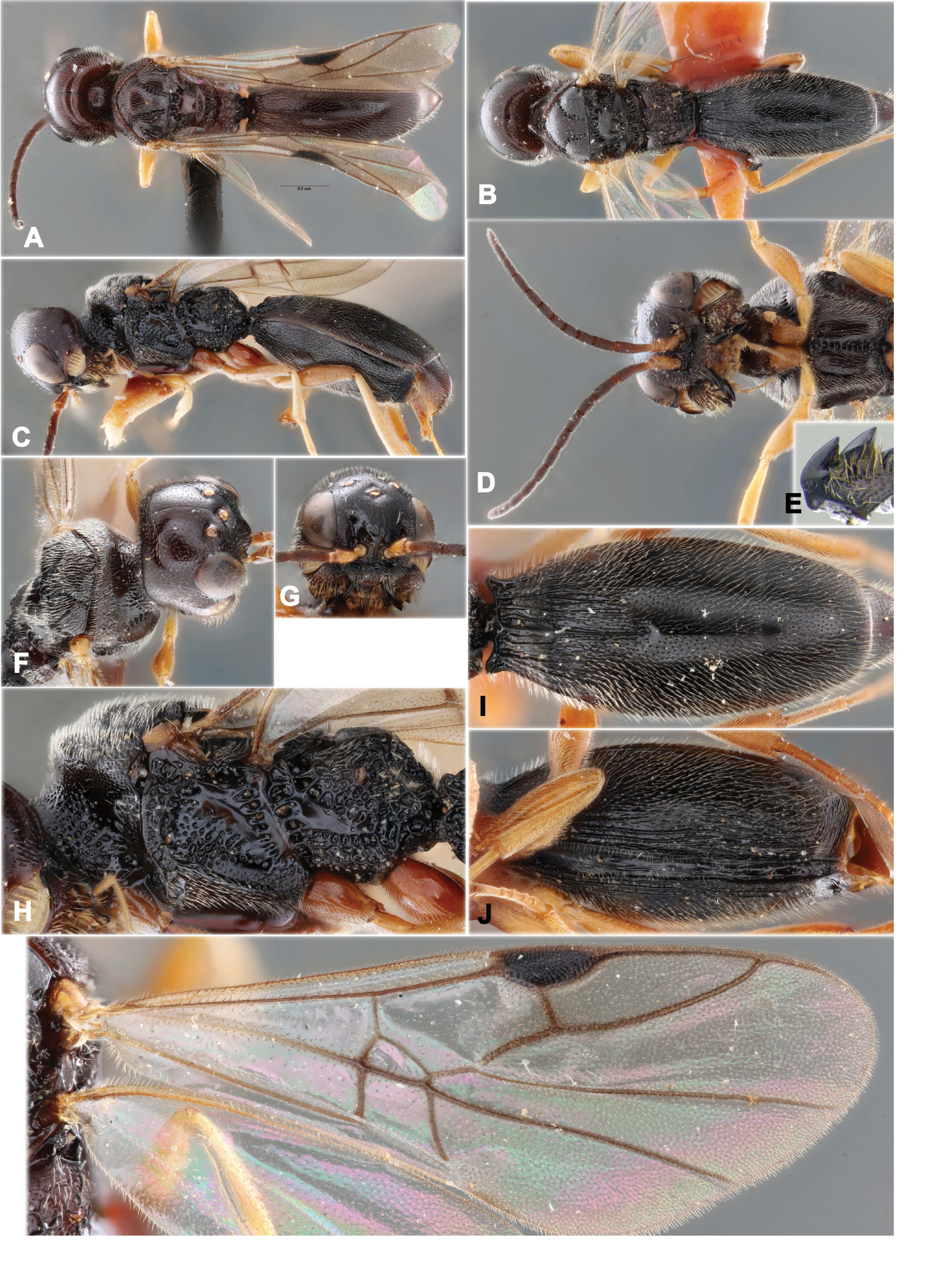
- Vanhornia eucnemidarum

Scientific classification
- Kingdom: Animalia
- Phylum: Arthropoda
- Class: Insecta
- Order: Hymenoptera
- Suborder: Apocrita
- Infraorder: Proctotrupomorpha
- Superfamily: Proctotrupoidea
- Family: Vanhorniidae; Crawford, 1909
- Genus: Vanhornia; Crawford, 1909

Synonyms
- Sinicivanhornia He & Chu, 1990

= Vanhornia =

Genus of wasps

Vanhornia is a genus of parasitic wasps. It is the only member of the family Vanhorniidae within the Proctotrupoidea. Of the four known species, V. eucnemidarum (type) is widespread across North America, V. leileri is widespread across the Palearctic, V. quizhouensis is found in South China and Thailand, and V. yurii is found in Northeast Asia. Members of Vanhornia are parasitoids on beetles belonging to the family Eucnemidae.

== Species ==
- Vanhornia eucnemidarum Crawford, 1909
- Vanhornia leileri Hedqvist, 1976
- Vanhornia quizhouensis (He & Chu 1990)
- Vanhornia yurii Timokhov & Belokobylskij, 2020
