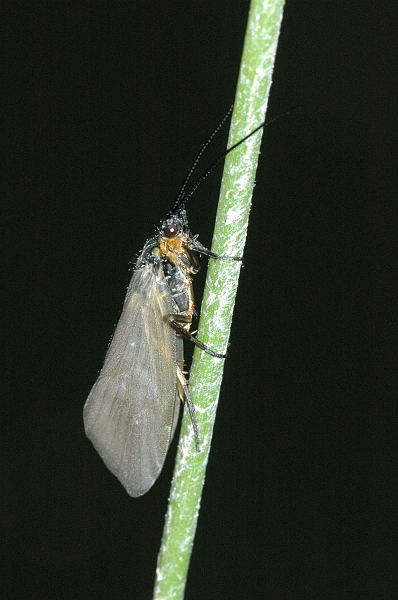
- Silo nigricornis - Picture taken in Commanster, Belgian High Ardennes .

Scientific classification
- Kingdom: Animalia
- Phylum: Arthropoda
- Clade: Pancrustacea
- Class: Insecta
- Order: Trichoptera
- Family: Goeridae
- Subfamily: Goerinae
- Genus: Silo; Curtis, 1830

= Silo (insect) =

Genus of caddisflies

Silo is a genus of caddisflies in the family Goeridae. There are about 11 described species in Silo.

== Species ==
- Silo alupkensis Martynov, 1917
- Silo chrisiammos Malicky, 1984
- Silo duplex Hagen, 1964
- Silo graellsii Pictet, 1865
- Silo mediterraneus McLachlan, 1884
- Silo nigricornis (Pictet, 1834)
- Silo pallipes (Fabricius, 1781)
- Silo piceus (Brauer, 1857)
- Silo proximus Martynov, 1913
- Silo rufescens (Rambur, 1842)
- Silo tuberculatus Martynov, 1909
