= Lithax =

Scientific classification
- Kingdom: Animalia
- Phylum: Arthropoda
- Clade: Pancrustacea
- Class: Insecta
- Order: Trichoptera
- Family: Goeridae
- Genus: Lithax; McLachlan, 1876

Genus of insects

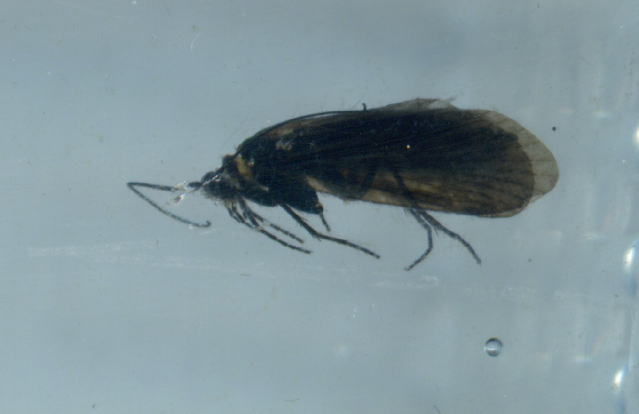
Lithax niger

Lithax is a genus of caddisflies belonging to the family Goeridae.

The species of this genus are found in Europe.

Species:

- Lithax atratula Ulmer, 1912
- Lithax herrlingi Wichard & Sukatsheva, 1992
