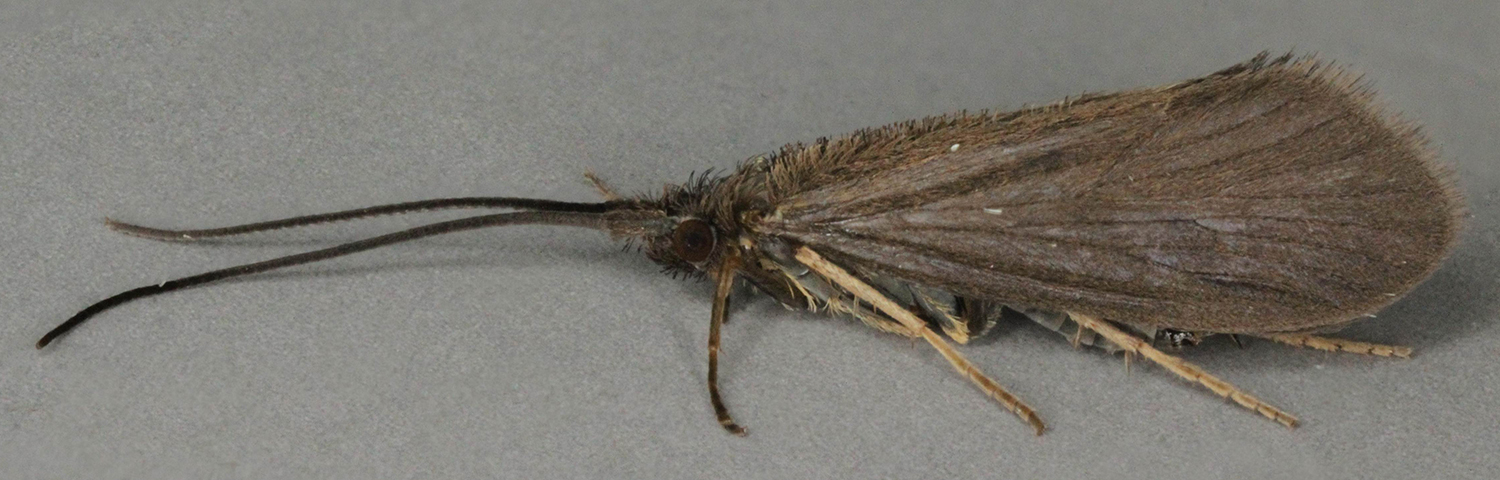
- Male specimen of S. pallipes

Scientific classification
- Kingdom: Animalia
- Phylum: Arthropoda
- Class: Insecta
- Order: Trichoptera
- Family: Goeridae
- Genus: Silo
- Species: S. pallipes

Binomial name
- Silo pallipes (Fabricius, 1781)

Synonyms
- Phryganea pallipes Fabricius, 1781

= Silo pallipes =

Species of caddisfly

Silo pallipes is a species of caddisfly found in rocky streams and rivers throughout Europe. Its life cycle lasts a year.
