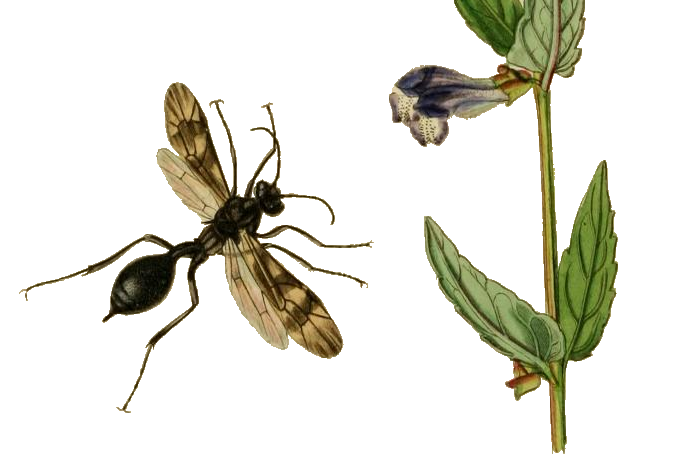

Scientific classification
- Domain: Eukaryota
- Kingdom: Animalia
- Phylum: Arthropoda
- Class: Insecta
- Order: Hymenoptera
- Family: Ichneumonidae
- Genus: Agriotypus
- Species: A. armatus

Binomial name
- Agriotypus armatus Curtis, 1832

= Agriotypus armatus =

Species of wasp

Agriotypus armatus is a species of insect belonging to the family Ichneumonidae. This is an aquatic idiobiont ectoparasitoid of Trichoptera pupae.

It is native to Europe and Russian Far East.
