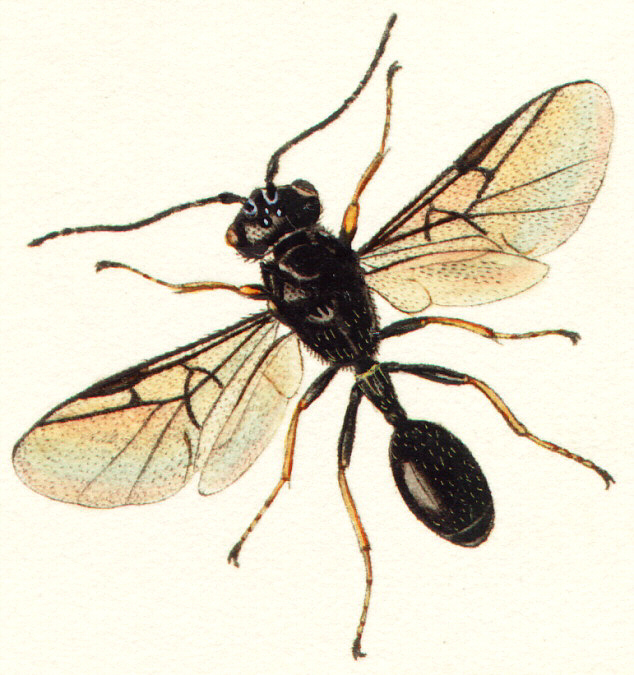
- Helorus anomalipes

Scientific classification
- Kingdom: Animalia
- Phylum: Arthropoda
- Clade: Pancrustacea
- Class: Insecta
- Order: Hymenoptera
- Superfamily: Proctotrupoidea
- Family: Heloridae; Förster, 1856

= Heloridae =

Heloridae Temporal range: Middle Jurassic–Recent

Family of wasps

Heloridae is a family of parasitic wasps in the superfamily Proctotrupoidea, known primarily from fossils, and only one extant genus, Helorus, with 12 species found worldwide. Members of Helorus are parasitic on green lacewings.

== Genera ==
- †Archaeohelorus Daohugou, China, Middle Jurassic (Callovian)
- †Bellohelorus Li et al. 2017 Yixian Formation, China, Early Cretaceous (Aptian)
- †Conohelorus Turga, Russia, Early Cretaceous (Aptian)
- Helorus Latreille, 1802 (12 spp. worldwide)
- †Korehelorus Rosse-Guillevic, Rasnitsyn, Nam, & Jouault, 2023 Jinju Formation, South Korea, Early Cretaceous (Albian)
- †Laiyanghelorus Zhang 1992 Laiyang Formation, Yixian Formation, China, Early Cretaceous (Aptian)
- †Liaoropronia Zhang and Zhang 2001 Yixian Formation, China, Early Cretaceous (Aptian)
- †Novhelorus Li et al. 2017 Yixian Formation, China, Early Cretaceous (Aptian)
- †Obconohelorus Rasnitsyn 1990 Turga, Russia, Early Cretaceous (Aptian)
- †Protocyrtus Karabastau Formation, Kazakhstan, Middle-Late Jurassic (Callovian/Oxfordian) Gurvan-Eren Formation, Mongolia Yixian Formation, China, Turga, Russia, Early Cretaceous (Aptian)
- †Sinohelorus Shi et al. 2013 Yixian Formation, China, Early Cretaceous (Aptian)
- †Sinuijuhelorus Jon et al. 2019 Sinuiju Formation, North Korea, Early Cretaceous (Aptian)
- †Spherogaster Zhang and Zhang 2001 Yixian Formation, China, Early Cretaceous (Aptian)
