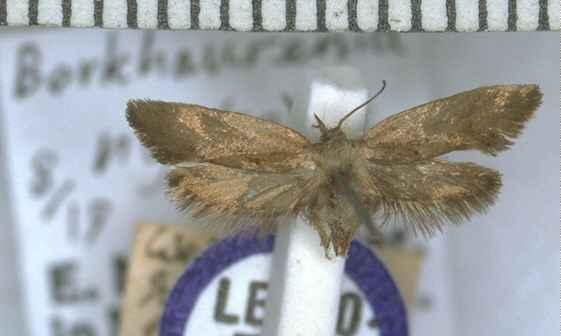
- Male lectotype

Scientific classification
- Kingdom: Animalia
- Phylum: Arthropoda
- Class: Insecta
- Order: Lepidoptera
- Family: Oecophoridae
- Genus: Tingena
- Species: T. nycteris

Binomial name
- Tingena nycteris (Meyrick, 1890)

Synonyms
- Oecophora nycteris Meyrick, 1890; Borkhausenia nycteris (Meyrick, 1890)

= Tingena nycteris =

Species of moth, endemic to New Zealand

Tingena nycteris is a species of moth in the family Oecophoridae. It is endemic to New Zealand and has been observed in the North and South Islands. This species inhabits native forest and scrubland and adults are on the wing from October to January.

== Taxonomy ==
This species was described by Edward Meyrick in 1890 using specimens collected by George Hudson in Wellington in November and named Oecophora nycteris. In 1915 Meyrick discussed this species under the name Borkhausenia nycteris. In 1926 Alfred Philpott discussed and illustrated the genitalia of the male of this species. In 1928 George Hudson also discussed and illustrated this species in his book The butterflies and moths of New Zealand. In 1988 J. S. Dugdale placed this species within the genus Tingena. The male lectotype is held at the Natural History Museum, London.

== Description ==
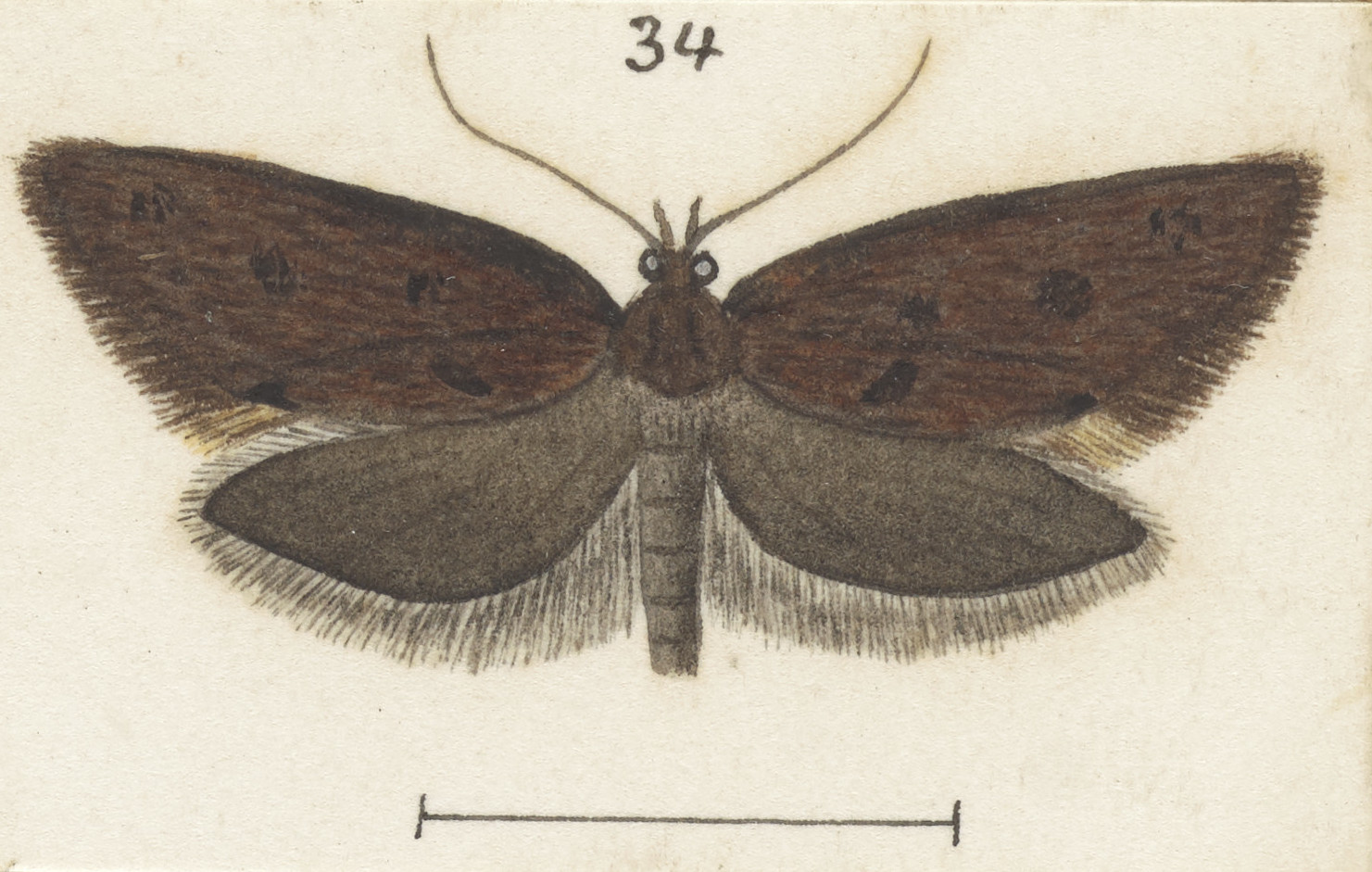
Male T. nycteris illustrated by George Hudson.

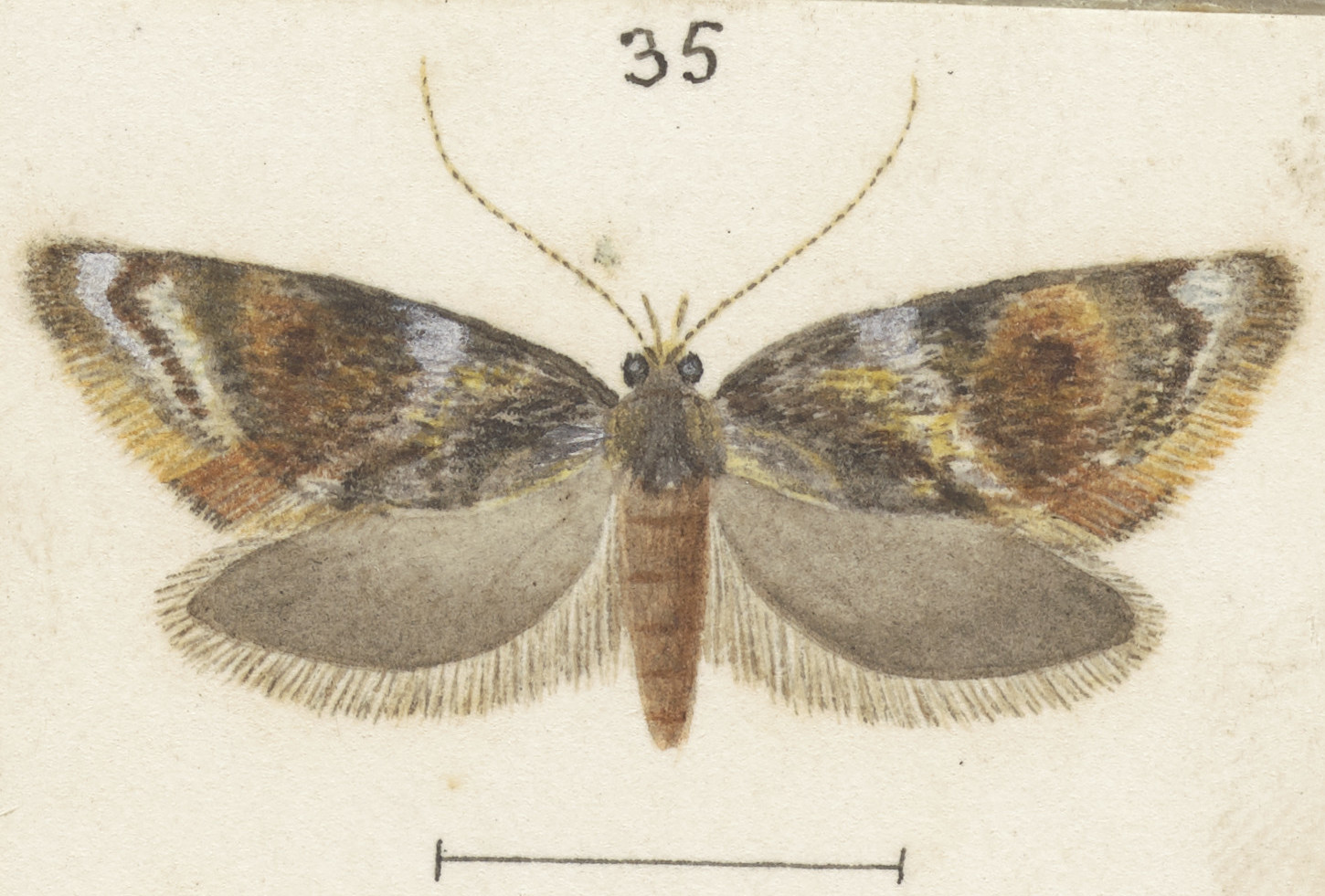
Female T. nycteris illustrated by George Hudson.

Meyrick described this species as follows:

♂♀. 14mm. Head, palpi, antennae, thorax, abdomen, and legs dark fuscous; face pale greyish-ochreous; palpi with second joint rough-scaled beneath; posterior tarsi ringed with pale-ochreous. Forewings elongate, costa moderately arched, apex pointed, hindmargin very obliquely rounded; rather dark bronzy-fuscous; a cloudy darker transverse mark at anal angle, reaching half across wing: cilia dark bronzy-fuscous. Hindwings dark fuscous, somewhat lighter towards base; cilia dark fuscous.

Hudson pointed out that this species is considerably variable and suggested that the North Island form of this species may possibly be a distinct species. Hudson states that the males of this species are paler and smaller in the North Island in comparison to the males found in the South Island. The female also varies in colour sometimes dark brown like the male others are paler with variegated colour.

== Distribution ==
This species is endemic to New Zealand and has been observed in Wellington, Otira River, Wyndham, Riverton, Dunedin and Invercargill.

== Behaviour ==
The adults of this species are on the wing from October to January.

== Habitat ==
This species inhabits open native forest and scrubland.

== Enemies ==
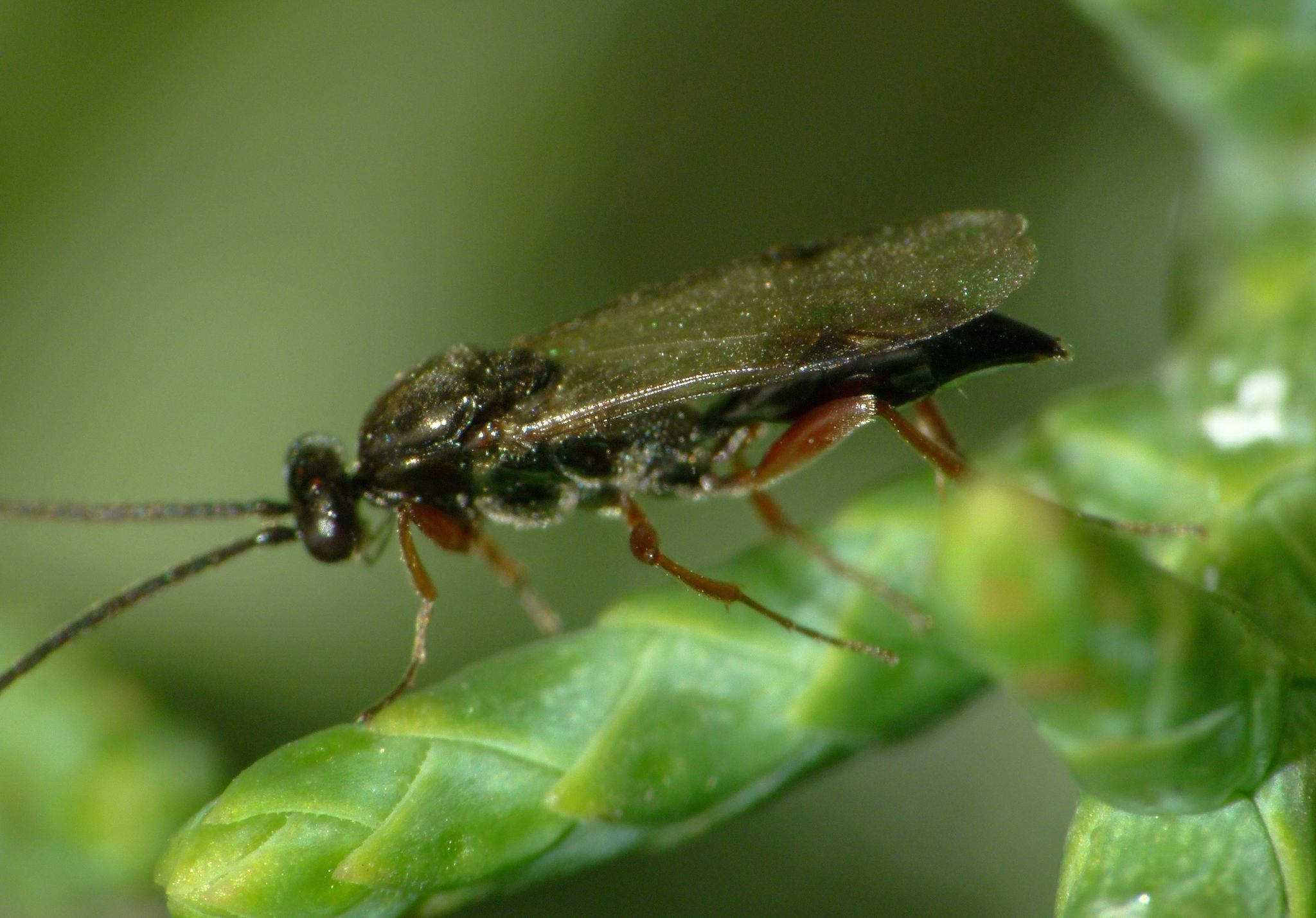
Fustiserphus intrudens

The larvae of T. nycteris play host to the parasitic fly Fustiserphus intrudens.
