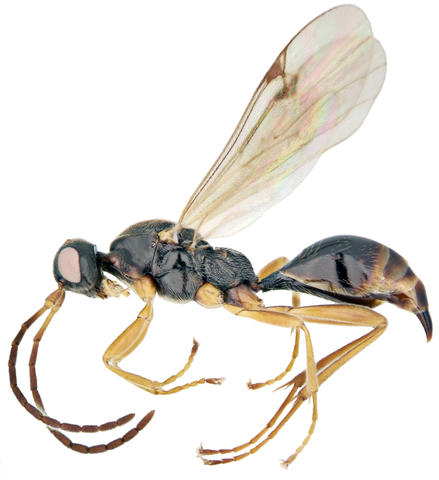
- Codrus picicornis

Scientific classification
- Kingdom: Animalia
- Phylum: Arthropoda
- Class: Insecta
- Order: Hymenoptera
- Suborder: Apocrita
- Infraorder: Proctotrupomorpha
- Superfamily: Proctotrupoidea
- Family: Proctotrupidae; Latreille, 1802

Synonyms
- Proctotrypidae

= Proctotrupidae =

Proctotrupidae Temporal range: Berriasian–Recent

Family of wasps

Proctotrupidae is a family of parasitic wasps in the superfamily Proctotrupoidea. There are about 400 species in more than 30 genera in Proctotrupidae, found throughout most of the world.

Proctotrupidae are small parasitoid wasps, that primarily parasitise larvae of beetles belonging to the families Carabidae, Staphylinidae, and Elateridae, though a number of species are known to target other hosts, including fungus gnats (Mycetophilidae, Sciaridae) and concealer moths. Females in many species are wingless and dwell in the soil, where they are capable of detecting beetle larvae in their burrows. They typically have a body length of 5 to 8 mm, but species may range from 3 to 15 mm.

== Genera ==
Subfamily Heloriserphinae Engel, Herhold, & Barden, 2022

- Heloriserphus Masner, 1981

Subfamily †Astarteserphinae Engel, Herhold, & Barden, 2022

- †Astarteserphus Engel, Herhold, & Barden, 2022 Lebanese amber Early Cretaceous (Barremian)

Subfamily Austroserphinae Kozlov, 1970

- Austroserphus Dodd, 1933

Subfamily Proctotrupinae Latreille, 1802

tribe Disogmini Kozlov, 1970

- †Cresogmus Rasnitsyn & Kolyada, 2022 Burmese amber, Myanmar, Late Cretaceous (Cenomanian)
- Disogmus Förster, 1856

tribe Cryptoserphini Kozlov, 1970 (=Nothoserphini Kozlov, 1970)

- Brachyserphus Hellèn, 1941
- Cryptocodrus Pschorn-Walcher
- Cryptoserphus Kieffer, 1907
- Hormoserphus Townes & Townes, 1981
- Maaserphus Lin, 1988
- Mischoserphus Townes & Townes, 1981
- Nothoserphus Brues, 1940
- Oxyserphus Masner, 1961
- Phoxoserphus Lin, 1988
- Thomsonina Hellèn, 1941
- Watanabeia Masner, 1958

tribe Proctotrupini Latreille, 1802

- Acanthoserphus Dodd, 1915
- Afroserphus Masner, 1961
- Apoglypha Townes & Townes, 1981
- Austrocodrus Ogloblin, 1960
- Carinaserphus He & Xu, 2007
- Codrus Panzer
- Elgonia Risbec, 1950
- Exallonyx Kieffer, 1904
- Fustiserphus Townes & Townes, 1981
- Glyptoserphus Fan & He, 1993
- Paracodrus Kieffer, 1907
- Parthenocodrus Pschorn-Walcher, 1958
- Phaenoserphus Kieffer, 1908
- Phaneroserphus Pschorn-Walcher, 1958
- Proctotrupes Latreille, 1802
- Pschornia Townes & Townes, 1981
- Serphonostus Townes & Townes, 1981
- Sminthoserphus Townes & Townes, 1981
- Trachyserphus Kolyada, 2017
- Tretoserphus Townes & Townes, 1981

Incertae sedis

- †Dintonia Rasnitsyn & Jarzembowski 1998 Purbeck Group, England, Early Cretaceous (Berriasian)
- †Gurvanotrupes Rasnitsyn, 1986 Gurvan-Eren, Mongolia, Yixian Formation, China, Early Cretaceous (Barremian-Aptian)
- †Pallenites Rasnitsyn & Jarzembowski 1998 Purbeck Group, England, Early Cretaceous (Berriasian)
- †Peverella Rasnitsyn & Jarzembowski 1998 Purbeck Group, England, Early Cretaceous (Berriasian)
- †Protoprocto Sharkey, 1990 Crato Formation, Brazil, Early Cretaceous (Aptian)
