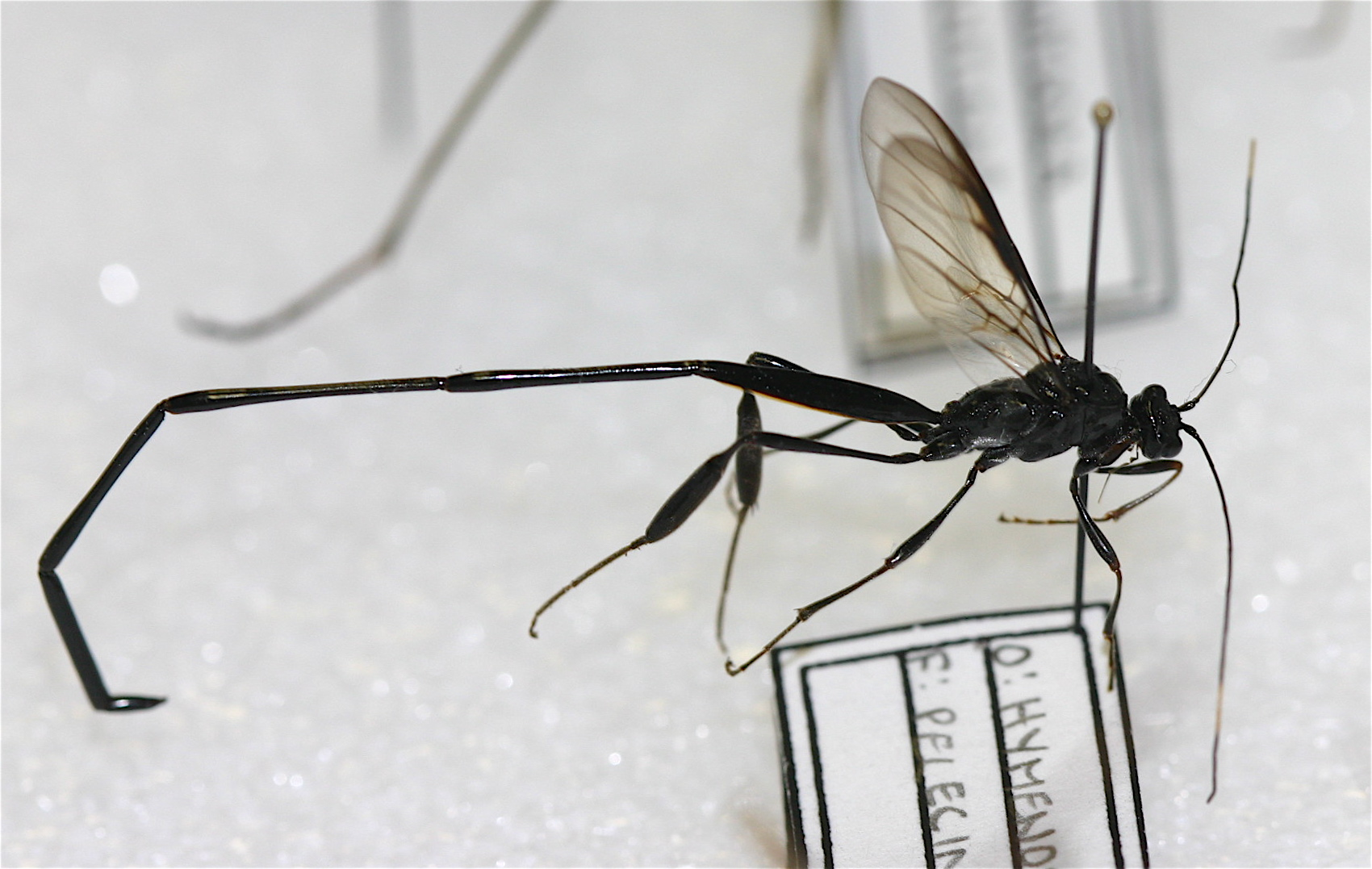
- Pelecinus polyturator

Scientific classification
- Kingdom: Animalia
- Phylum: Arthropoda
- Clade: Pancrustacea
- Class: Insecta
- Order: Hymenoptera
- Superfamily: Proctotrupoidea
- Family: Pelecinidae; Haliday 1840

Genera
- See text

= Pelecinidae =

Pelecinidae Temporal range: Callovian–Recent

Family of insects

Pelecinidae is a family of parasitic wasps in the superfamily Proctotrupoidea. It contains only one living genus, Pelecinus, with three species known from the Americas. The earliest fossil species are known from the Jurassic, and the group was highly diverse during the Cretaceous. Members of Pelecinus are parasitic on larval beetles, flies, green lacewings, and sawflies.

== Taxonomy ==
- Pelecinus present
- †Ampluspelecinus Uchida, 2024 Burmese amber, Myanmar, Late Cretaceous (Cenomanian)
- †Abropelecinus Feng et al. 2010 Yixian Formation, China, Early Cretaceous (Aptian) Burmese amber, Myanmar, Late Cretaceous (Cenomanian)
- †Brachypelecinus Guo et al. 2016 Burmese amber, Myanmar, Late Cretaceous (Cenomanian)
- †Henopelecinus Engel and Grimaldi 2006 Engel and Grimaldi 2006 New Jersey amber, Late Cretaceous (Turonian)
- †Pelecinopteron Brues 1933 Baltic amber, Eocene
- †Phasmatopelecinus Greenwalt and Engel 2014 Kishenehn Formation, Montana, Eocene (Lutetian)
- †Shoushida Liu et al. 2009 Yixian Formation, China, Early Cretaceous (Aptian)
- †Stelepelecinus Guo et al. 2016 Yixian Formation, China, Early Cretaceous (Aptian)
- †Zoropelecinus Engel and Grimaldi 2013 Burmese amber, Myanmar, Late Cretaceous (Cenomanian)
- †Allopelecinus Zhang and Rasnitsyn 2006 Laiyang Formation, China, Early Cretaceous (Aptian)
- †Archaeopelecinus Shih et al. 2009 Daohugou, China, Middle Jurassic (Callovian)
- †Azygopelecinus Feng et al. 2010 Yixian Formation, China, Early Cretaceous (Aptian)
- †Cathaypelecinus Shih et al. 2009 Daohugou, China, Middle Jurassic (Callovian)
- †Eopelecinus Zhang et al. 2002 Tsagaantsav Formation, Mongolia, Early Cretaceous (Valanginian) Laiyang Formation, Yixian Formation, Jiufotang Formation, China, Early Cretaceous (Aptian), Zaza Formation, Russia Early Cretaceous (Aptian), Burmese amber, Myanmar, Late Cretaceous (Cenomanian)
- †Iscopinus Kozlov 1974 Zaza Formation, Russia Early Cretaceous (Aptian) Ola Formation, Russia, Late Cretaceous (Campanian)
- †Megapelecinus Shih et al. 2010 Yixian Formation, China, Early Cretaceous (Aptian)
- †Praescopinus Rasnitsyn 2008, Shar Teeg, Mongolia, Late Jurassic (Tithonian)
- †Scorpiopelecinus Zhang et al. 2002 Yixian Formation, China, Early Cretaceous (Aptian) Zaza Formation, Russia Early Cretaceous (Aptian)
- †Sinopelecinus Zhang et al. 2002 Laiyang Formation, Yixian Formation, China, Early Cretaceous (Aptian)
- †Protopelecinus Zhang and Rasnitsyn 2004 Dzun-Bain Formation, Mongolia Early Cretaceous (Aptian), Zaza Formation, Russia Early Cretaceous (Aptian)
