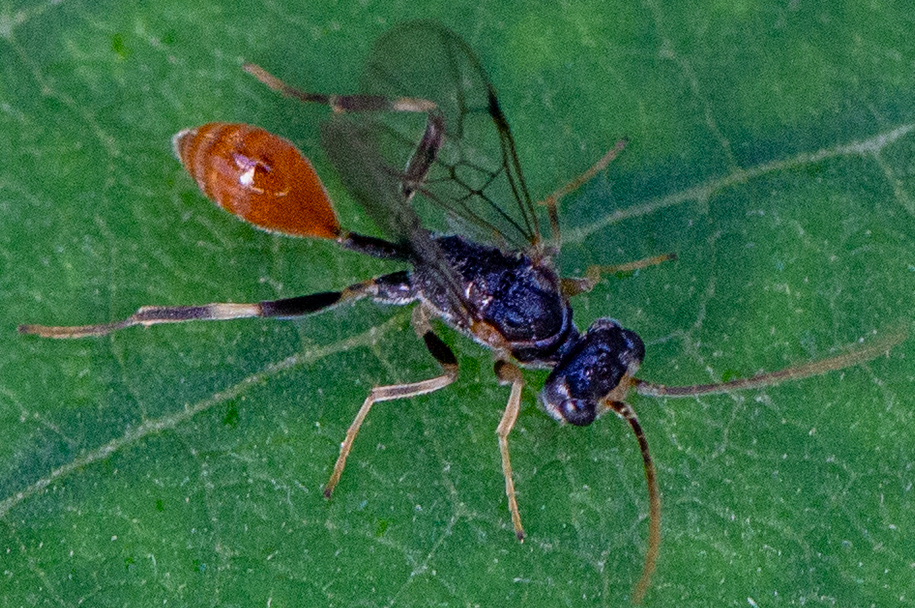
- Specimen of Ropronia sp. observed in Illinois

Scientific classification
- Kingdom: Animalia
- Phylum: Arthropoda
- Class: Insecta
- Order: Hymenoptera
- Superfamily: Proctotrupoidea
- Family: Roproniidae; Viereck 1916

= Roproniidae =

Roproniidae Temporal range: Callovian–Recent

Family of wasps

Roproniidae is a family of parasitic wasps in the superfamily Proctotrupoidea, of which only two genera are still extant, the others being fossils. Species are known from Eurasia and North America. At least some living species are known to parasitise the larvae of tenthredinid sawflies.

== Extant genera ==
- Ropronia Provancher, 1887 Asia, North America
- Xiphyropronia He & Chen, 1991 China

== Fossil genera ==
- † Beipiaosirex Hong, 1983 Haifanggou Formation, China, Middle Jurassic (Callovian)
- † Jeholoropronia Ren, 1995 Yixian Formation, China Early Cretaceous (Aptian)
- †Mesohelorus Martynov 1925 Haifanggou Formation, China, Middle Jurassic (Callovian), Karabastau Formation, Middle-Late Jurassic (Callovian/Oxfordian)
- † Mesoropronia Rasnitsyn, 1990 Turga, Russia, Early Cretaceous (Aptian)
- † Paleoropronia Garrouste et al., 2016 Menat Formation, France, Paleocene
- †Protohelorus Kozlov 1968 Karabastau Formation, Middle-Late Jurassic (Callovian/Oxfordian)
- †Phoriostephanus Engel & Huang, 2016 Burmese amber, Myanmar, Late Cretaceous (Cenomanian) (originally assigned to Stephanidae)
