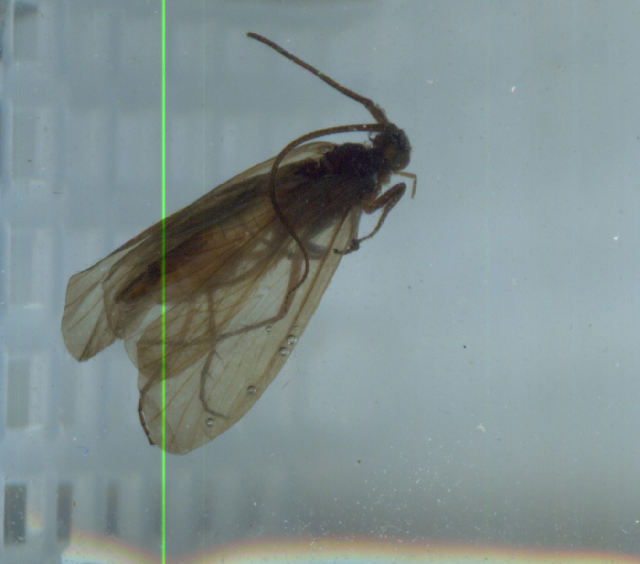
- Goera diversa

Scientific classification
- Kingdom: Animalia
- Phylum: Arthropoda
- Clade: Pancrustacea
- Class: Insecta
- Order: Trichoptera
- Family: Goeridae
- Subfamily: Goerinae
- Genus: Goera; Stephens, 1829

Type species
- Phryganea pilosa J.C. Fabricius

= Goera =

Genus of caddisflies

Goera is a genus of caddisflies in the family Goeridae. There are at least 120 described species in Goera.

== See also ==
- List of Goera species
