= Goeridae =

Scientific classification
- Kingdom: Animalia
- Phylum: Arthropoda
- Clade: Pancrustacea
- Class: Insecta
- Order: Trichoptera
- Superfamily: Limnephiloidea
- Family: Goeridae; Ulmer, 1903

Family of caddisflies

Goeridae is a family of caddisflies in the order Trichoptera. There are about 12 genera and at least 160 described species in Goeridae.

The type genus for Goeridae is Goera J.F. Stephens, 1829.

== Genera ==
- Archithremma Martynov, 1935
- Ashmira Mosely, 1939
- Gastrocentrella Ulmer, 1951
- Gastrocentrides Ulmer, 1930
- Goera Stephens, 1829 (little gray sedges)
- Goeracea Denning, 1968
- Goerita Ross, 1938
- Larcasia Navas, 1917
- Lepania Ross, 1941
- Lithax McLachlan, 1876
- Silo Curtis, 1830
- Silonella Fischer, 1966
