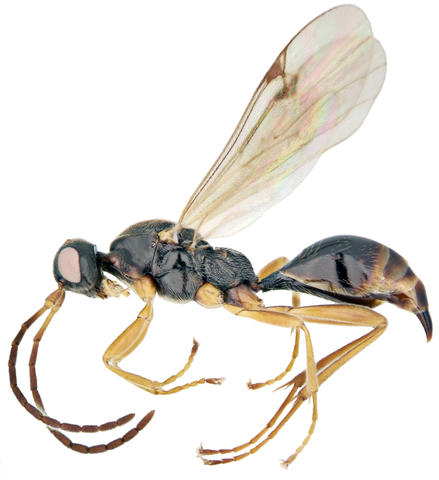
- Codrus picicornis

Scientific classification
- Kingdom: Animalia
- Phylum: Arthropoda
- Clade: Pancrustacea
- Class: Insecta
- Order: Hymenoptera
- Infraorder: Proctotrupomorpha
- Superfamily: Proctotrupoidea

Families
- Austroniidae; Heloridae; †Jurapriidae; †Mesoserphidae; Pelecinidae; †Peleserphidae; Peradeniidae; Proctorenyxidae; Proctotrupidae; Roproniidae; Vanhorniidae

= Proctotrupoidea =

Proctotrupoidea Temporal range: Middle Jurassic–Present

Superfamily of wasps

Proctotrupoidea is a hymenopteran superfamily containing seven extant families, though others have been recognized in the past, most of these having been removed to a recently erected superfamily Diaprioidea. Of the remaining families, only Proctotrupidae contains a substantial number of species, with over 400 described. The others are small, often relictual groups. See links for individual families for details of life history and diversity.

== See also ==
- Tree of Life Apocrita; shows polyphyletic Proctotrupoidea.
