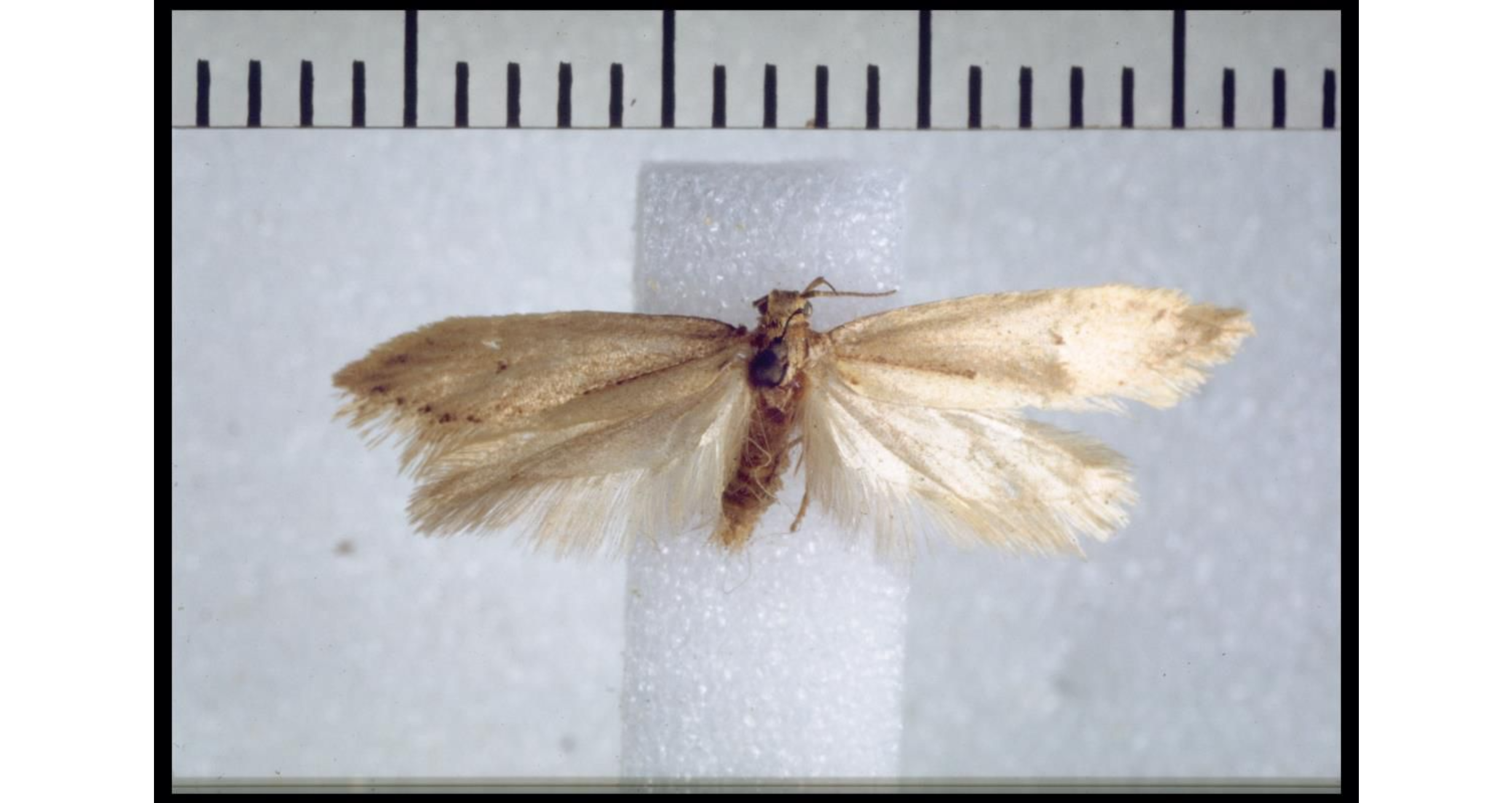
- Male holotype

Scientific classification
- Kingdom: Animalia
- Phylum: Arthropoda
- Class: Insecta
- Order: Lepidoptera
- Family: Oecophoridae
- Genus: Tingena
- Species: T. hastata

Binomial name
- Tingena hastata (Philpott, 1916)

Synonyms
- Borkhausenia hastata Philpott, 1916

= Tingena hastata =

Species of moth, endemic to New Zealand

Tingena hastata is a species of moth in the family Oecophoridae. It is endemic to New Zealand and has been observed in the southern part of the South Island. Adults of this species are on the wing in October.

== Taxonomy ==
This species was first described by Alfred Philpott in 1916 using a specimen collected at Seaward Moss (now known as part of Awarua Plains), near Invercargill, in October and named Borkhausenia hastata. George Hudson discussed and illustrated this species under the name B. hastata in his 1928 publication The butterflies and moths of New Zealand. In 1988 J. S. Dugdale placed this species within the genus Tingena. The male holotype is held in the New Zealand Arthropod Collection.

== Description ==
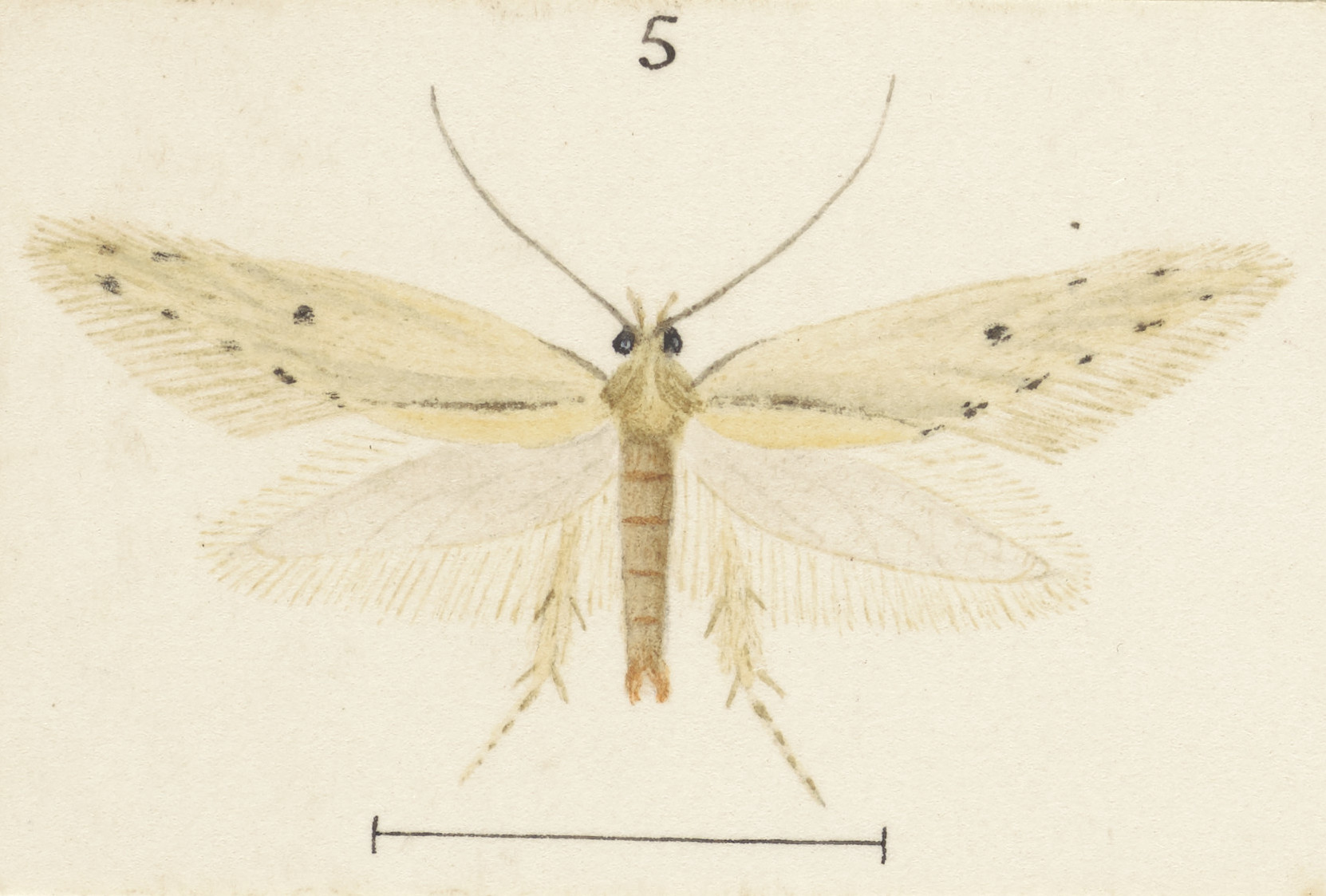
Illustration of T. hastata by George Hudson.

Philpott described this species as follows:

♂. 19 mm. Head and thorax whitish - ochreous. Palpi whitish-ochreous, mixed with purplish-brown beneath. Antennae whitish-ochreous, annulated with purplish-brown, ciliations 1. Abdomen ochreous-brown, tuft ochreous. Forewings elongate, costa moderately arched, apex produced, termen strongly oblique; whitish-ochreous; markings purplish-brown; an obscure streak from base along fold to 1/2; a dot above dorsum at base and one in disc at 2/3; a rather suffused series of spots along termen and some scales on costa near apex : cilia whitish-ochreous with some brownish scales near base. Hindwings and cilia shining white, ochreous tinged.

This species can be confused with T. chloradelpha but can be distinguished as T. hastata has narrower and more pointed forewings with greyer colouring and darker terminal and discal dots.

== Distribution ==
This species is endemic to New Zealand and has been observed in the southern parts of the South Island including at Gem Lake at an altitude of 1300 m.

== Behaviour ==
This species is on the wing in October.
