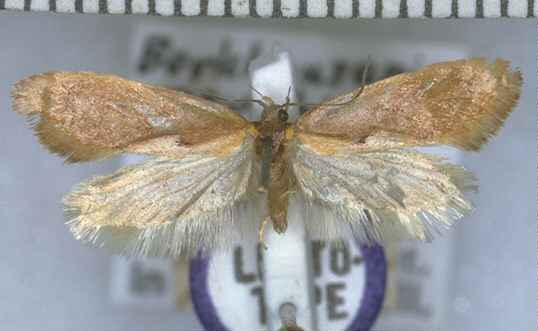
- Male lectotype

Scientific classification
- Kingdom: Animalia
- Phylum: Arthropoda
- Class: Insecta
- Order: Lepidoptera
- Family: Oecophoridae
- Genus: Tingena
- Species: T. perichlora

Binomial name
- Tingena perichlora (Meyrick, 1907)

Synonyms
- Borkhausenia perichlora Meyrick, 1907

= Tingena perichlora =

Species of moth, endemic to New Zealand

Tingena perichlora is a species of moth in the family Oecophoridae. It is endemic to New Zealand and has been observed in the southern parts of the South Island. This species appears to inhabit manuka scrub. Adults of this species are on the wing from October to January.

== Taxonomy ==
This species was first described by Edward Meyrick in 1907 using specimens collected by Alfred Philpott in Invercargill in November and December and named Borkhausenia perichlora. In 1915 Meyrick discussed this species under that name. In 1926 Alfred Philpott discussed and illustrated the genitalia of the male of this species and stated that he could not detect any difference in the genitalia between this species and T. chloradelpha. Philpott went on to hypothesise that the two species may possibly be the northern and southern varieties of the same species as they only show difference in colour characteristics. In 1928 George Hudson discussed and illustrated this species in his book The butterflies and moths of New Zealand. In 1988 J. S. Dugdale placed this species within the genus Tingena. The male lectotype is held at the Natural History Museum, London.

== Description ==
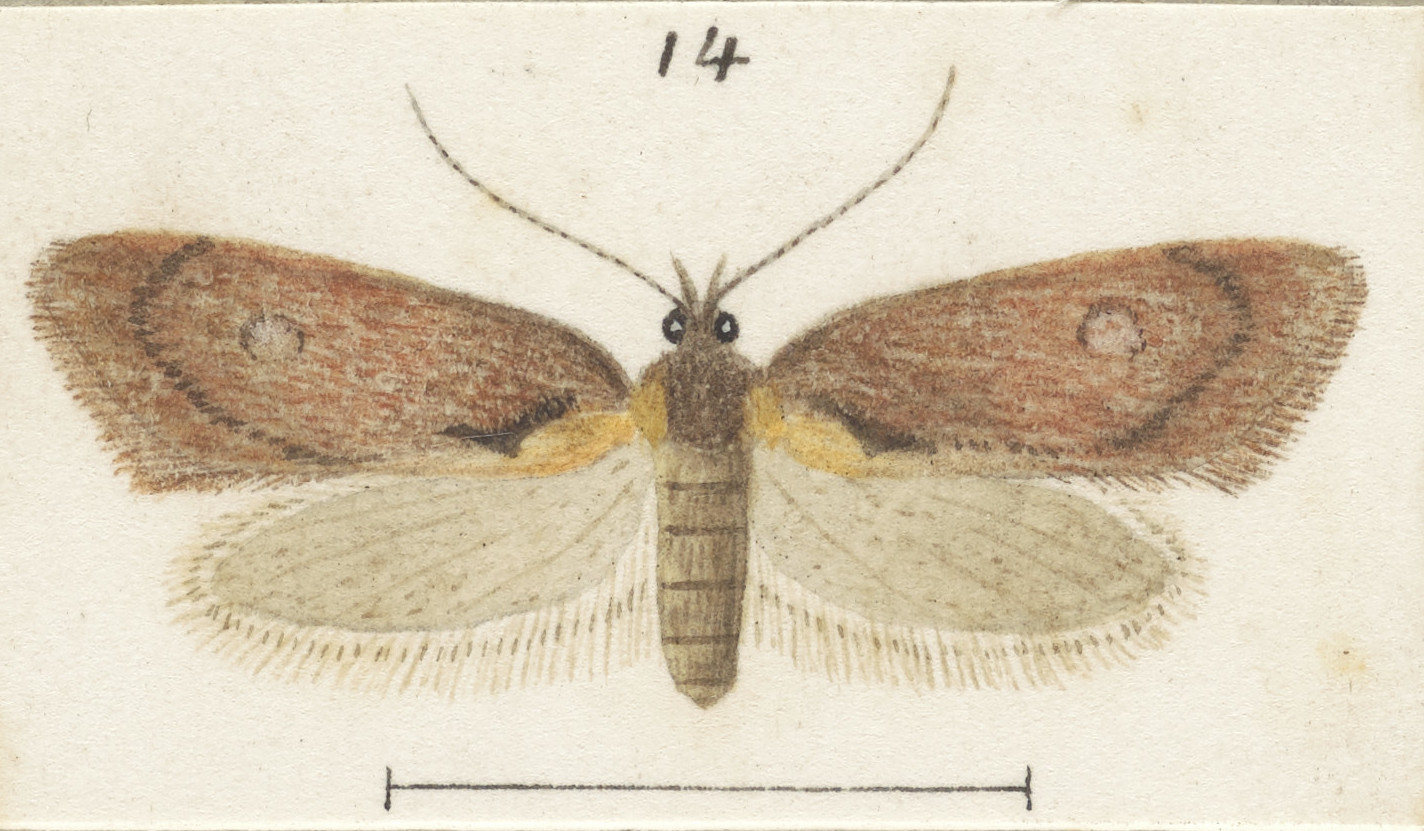
T. perichlora illustrated by George Hudson.

Meyrick described this species as follows:

♂. 21–22 mm. Head whitish-ochreous mixed with fuscous. Palpi whitish-ochreous, irrorated throughout with rather dark fuscous. Antennae dark fuscous. Thorax dark fuscous, apical half of patagia yellow-ochreous. Abdomen grey. Forewings elongate, costa gently arched, apex round-pointed, termen very obliquely rounded; ferruginous-brown, towards costa somewhat paler and more ochreous; a yellow-ochreous streak along dorsum from base to near tornus posteriorly whitish, upper edge triangularly indented before middle, with some blackish scales in indentation: cilia ferruginous-ochreous. Hindwings light grey, margins narrowly whitish; cilia whitish.

Hudson stated that this species has considerable variations in its markings with some specimens having less developing patterns.

== Distribution ==
This species is endemic to New Zealand and has been observed in southern parts of the South Island including Invercargill, Dunedin and the Hunter Mountains.

== Behaviour ==
The adults of this species are on the wing from October to January.

== Habitat ==
This species has shown a preference for manuka scrub habitat.
