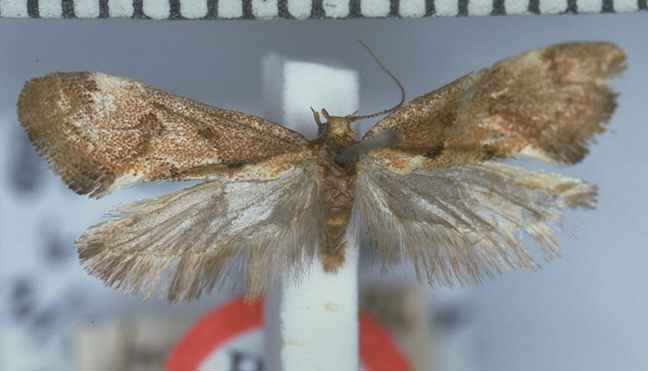
- Male holotype

Scientific classification
- Kingdom: Animalia
- Phylum: Arthropoda
- Class: Insecta
- Order: Lepidoptera
- Family: Oecophoridae
- Genus: Tingena
- Species: T. brachyacma

Binomial name
- Tingena brachyacma (Meyrick, 1909)

Synonyms
- Borkhausenia brachyacma Meyrick, 1909; Borkhausenia amnopis Meyrick, 1910

= Tingena brachyacma =

Species of moth, endemic to New Zealand

Tingena brachyacma is a species of moth in the family Oecophoridae. It is endemic to New Zealand and has been found in the south of the South Island. This species inhabits open swamps, native forest and scrubland and has been collected amongst Leptospermum. The adults of the species are on the wing in November and December.

== Taxonomy ==
This species was first described by Edward Meyrick in 1909 using a specimen collected by Alfred Philpott in October in Invercargill and named Borkhausenia brachyacma. George Hudson discussed and illustrated this species in his 1928 book The butterflies and moths of New Zealand also under the name B. brachyacma. In 1988 John S. Dugdale assigned this species to the genus Tingena. In the same publication Dugdale also synonymised Borkhausenia amnopis with this species. The male holotype specimen is held at the Natural History Museum, London.

== Description ==
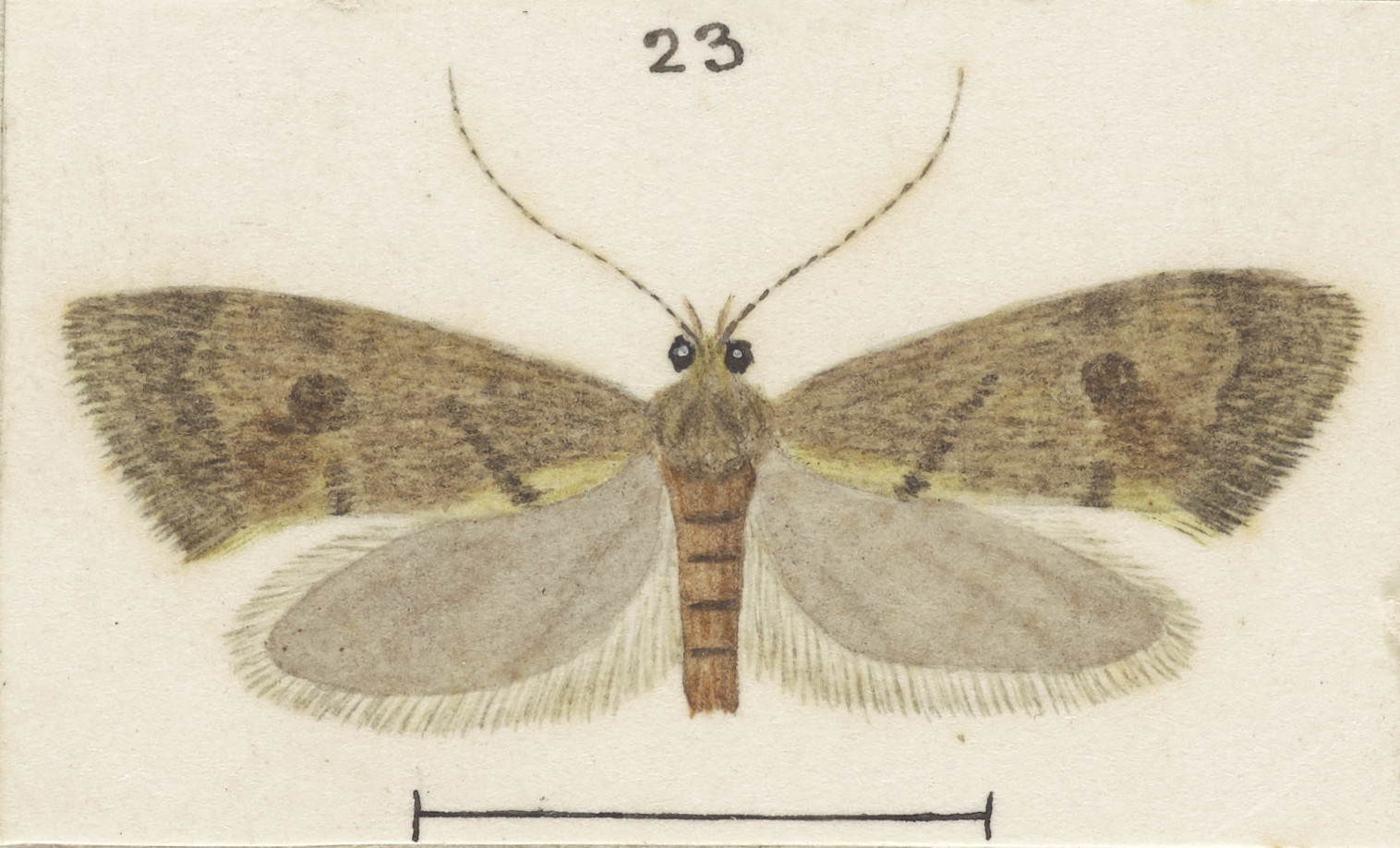
Illustration of T. brachyacma by George Hudson.

Meyrick described the species as follows:

♂. 18 mm. Head whitish-ochreous sprinkled with fuscous. Palpi whitish-ochreous, second joint and a median band of terminal joint irrorated with dark fuscous, terminal joint unusually short, about half second. Antennae pale ochreous suffusedly ringed with dark fuscous, uniformly pubescent-ciliated. Thorax whitish-ochreous suffused with brownish and irrorated with dark fuscous. Abdomen grey, segments dorsally banded with golden-ferruginous. Forewings elongate, costa gently arched, apex round-pointed, termen very obliquely rounded; ochreous-whitish, closely irrorated with brown; a triangular brownish patch above dorsum towards base, limited posteriorly by a fine inwardly oblique blackish line terminating beneath in a conspicuous raised black dot above 2/5 of dorsum, preceded by some whitish suffusion; discal stigmata large, round, brown, edged with a few black scales; a small blackish spot on dorsum at 4/5, whence proceeds a sinuate line of scattered blackish scales near termen, angulated in middle and continued to costa at 4/5, where it is somewhat dilated and preceded by a spot of whitish suffusion; a bar of brown suffusion from second discal stigma to tornus : cilia ochreous-whitish tinged with brown and irrorated with fuscous, at tornus with a grey bar preceded by whitish suffusion. Hind-wings light grey; cilla ochreous-whitish suffused with pale greyish.

This species is similar in appearance to T. innotella but can be distinguished by its large brown discal spot. Also the terminal joint of its palpi is very short and its antennae are pubescent ciliated.

== Distribution ==
This species is endemic to New Zealand. Other than the type locality of Invercargill, this species has also been collected at Waipori River and at Woodhaugh in Dunedin.

== Behaviour ==
Adults of this species are on the wing in November and December.

== Habitat ==
This species is associated with Leptospermum and prefers the habitat of open swamps, native forests and scrubland.
