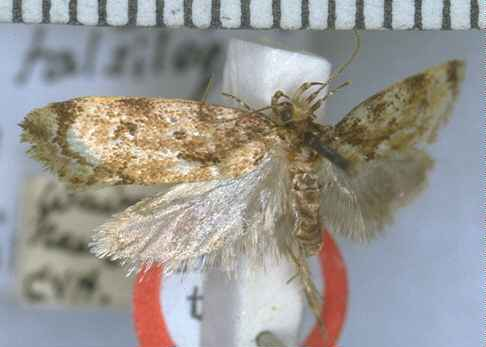
- Male holotype

Scientific classification
- Kingdom: Animalia
- Phylum: Arthropoda
- Class: Insecta
- Order: Lepidoptera
- Family: Oecophoridae
- Genus: Tingena
- Species: T. falsiloqua

Binomial name
- Tingena falsiloqua (Meyrick, 1932)

Synonyms
- Trachypepla falsiloqua Meyrick, 1932

= Tingena falsiloqua =

Species of moth, endemic to New Zealand

Tingena falsiloqua is a species of moth in the family Oecophoridae. It is endemic to New Zealand and has been collected in the North Island. This species frequents subalpine native forest.

== Taxonomy ==
This species was first described by Edward Meyrick in 1932 using specimen collected at Waimarino at an altitude of 2500 ft in January by George Hudson and named Trachypepla falsiloqua. George Hudson discussed this species under the name Trachypepla falsiloqua in his 1939 publication A supplement to the butterflies and moths of New Zealand. In 1988 J. S. Dugdale placed this species in the genus Tingena. The male holotype specimen is held at the Natural History Museum, London.

== Description ==
This species was described by Meyrick as follows:

♂. 20 mm. Head ochreous-whitish, a few greyish hair scales. Palpi whitish, basal half and a subapical band of second joint grey, terminal joint 3/5, with two dark grey bands. Antennal ciliations 1 1/2. Thorax grey, with a rough posterior crest mixed whitish. Forewings elongate, rather dilated, costa gently arched, apex pointed, termen nearly straight, oblique; whitish, partially clouded light greenish-ochreous in disc, some scattered dark brown scales; scales of basal fourth of dorsum roughened; a brown fasciate streak from base of costa above fold to 1/3, plical and first discal stigmata forming small dark bronzy-brown spots on each side of its extremity, plical slightly anterior and edged rough white scales beneath, these scales preceded by a small dark brown tuft; a spot of brownish suffusion on costa at 1/4; second discal stigma rather larger, bronzy-brown, suffused bronzy-brown spots on costa rather before it and on tornus rather beyond it; an excurved dark fuscous line, gradually dilated on upper half, from costa at 4/5 to dorsum before tornus; a suffused fuscous apical spot, and two or three small greyish spots on termen: cilia whitish-ochreous, an interrupted fuscous median line. Hindwings light grey; cilia whitish-grey.

Hudson, in 1939, raised the possibility that this moth might be a form of the variable T. innotella however Dugdale retained this species in his 1988 paper.

== Distribution ==
T. falsiloqua is endemic to New Zealand.

== Habitat ==
This species frequents subalpine native forest.
