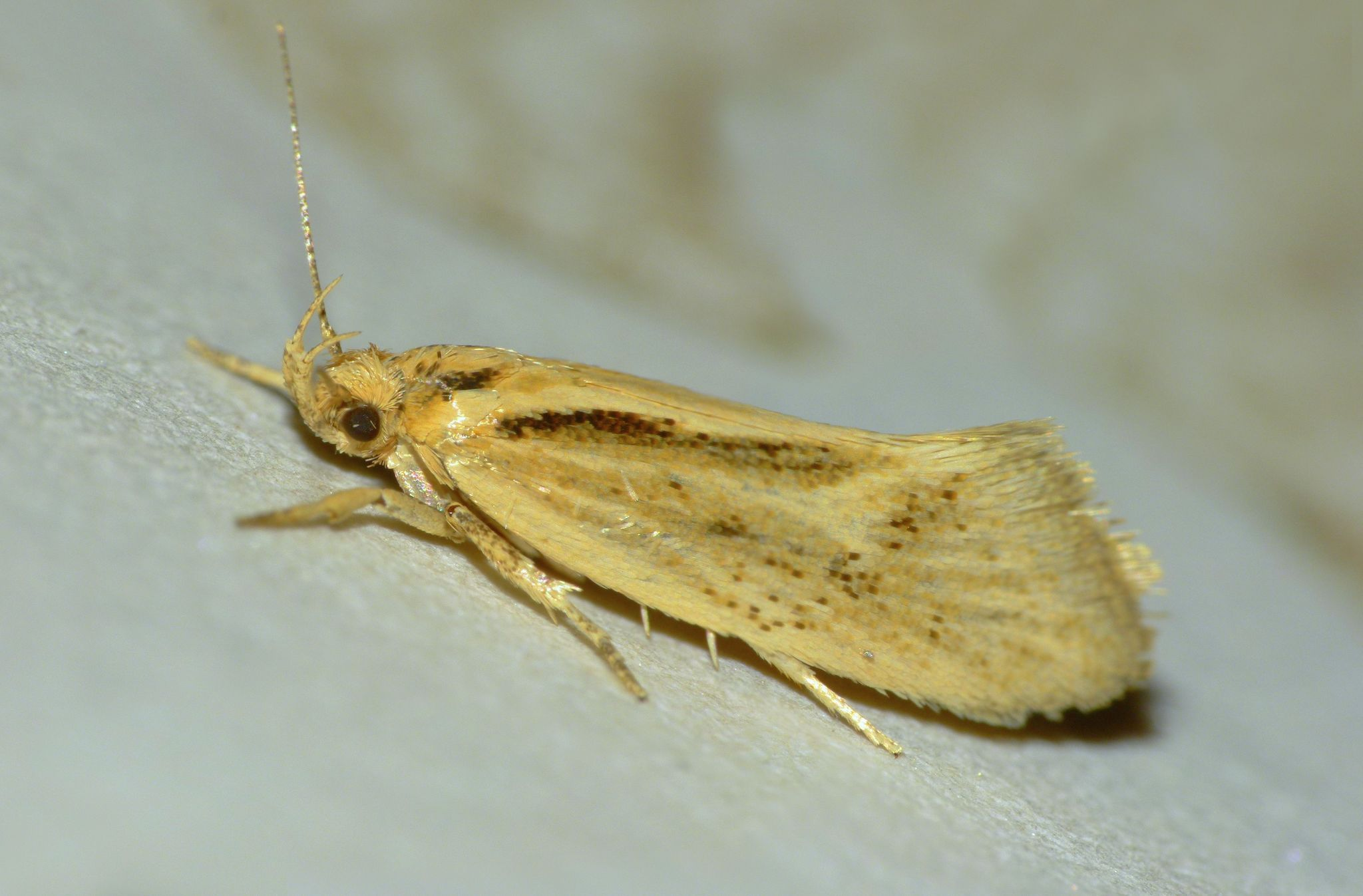

Scientific classification
- Kingdom: Animalia
- Phylum: Arthropoda
- Clade: Pancrustacea
- Class: Insecta
- Order: Lepidoptera
- Family: Oecophoridae
- Genus: Tingena
- Species: T. chloradelpha

Binomial name
- Tingena chloradelpha (Meyrick, 1905)

Synonyms
- Borkhausenia chloradelpha Meyrick, 1905

= Tingena chloradelpha =

Species of moth endemic to New Zealand

Tingena chloradelpha is a species of moth in the family Oecophoridae. It is endemic to New Zealand and can be found in the North and South Islands. The larvae live underground forming silken tubes from which it feeds. It overwinters in these tubes and then pupates enclosed in a weak pale white silken cocoon. The adults of this species is variable in appearance both in the depth of colour as well as in its discal spots which may in some specimens be lacking. The adults are on the wing from October until the end of December and can be found inhabiting domestic gardens as well as cultivated land. They have been seen resting on window frames and can be found inside houses.

== Taxonomy ==
This species was described by Edward Meyrick in 1905 using specimens collected in Wellington by George Hudson and named Borkhausenia chloradelpha. George Hudson discussed and illustrated this species under that name in his 1928 publication The butterflies and moths of New Zealand. In 1988 J. S. Dugdale placed this species within the genus Tingena. The male lectotype is held in the Natural History Museum, London.

== Description ==
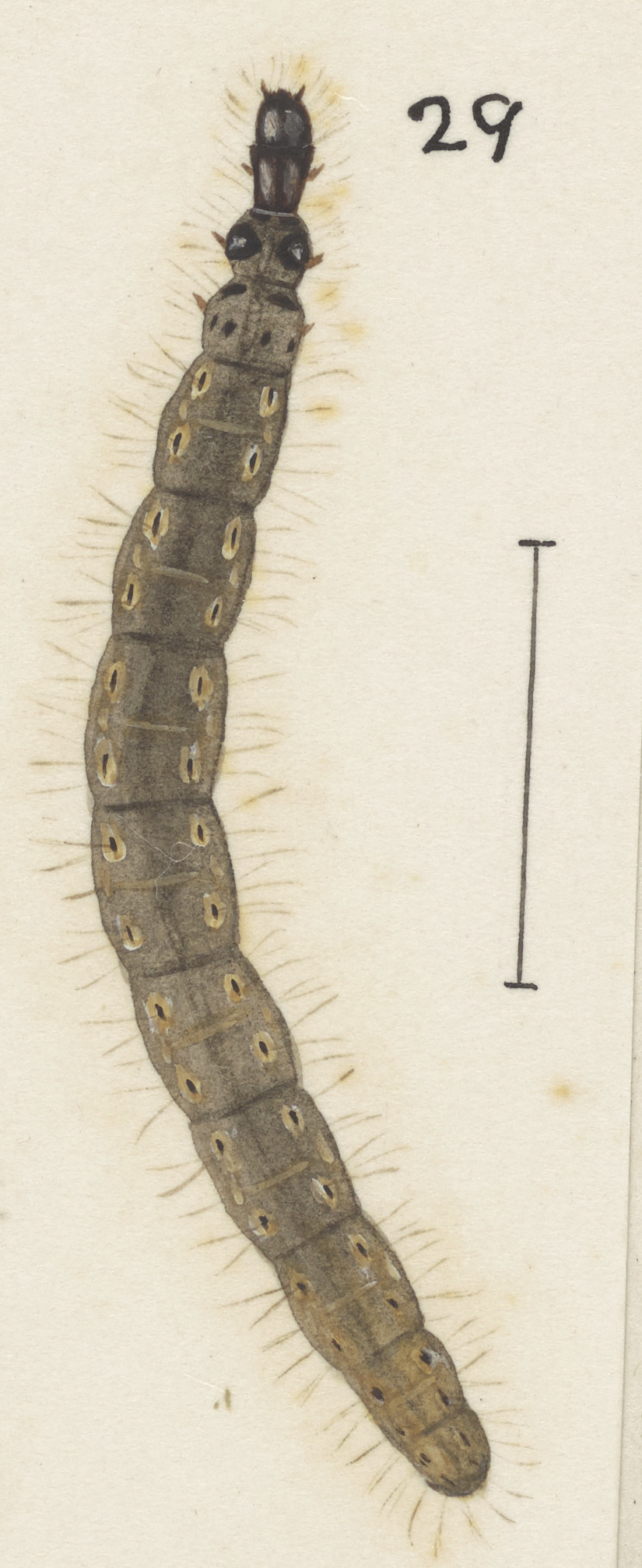
Illustration of larva of T. chloradelpha.

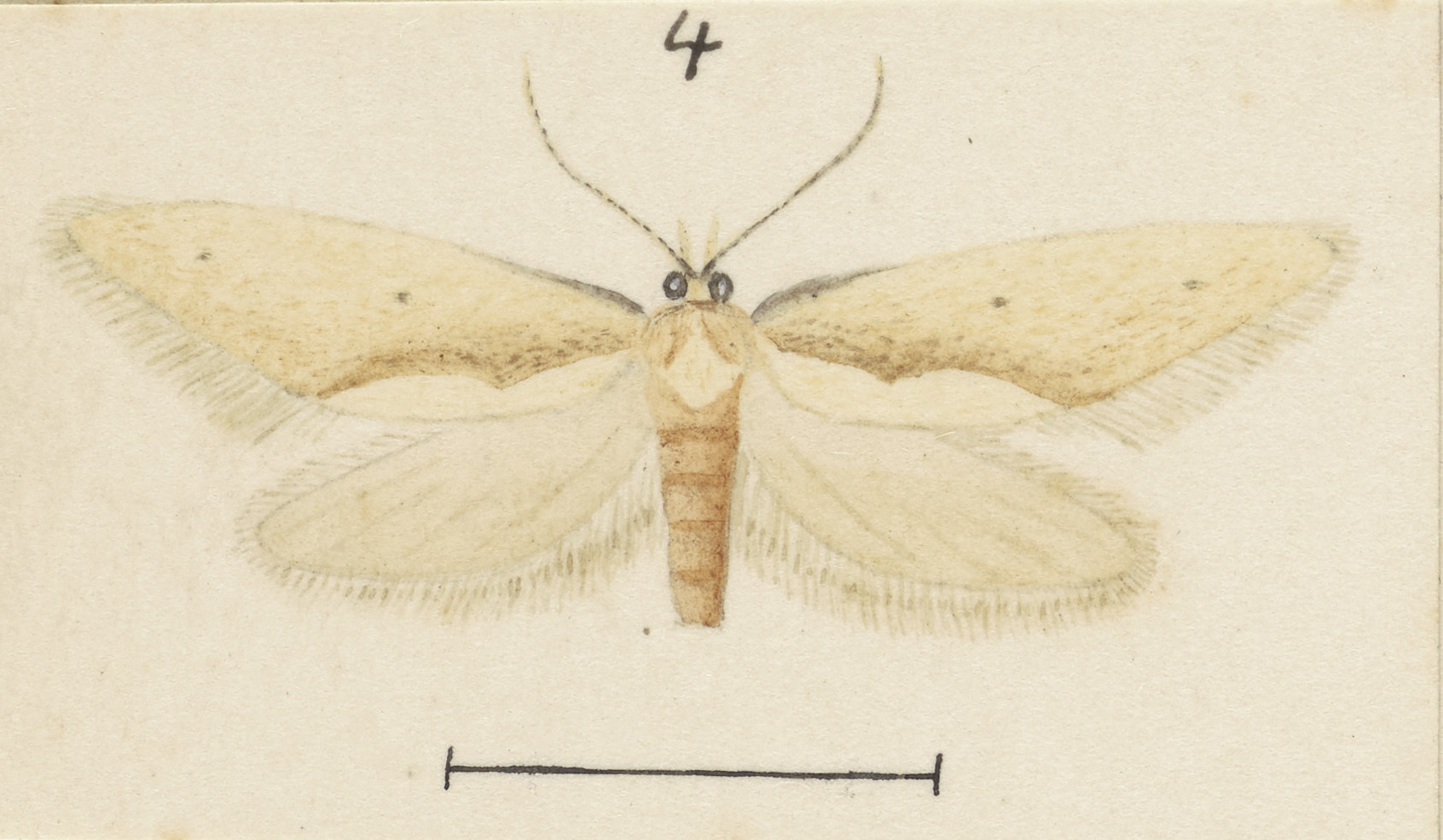
Illustration of adult T. chloradelpha by George Hudson.

Hudson described the larva of this species as follows:

The larva, which was discovered by Mr. R. M. Sunley, is about 3/4 inch in length. The head is very small blackish-brown and horny; the second segment is also entirely horny and very much constricted behind; the third segment has two large horny plates and the fourth segment four very minute ones; the rest of the body is very stout, soft, dull blackish-brown, with a darker dorsal line. Each segment has at least four distinct oblong pale patches, each patch having in its centre a minute horny wart.

The pupa of this species is enclosed in a weak pale white silken cocoon.

Meyrick described the adults of this species as follows:

♂ ♀. 18-20 mm. Head whitish-ochreous. Palpi ochreous-whitish, basal half of second joint sometimes irrorated with dark fuscous. Antennae whitish ringed with dark fuscous, ciliations of ♂ 1. Thorax whitish-ochreous, with brown subdorsal stripes. Abdomen ochreous-whitish. Fore-wings elongate, costa moderately arched, apex pointed, termen faintly sinuate, rather strongly oblique; pale whitish-ochreous, along dorsum and on posterior half more or less partially brownish-tinged and sprinkled with brown and dark brown; a suffused brown streak, mixed with dark brown, along submedian fold from base to tornus; stigmata fuscous, often indistinct, plical obliquely beyond first discal; a subterminal line of dark fuscous scales very indefinitely indicated : cilia pale whitish-ochreous, more or less sprinkled with fuscous. Hind-wings and cilia ochreous-whitish.

This species is similar in appearance to T. griseata and T. innotella but can be distinguished from these two species by its general whitish-ochreous colouring, the submedian brown line on its forewings and hindwings that are a whitish shade. This species is variable in the depth of its colour as well as in the strength of the colour of its discal dots which in some specimens may be lacking.

== Distribution ==
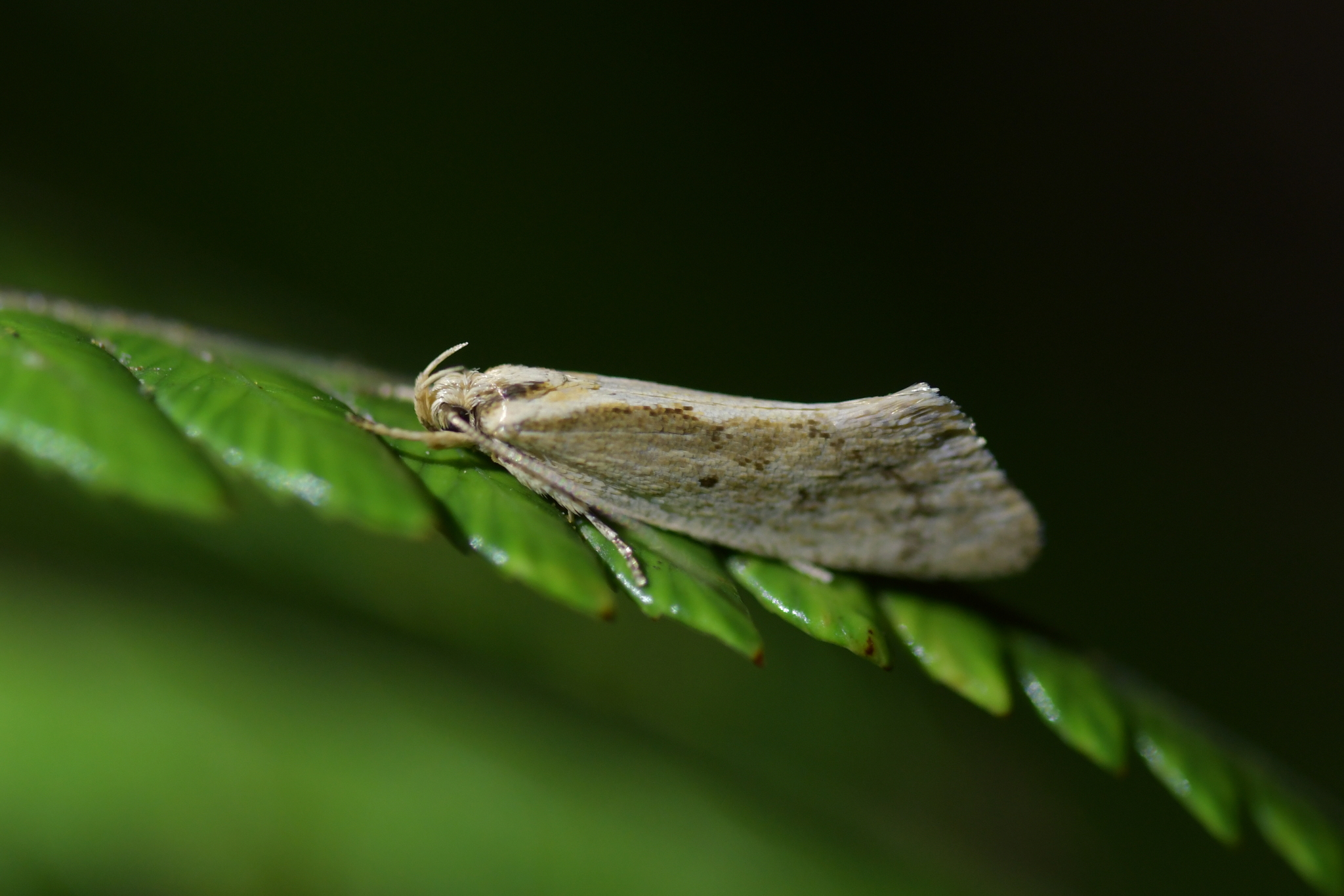
T. chloradelpha

This species is endemic to New Zealand. Other than at its type locality of Wellington, this species has also been observed at Kapiti Island, in New Plymouth, in Christchurch and in Otago.

== Life cycle and behaviour ==
The larvae of this species overwinters and exists underground in the silken tubes in which it lives and from which it feeds. The adults of the species are on the wing from October until the end of December. Adults can often be observed resting on window frames and have frequently been found inside houses.

== Habitat and hosts ==
The larvae lives underground making silken tunnels and feeds on the roots of grasses. It frequents domestic gardens and cultivated land.
