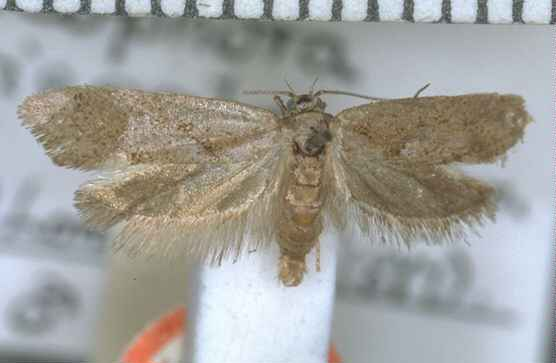
- Male lectotype

Scientific classification
- Kingdom: Animalia
- Phylum: Arthropoda
- Class: Insecta
- Order: Lepidoptera
- Family: Oecophoridae
- Genus: Tingena
- Species: T. griseata

Binomial name
- Tingena griseata (Butler, 1877)

Synonyms
- Oecophora griseata Butler, 1877; Borkhausenia griseata (Butler, 1877)

= Tingena griseata =

Species of moth, endemic to New Zealand

Tingena griseata is a species of moth in the family Oecophoridae. It is endemic to New Zealand and has been observed in North Canterbury. The larvae of this species are leaf litter feeders.

== Taxonomy ==
This species was first described by Arthur Gardiner Butler in 1877 using specimens collected by J.D. Enys and James Hector, and named Oecophora griseata. George Hudson discussed this species under the name Borkhausenia griseata in his 1928 publication The butterflies and moths of New Zealand. In 1988 J. S. Dugdale placed this species within the genus Tingena. The male lectotype specimen, collected either in Christchurch or Dunedin, is held at the Natural History Museum, London.

== Description ==
Butler described this species as follows:

Wings and body above shining grey; primaries irrorated with brown, crossed by two widely separated indistinct oblique brown lines, the inner one angulated at the median nervure, the outer one, which is discal, deeply excavated in the middle; a spot of the same colour at the end of the cell; secondaries with a feeble brassy tinge : primaries below shining brown, fringe grey; secondaries sordid white, speckled with brown; body below pale brown; legs white internally. Expanse of wings 7 lines.

== Distribution ==
This species of moth is endemic to New Zealand and has been observed in North Canterbury including on Rakaia Island.

== Hosts ==
The larvae of this species feed on leaf litter.
