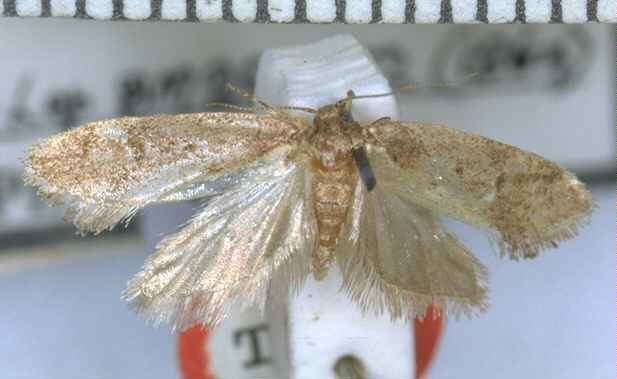
- Female lectotype

Scientific classification
- Kingdom: Animalia
- Phylum: Arthropoda
- Clade: Pancrustacea
- Class: Insecta
- Order: Lepidoptera
- Family: Oecophoridae
- Genus: Tingena
- Species: T. innotella

Binomial name
- Tingena innotella (Walker, 1864)

Synonyms
- Gelechia innotella Walker, 1864; Borkhausenia innotella (Walker, 1864); Gelechia monospilella Walker, 1864; Oecophora politis Meyrick, 1888; Borkhausenia politis (Meyrick, 1888)

= Tingena innotella =

Species of moth, endemic to New Zealand

Tingena innotella is a species of moth in the family Oecophoridae. It is endemic to New Zealand and is found in both the North and South Islands. This species inhabits open native forest or scrubland and adults are on the wing from December to March. T. innotella appears to have an affinity for the silver tree fern.

== Taxonomy ==
This species was first described by Frances Walker in 1864 using specimen collected by D. Bolton in Auckland and named Gelechia innotella. In 1915 Edward Meyrick placed this species within the Borkhausenia genus. George Hudson discussed this species under the name Borkhausenia innotella and illustrated the species under the name Borkhausenia politis in his 1928 publication The butterflies and moths of New Zealand. In 1988 J. S. Dugdale placed this species in the genus Tingena. In the same publication Dugdale synonymised both Gelechia monospilella and Oecophora politis with this species. For G. monospilella, Dugdale justified this synonymisation as the external characters of the holotype of G. monospilella were indistinguishable from the paralectotype of T. innotella. As regards O. politis, Dugdale noted that he doubted if the holotype of O. politis was the same as Meyrick and Hudson's concept of this taxon. He raised this doubt as the original description of O. politis emphasised the "whitish-ochreous" ground colour of the specimen being described. However he justified his synonymisation as Alfred Philpott's illustrations of the genitalia of O. politis in his 1926 publication agrees with T. innotella specimens collected by Hudson in Wellington post 1887 and sent to Meyrick. However Dugdale did point out that these specimens have a brown ground colour rather than a white-ochreous ground colour. The female lectotype is held at the Natural History Museum, London.

== Description ==
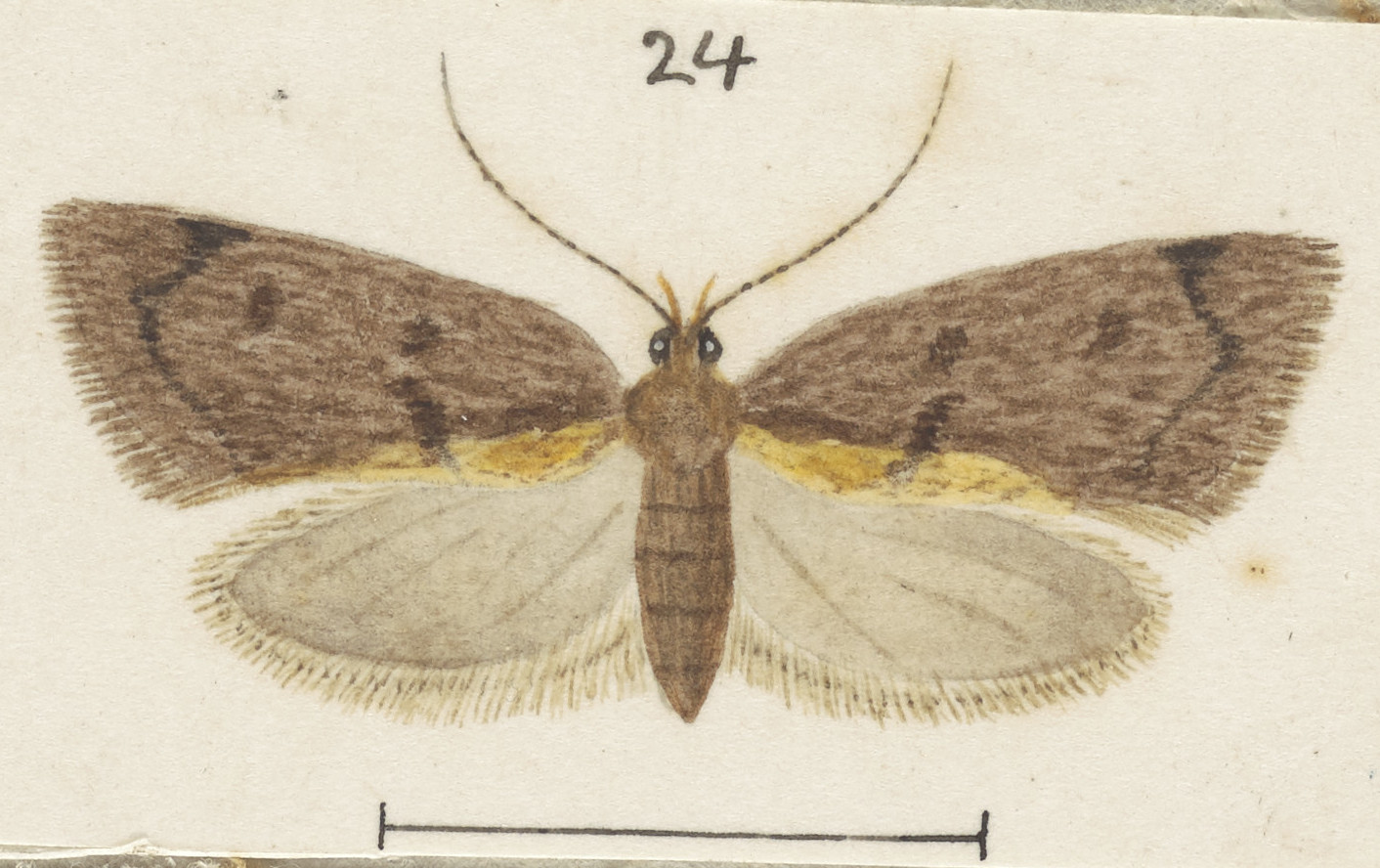
Illustration of female T. innotella by George Hudson.

Walker originally described this species as follows:

Male and female. Cinereous. Palpi smooth, slender, curved, much longer than the breadih of the head; third joint setiform, shorter than the second. Antennae of the male very minutely setulose. Hind tibiae slightly fringed. Wings moderately broad. Forewings acute, thickly speckled with brown; a brown dot in the disk beyond the middle in front of a whitish dot; costa straight; exterior border rather oblique. Length of the body 2 1/2 — 3 lines; of the wings 8 lines.

Hudson described the species as follows:

The expansion of the wings is slightly over 5/8 inch. The fore-wings, which are dilated towards the termen, are pale ochreous-brown with darker brown markings; there is a rather broad wavy line from the dorsum at 1/3 nearly reaching the first discal dot; the second discal dot is situated at about 2/3 and is often connected with the tornus by an oblique line; there is a doubly curved sub-terminal line from the costa before the apex to the tornus. The hind-wings are grey.

There is variation in both the depth of ground colour of this species as well as how distinctive the markings on the forewings are.

== Distribution ==
This species is endemic to New Zealand and has been observed in location such as Whangārei, Auckland, Napier, Wellington, Nelson, Christchurch, Castle Hill, Dunedin and Invercargill.

== Behaviour ==
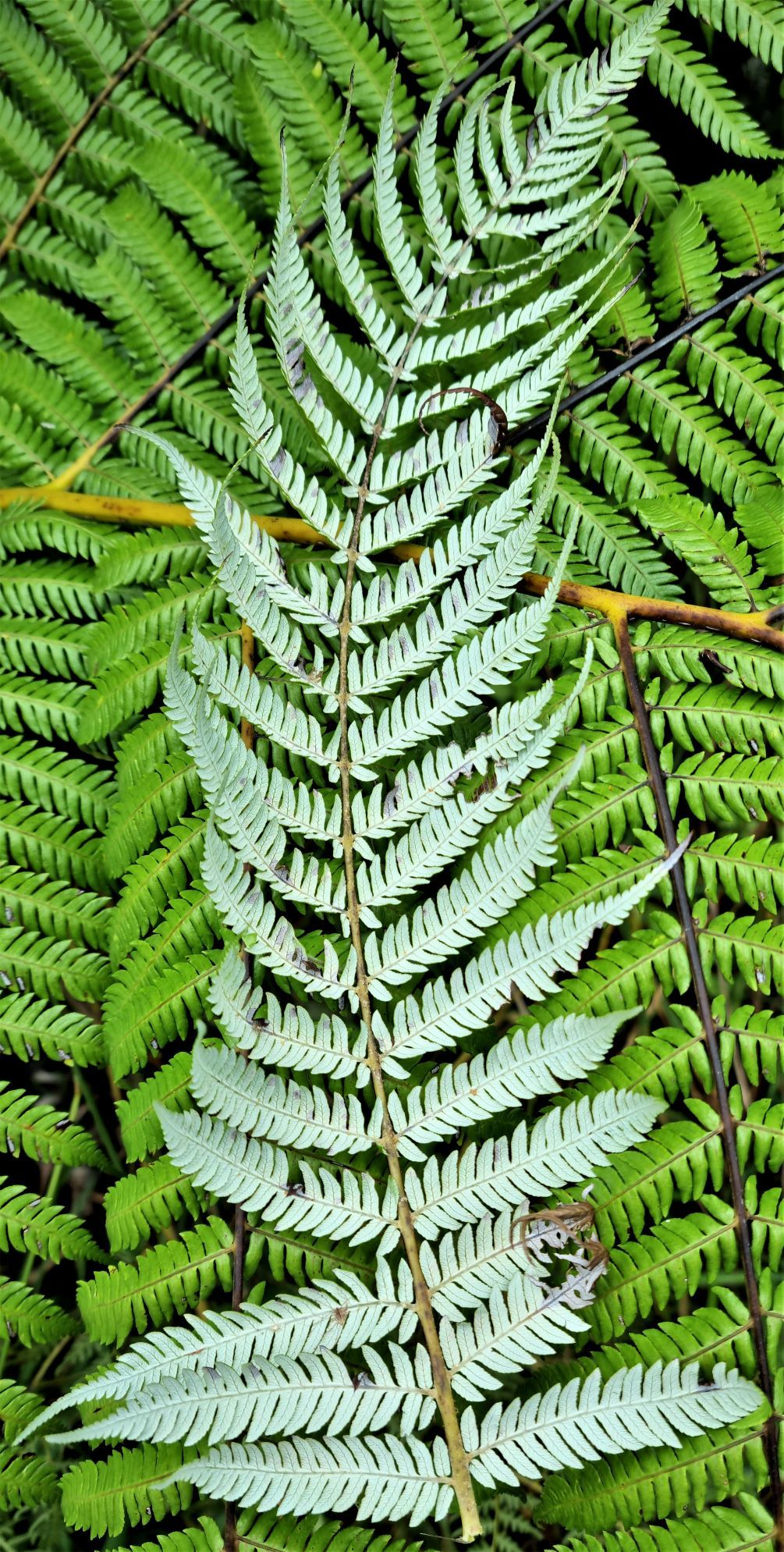
Silver tree fern

Adults of this species are on the wing from December until March. This species has an affinity for the silver tree fern.

== Habitat ==
This species prefers open native forest or scrub habitat.
