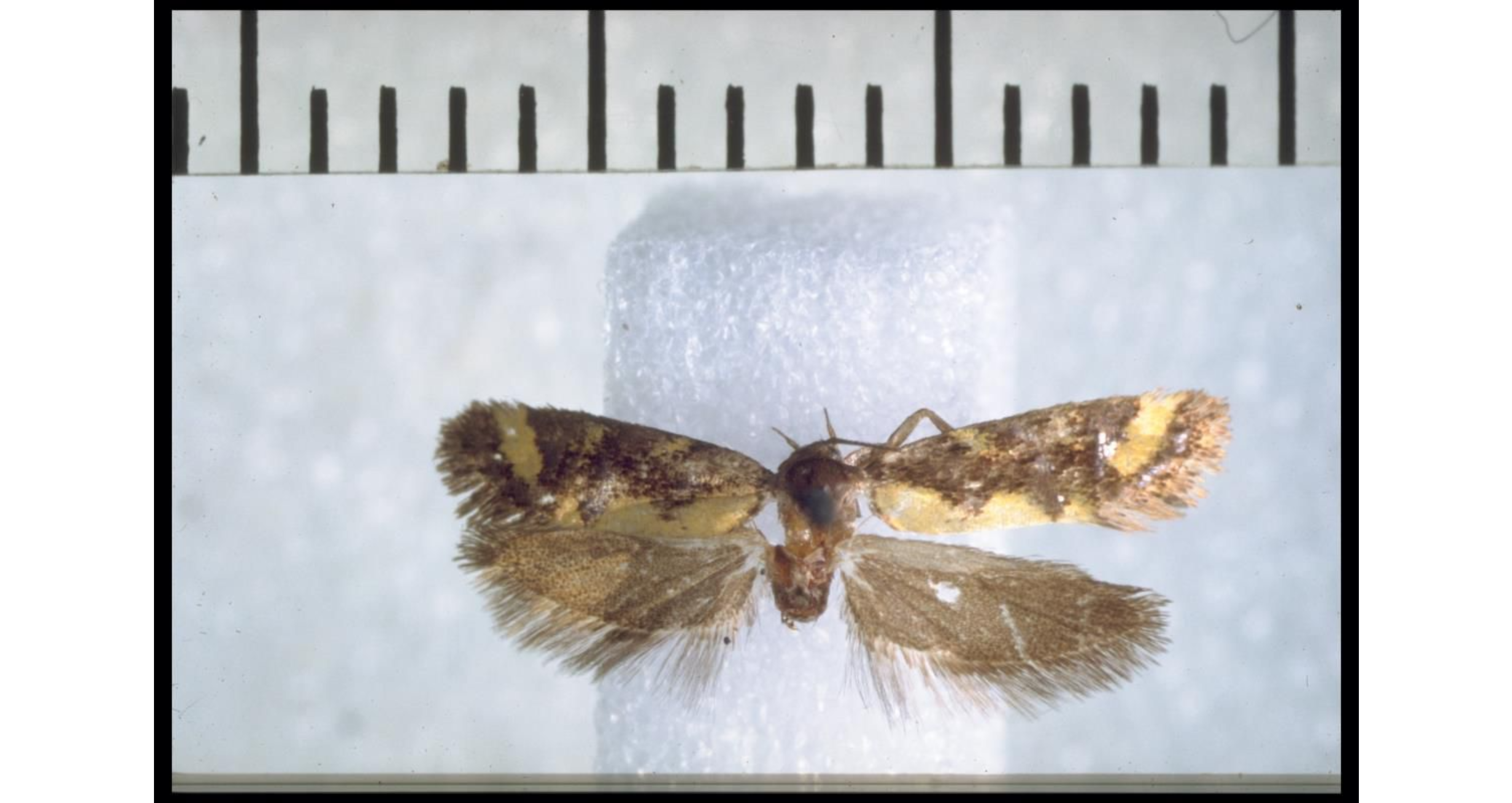
- Male holotype

Scientific classification
- Kingdom: Animalia
- Phylum: Arthropoda
- Class: Insecta
- Order: Lepidoptera
- Family: Oecophoridae
- Genus: Tingena
- Species: T. honorata

Binomial name
- Tingena honorata (Philpott, 1918)

Synonyms
- Borkhausenia honorata Philpott, 1918

= Tingena honorata =

Species of moth, endemic to New Zealand

Tingena honorata is a species of moth in the family Oecophoridae. It is endemic to New Zealand and has been observed in the South Island including in Fiordland, Southland and Otago. This species has inhabits damp openings in native forest. The adults of this species are on the wing in December and January and are attracted to light.

== Taxonomy ==
This species was first described by Alfred Philpott in 1918 using specimens collected in Invercargill and at Knife and Steel harbour in Southland and named Borkhausenia honorata. George Hudson discussed and illustrated this species in his 1928 book The butterflies and moths of New Zealand also under the same name. In 1988 J. S. Dugdale placed this species in the genus Tingena. The male holotype specimen, collected at Knife and Steel harbour, is held in the New Zealand Arthropod Collection.

== Description ==
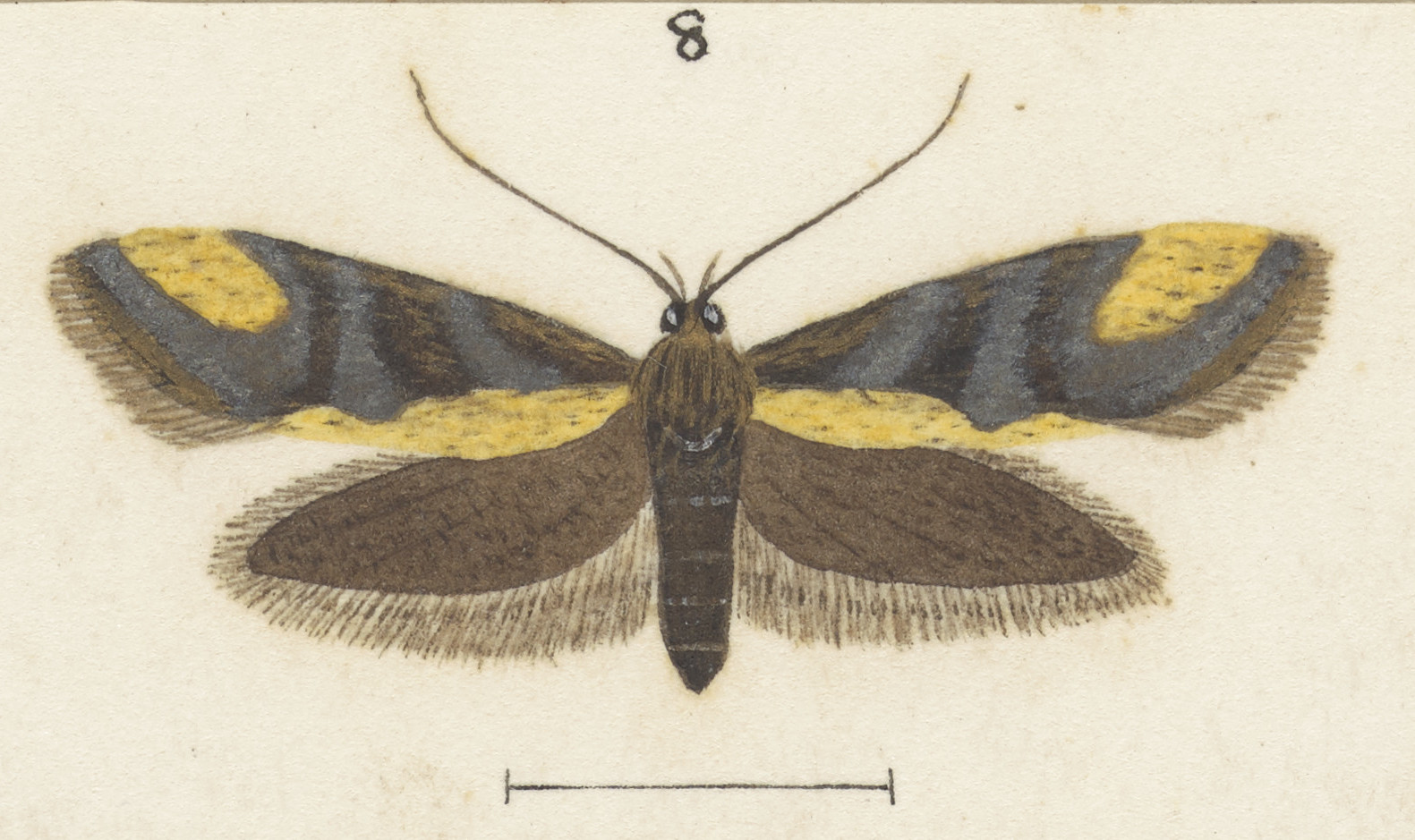
Illustration of T. honorata by George Hudson.

Philpott described this species as follows:

♂. 12 mm. Head, palpi, antennae, and thorax dark bronzy-brown. Abdomen dark fuscous. Legs fuscous, tarsi annulated with yellow. Fore-wings moderate, costa moderately arched, apex obtuse, termen rounded, oblique, dark fuscous-brown; a broad yellow stripe along dorsum, indented above before middle and tornus; an irregular yellow blotch beneath costa at 1/3 and a similar one before 2/3, both sometimes absent; a broad straight yellow fascia from costa at 4/5, parallel to termen, reaching 2/3 across wing : cilia fuscous. Hindwings and cilia dark fuscous.

This species is similar in appearance to Tingena chrysogramma but difference in the placement of the yellow marking on the forewings.

== Distribution ==
This species is endemic to New Zealand and has been observed in Fiordland, Southland and Otago.

== Behaviour ==
This species is on the wing in December and January and is attracted to light.

== Habitat ==
This species has been collected at damp openings in native forest.
