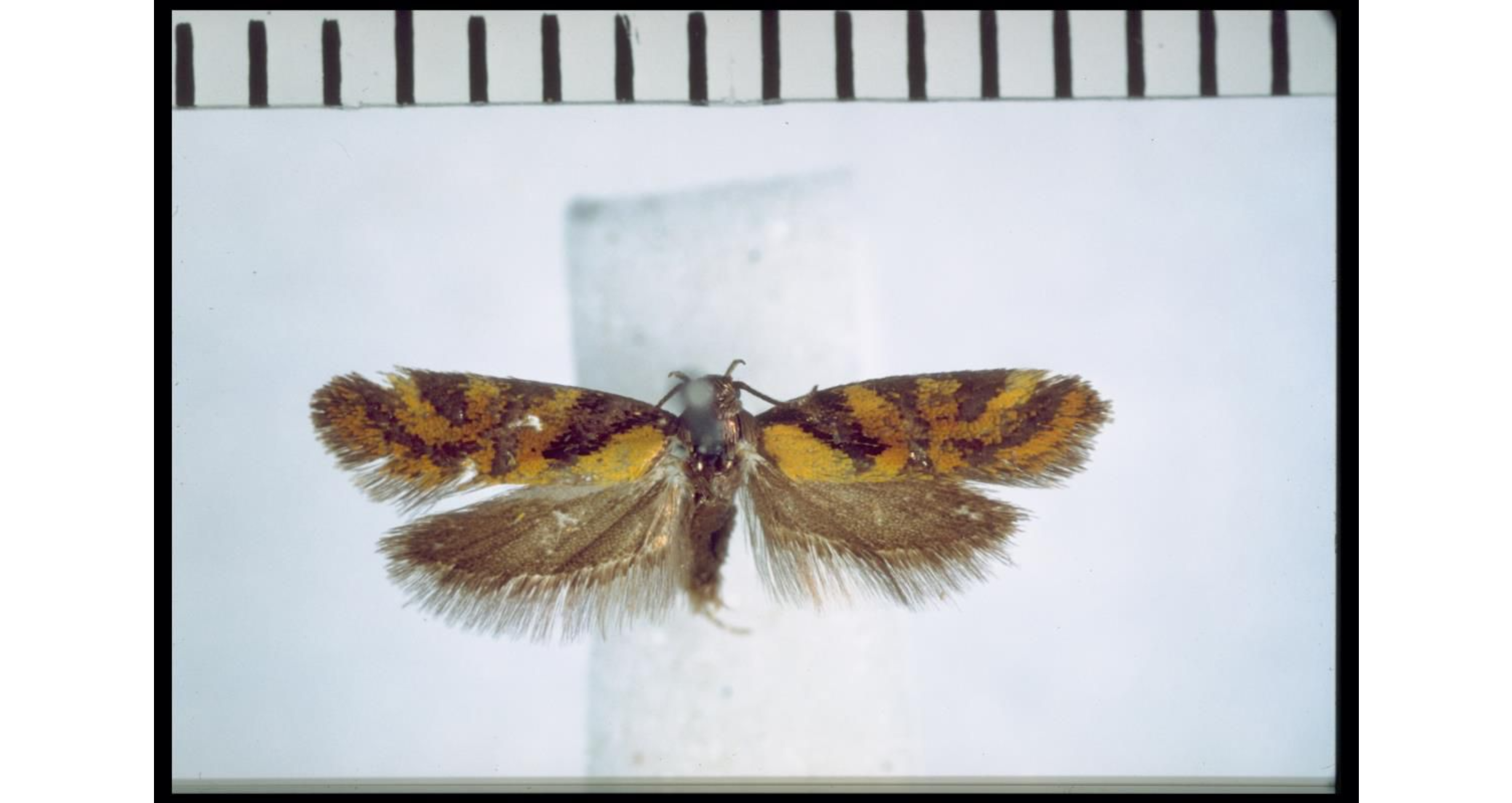
- Male holotype

Scientific classification
- Kingdom: Animalia
- Phylum: Arthropoda
- Class: Insecta
- Order: Lepidoptera
- Family: Oecophoridae
- Genus: Tingena
- Species: T. decora

Binomial name
- Tingena decora (Philpott, 1928)

Synonyms
- Borkhausenia decora Philpott, 1928

= Tingena decora =

Species of moth, endemic to New Zealand

Tingena decora is a species of moth in the family Oecophoridae. It is endemic to New Zealand and has been collected at Lake Rotoroa and adults are on the wing in February.

== Taxonomy ==
This species was first described by Alfred Philpott in 1928 using specimens collected at Lake Rotoroa, near Nelson in February and named Borkhausenia decora. In 1939 George Hudson discussed and illustrated this species under the name B. decora. In 1988 J. S. Dugdale placed this species within the genus Tingena. The male holotype is held in the New Zealand Arthropod Collection.

== Description ==
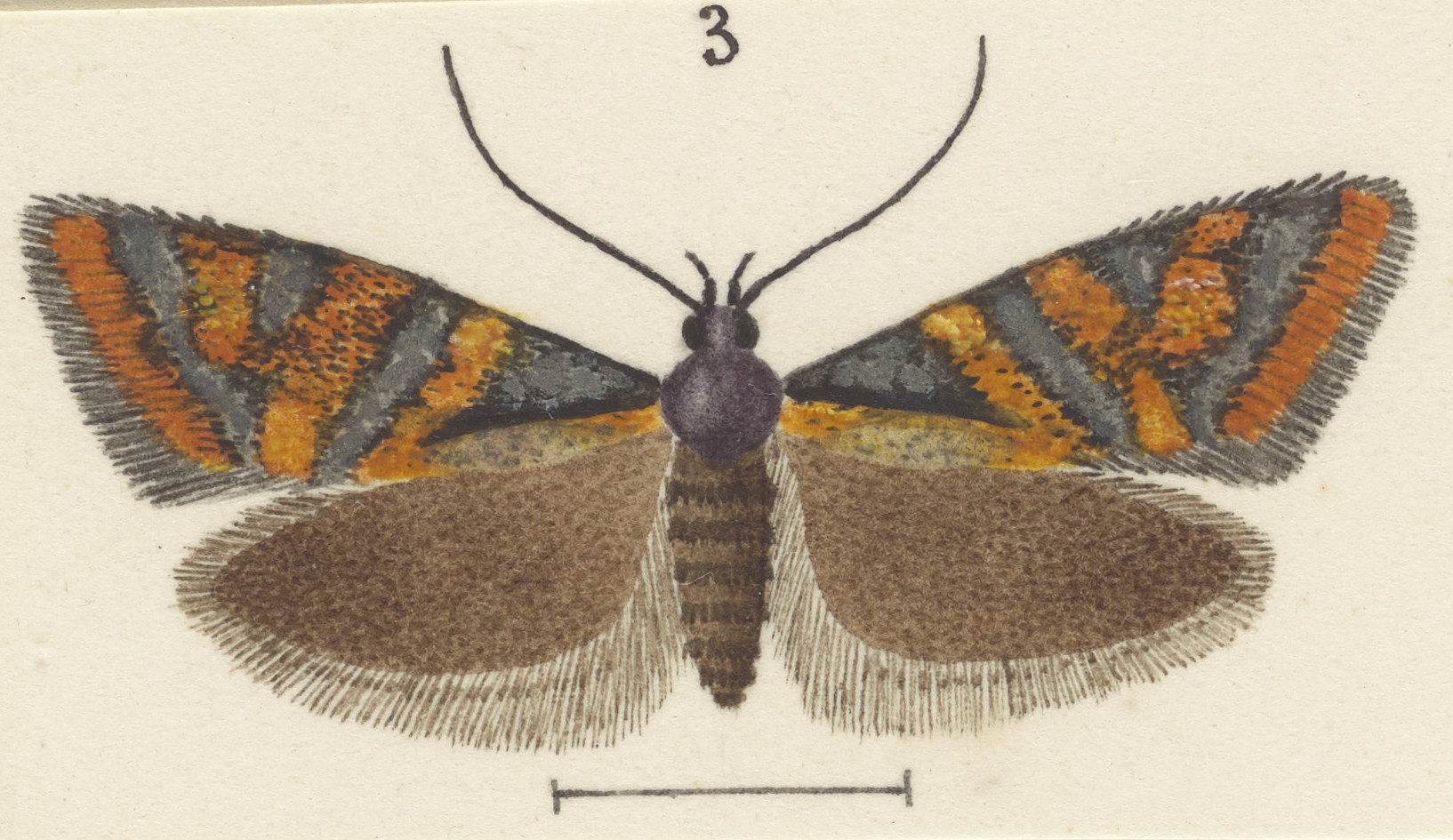
Illustration of T. decora by George Hudson.

Philpott described this species as follows:

♂. 9–11 mm. Head, palpi, thorax and abdomen purplish-black. Antennae purplish-black, ciliations ¾. Legs purplish-fuscous, tarsi annulated with ochreous. Forewings, costa slightly arched, apex broadly rounded, termen rounded, strongly oblique; bright yellow to orange; markings shining silvery; an outwardly oblique fascia from 1/6, broadly margined with black, reaching beyond fold; an almost straight fascia from middle of costa to before dorsum; a triangular fascia from costa at ¾ reaching half across wing; a narrow subterminal fascia parallel to termen; the last three fasciae with a few black scales on margins: fringes dark fuscous, base orange. Hindwings dark fuscous: fringes dark fuscous with darker basal line.

This species is very similar in appearance to T. compsogramma but T. docora is a more rich and darkly coloured moth.

== Distribution ==
This species is endemic to New Zealand and has been collected at Lake Rotoroa.

== Behaviour ==
This species is on the wing in February.
