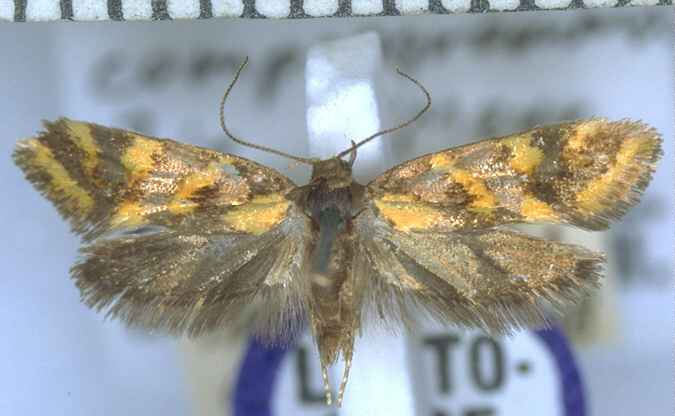
- Male lectotype

Scientific classification
- Kingdom: Animalia
- Phylum: Arthropoda
- Clade: Pancrustacea
- Class: Insecta
- Order: Lepidoptera
- Family: Oecophoridae
- Genus: Tingena
- Species: T. compsogramma

Binomial name
- Tingena compsogramma (Meyrick, 1920)

Synonyms
- Borkhausenia compsogramma Meyrick, 1920

= Tingena compsogramma =

Species of moth, endemic to New Zealand

Tingena compsogramma is a species of moth in the family Oecophoridae. It is endemic to New Zealand and has been observed in the North and South Islands. This species inhabits native forest and adults are on the wing from December until March.

== Taxonomy ==
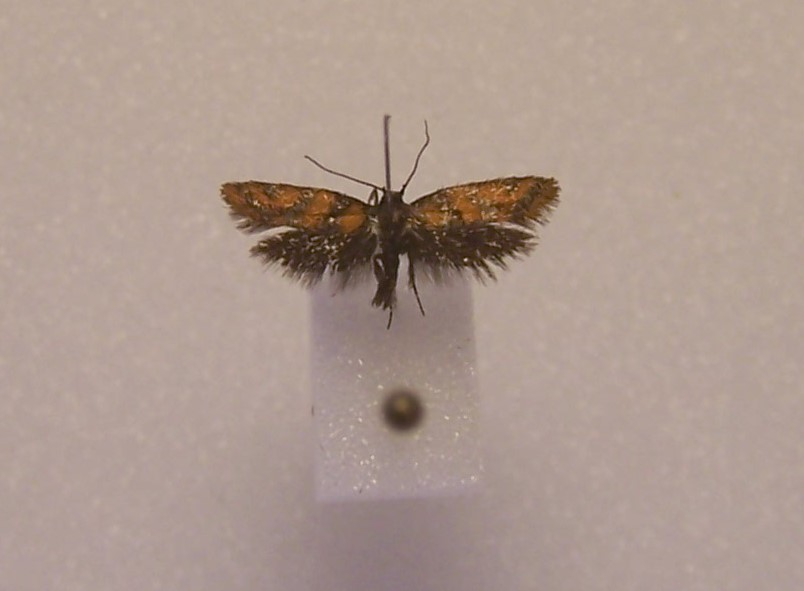
T. compsogramma

This species was first described by Edward Meyrick in 1920 using specimens collected by George Hudson along the Buller River in December and named Borkhausenia compsogramma. George Hudson discussed and illustrated this species under the same name in his 1928 publication The butterflies and moths of New Zealand. In 1988 J. S. Dugdale placed this species in the genus Tingena. The male lectotype specimen is held at the Natural History Museum, London.

== Description ==
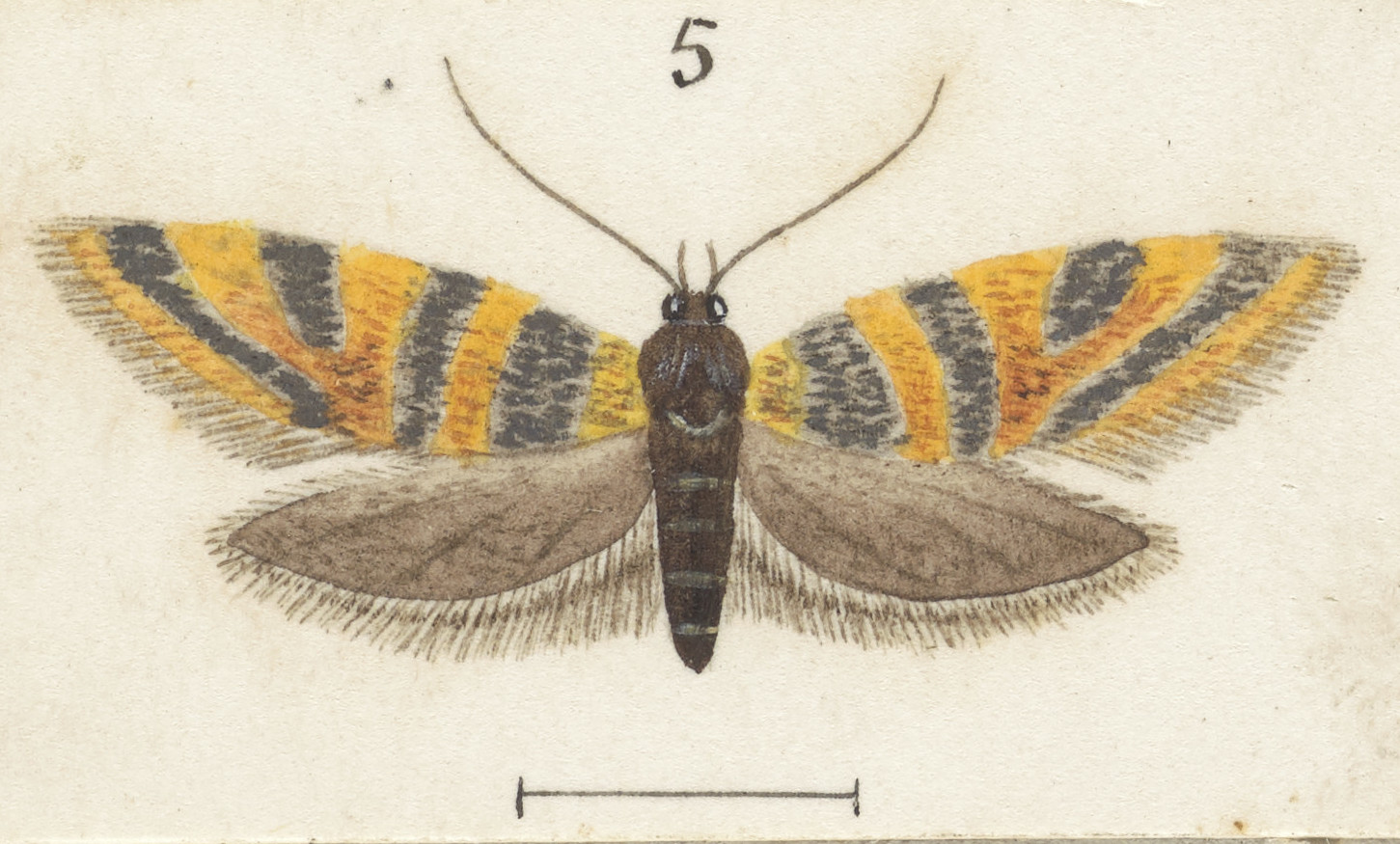
Illustration of T. compsogramma by George Hudson.

Edward Meyrick described this species as follows:

♂. 13-15 mm. Head, thorax, and abdomen dark purplish-fuscous. Antennal ciliations 1. Palpi grey, second joint sometimes partially suffused with whitish-yellowish. Forewings elongate, costa gently arched, apex obtuse, termen obliquely rounded; dark violet-fuscous; markings ochreous-yellow suffused in disc with fulvous-orange, and with some scattered blackish scales on their edges; an oval blotch extending over basal fourth of dorsum; a narrow irregular rather oblique fascia from costa before 1/3, not reaching dorsum; a transverse fasciate blotch from costa beyond middle, and another inwardly oblique from costa at 4/5, both directed towards but not reaching a spot on dorsum before tornus; a streak along termen throughout : cilia fuscous, base scaled with ochreous-yellow along terminal streak. Hindwings and cilia dark grey.

This species is variable in the intensity of its forewing markings and as well as ground colour. It is similar in appearance to T. chrysogramma but is distinct.

== Distribution ==
This species is endemic to New Zealand and has been observed in the North Island, including at Mount Ruapehu and at Kaitoke, and in the South Island, including in Otago at the Humboldt Range, Lake Wakatipu and at the Hunter Mountains.

== Behaviour ==
Adults of this species are on the wing from December until March.

== Habitat ==
This species inhabits native forests often at altitude.
