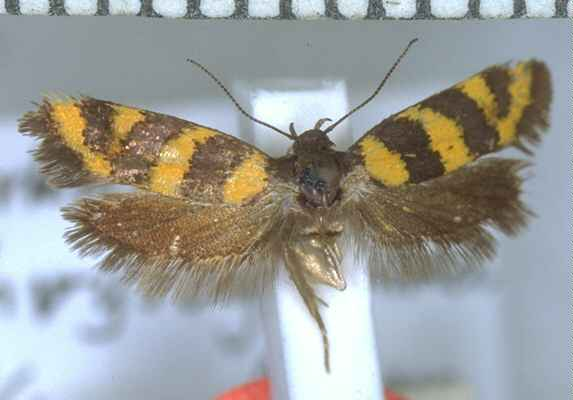
- Female holotype

Scientific classification
- Kingdom: Animalia
- Phylum: Arthropoda
- Clade: Pancrustacea
- Class: Insecta
- Order: Lepidoptera
- Family: Oecophoridae
- Genus: Tingena
- Species: T. chrysogramma

Binomial name
- Tingena chrysogramma (Meyrick, 1883)

Synonyms
- Oecophora chrysogramma Meyrick, 1883; Borkhausenia chrysogramma (Meyrick, 1883)

= Tingena chrysogramma =

Species of moth, endemic to New Zealand

Tingena chrysogramma is a species of moth in the family Oecophoridae. It is endemic to New Zealand and is found in the North and South Islands. The adults of this species inhabits open scrubland and are on the wing in January and February. It has been collected via light traps and beating shrubs. During sunny days this species has been observed resting on leaves and rarely flies. It is regarded as a rare species and has a possible association with Prumnopitys ferruginea.

== Taxonomy ==
This species was first described by Edward Meyrick in 1883 using a female specimen he collected in Wellington in December at rest on a fence post. He originally named the species Oecophora chrysogramma. Meyrick gave a more detailed description under this name in 1884. In 1915 Meyrick placed this species within the Borkhausenia genus. In 1926 Alfred Philpott studied the genitalia of the male of this species. George Hudson discussed this species under the name B. chrysogramma in his 1928 publication The butterflies and moths of New Zealand. In 1988 J. S. Dugdale placed this species in the genus Tingena. The female holotype is held at the Natural History Museum, London.

== Description ==
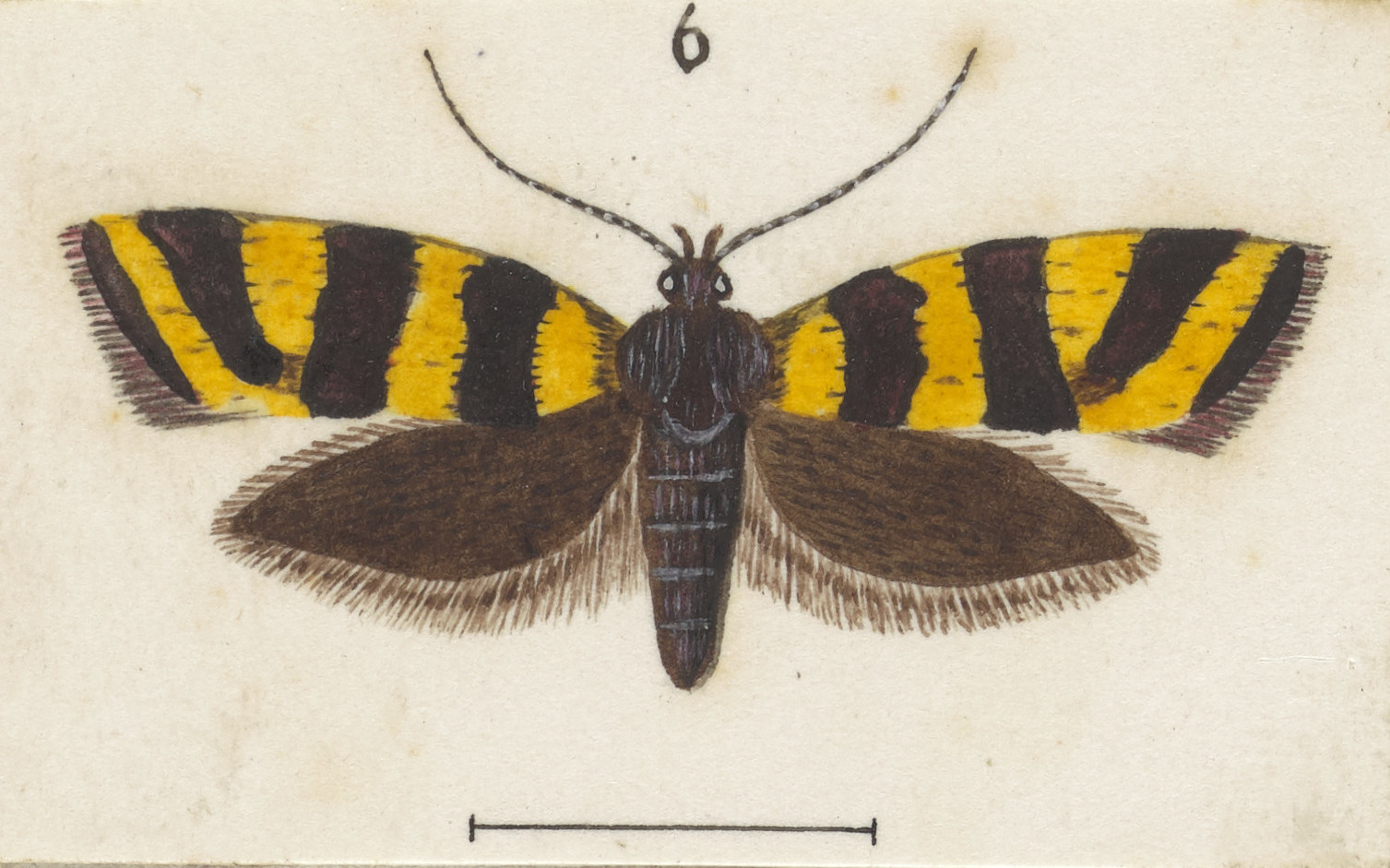
Illustration of T. chrysogramma by George Hudson.

Meyrick first described this species as follows:

Fore wings narrow, deep yellow, base, two oblique fasciae, a costal spot, and hind marginal streak dark purple-fuscous; hind wings dark fuscous.

Meyrick then went on to give a more detailed description as follows:

Female. — 12 1/2 mm. Head, palpi, antennae, thorax, abdomen, and legs dark purplish-fuscous, apex of tarsal joints ochreous-whitish. Forewings elongate, costa moderately arched, apex rounded, hindmargin very obliquely rounded; deep golden-yellow; extreme base dark fuscous; anterior half of costal edge dark fuscous; markings dark purple-grey, edged with blackish-fuscous; a rather broad slightly curved oblique transverse fascia from 1/4 of costa to 1/3 of inner margin, and a second from middle of costa to 2/3 of inner margin; a transverse somewhat narrower perpendicular spot from costa at 3/4, reaching more than half across wing, narrowed beneath, almost touching second fascia; a streak along hindmargin : cilia dark purple-grey. Hind-wings and cilia dark fuscous.

== Distribution ==
This species is endemic to New Zealand. Other than its type locality of Wellington, this species has also been observed at Waimarino and at Ohakune. Hudson states that a duller form of this species can be found in the South Island.

== Behaviour ==
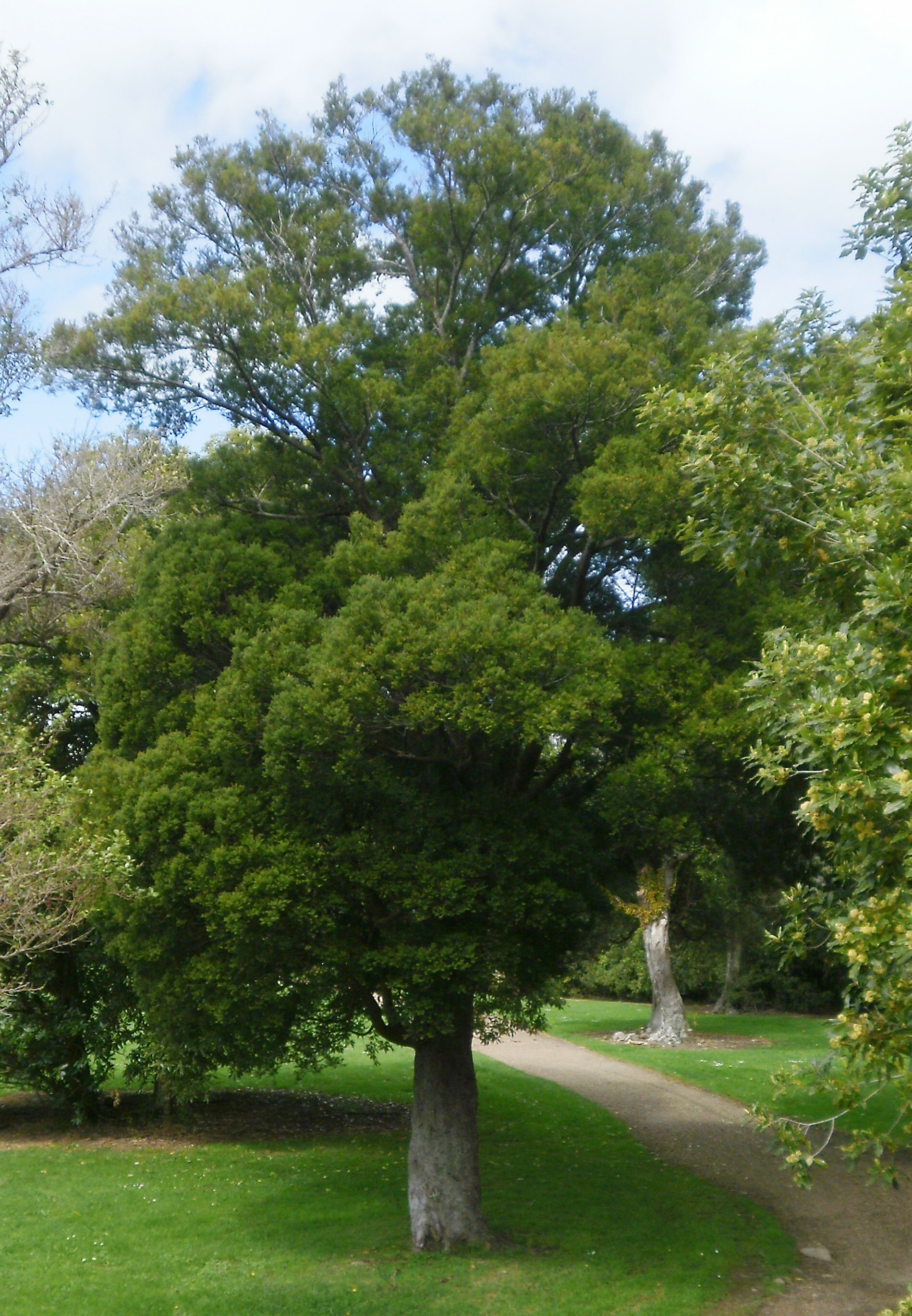
Prumnopitys ferruginea, also known as miro.

This species is on the wing in January and February and is attracted to light. Hudson also collected this species by beating shrubs. During sunny days this species rests on leaves and is rarely observed flying. It is regarded as a rare species and has a possible association with Prumnopitys ferruginea.

== Habitat ==
This species inhabits open scrubland.
