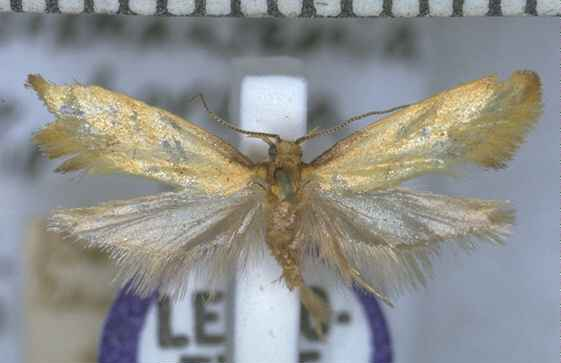
- Male lectotype

Scientific classification
- Kingdom: Animalia
- Phylum: Arthropoda
- Class: Insecta
- Order: Lepidoptera
- Family: Oecophoridae
- Genus: Tingena
- Species: T. horaea

Binomial name
- Tingena horaea (Meyrick, 1883)

Synonyms
- Oecophora horaea Meyrick, 1883; Borkhausenia horaea (Meyrick, 1883)

= Tingena horaea =

Species of moth, endemic to New Zealand

Tingena horaea is a species of moth in the family Oecophoridae. It is endemic to New Zealand and have been observed in both the North and South Islands. The adults are on the wing in January.

== Taxonomy ==
This species was first described by Edward Meyrick in 1883 using specimens collected at Hamilton and the Bealey River in January. Meyrick originally named the species Oecophora horaea. Meyrick went on to give a fuller description of the species in 1884. In 1915 Meyrick placed this species within the Borkhausenia genus. In 1926 Alfred Philpott was unable to study the genitalia of the male of this species as it was not represented in collections in New Zealand. George Hudson discussed this species under the name Borkhausenia horaea in his 1928 publication The butterflies and moths of New Zealand. In 1988 J. S. Dugdale placed this species in the genus Tingena. The male lectotype specimen is held at the Natural History Museum, London.

== Description ==
Meyrick originally described this species as follows:

Fore wings whitish-ochreous, suffused with yellowish-ochreous, a blackish streak on base of costa, a mark on fold, another on anal angle, and two costal dots obscurely dark fuscous; hind wings grey; thorax anteriorly dark fuscous, posteriorly yellowish.

Meyrick gave a fuller description as follows:

Male, female. — 13 1/2-15 mm. Head light yellowish-ochreous. Palpi light yellowish-ochreous, basal half of both joints finely irrorated externally with dark fuscous. Antennae in male dark fuscous, in female whitish-ochreous annulated with dark fuscous. Thorax light yellowish-ochreous, anterior half suffused with dark fuscous. Abdomen grey, apex whitish-ochreous. Anterior legs dark fuscous; middle legs whitish- ochreous irrorated with dark fuscous, except in middle of tibiae and at apex of joints; posterior legs whitish-ochreous. Forewings moderate, costa moderately arched, apex rounded, hindmargin very obliquely rounded; whitish- ochreous, rather suffused with yellowish-ochreous, costal margin yellowish-ochreous; costa suffusedly blackish towards base; a few blackish scales on fold at 1/3, on costa in middle and at 3/4, and above anal angle; posterior half of wing more or less irrorated very finely with fuscous : cilia pale yellowish-ochreous, irrorated with fuscous points, especially on tips round apex, and on a spot at anal angle. Hindwings grey; cilia whitish-grey.

It has been suggested that this species differs from other close relatives as it has a distinctive ochreous shade to its forewings. However Dugdale pointed out that both the genitalia as well as the hindwing anal fold powder puff of this species were similar to its close relatives T. serena and T. anaema. Dugdale also states that of the 9 paralectotype specimens in the series collected by Meyrick, at least four specimens appear to be T. actinias.

== Distribution ==
This species is endemic to New Zealand and has been observed in both the North and South Islands.

== Behaviour ==
The adults of this species are on the wing in January.
