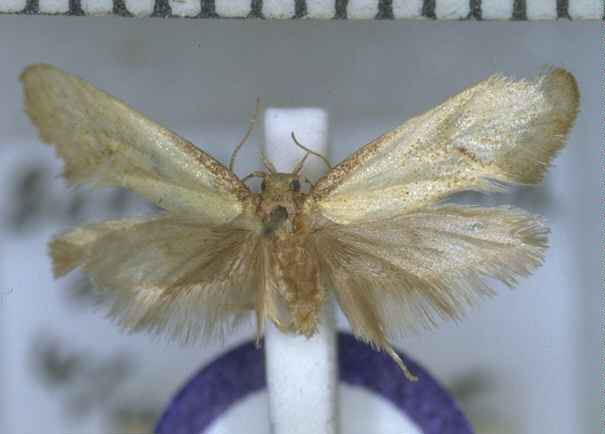
- Male lectotype

Scientific classification
- Kingdom: Animalia
- Phylum: Arthropoda
- Class: Insecta
- Order: Lepidoptera
- Family: Oecophoridae
- Genus: Tingena
- Species: T. anaema

Binomial name
- Tingena anaema (Meyrick, 1883)

Synonyms
- Oecophora anaema Meyrick, 1883; Borkhausenia anaema (Meyrick, 1883); Borkhausenia anaema (Meyrick, 1884)

= Tingena anaema =

Species of moth, endemic to New Zealand

Tingena anaema is a species of moth in the family Oecophoridae. It is endemic to New Zealand and has been collected at Lake Wakatipu, Invercargill and Stewart Island / Rakiura. The adults of the species are on the wing in December.

== Taxonomy ==
This species was first described by Edward Meyrick in 1883 using specimens collected at Lake Wakatipu in December and named Oecophora anaema. Meyrick gave a more detailed description under this name in 1884. In 1915 Meyrick placed this species within the Borkhausenia genus. In 1926 Alfred Philpott was unable to study the genitalia of the male of this species as a result of no specimens being available in New Zealand collections. George Hudson discussed this species under the name B. anaema in his 1928 publication The butterflies and moths of New Zealand. In 1988 J. S. Dugdale placed this species in the genus Tingena. The male lectotype is held at the Natural History Museum, London.

== Description ==
Meyrick originally described this species as follows:

Fore wings pale whitish-ochreous, with fine scattered fuscous scales, a basal streak on costa, a bar from anal angle, and sometimes a mark on fold dark fuscous; hind wings grey; thorax dark fuscous, with a small pale lateral spot.

Meyrick described the male of the species in more detail as follows:

Male. — 13 1/2-14 1/2 mm. Head whitish-ochreous, finely and closelyirrorated with dark fuscous. Palpi pale whitish-ochreous, externally irrorated with dark fuscous except at apex of joints. Antennae whitish-ochreous, obscurely annulated with dark fuscous. Thorax dark fuscous, with a small whitish-ochreous lateral spot. Abdomen grey. Anterior and middle legs dark fuscous, with ochreous-whitish rings at apex of joints; posterior legs ochreous-whitish. Forewings moderate, costa moderately arched, apex blunt-pointed, hindmargin very obliquely rounded; very pale whitish-ochreous, with fine scattered light fuscous scales; basal third of costa broadly dark fuscous; a short inwardly oblique dark fuscous mark on fold at 1/3, sometimes obsolete; a cloudy oblique dark fuscous bar from disc beyond middle to anal angle : cilia very pale whitish-ochreous, with lines of grey points, forming a broader dark grey shade before tips. Hindwings grey, darker posteriorly; cilia light grey.

Meyrick stated that this species could be distinguished from its close relatives by the dark colouration on its head as well as on its thorax except for a small lateral patch. The forewings have a dull appearance as a result of fine brown speckles, visible under a microscope.

== Distribution ==
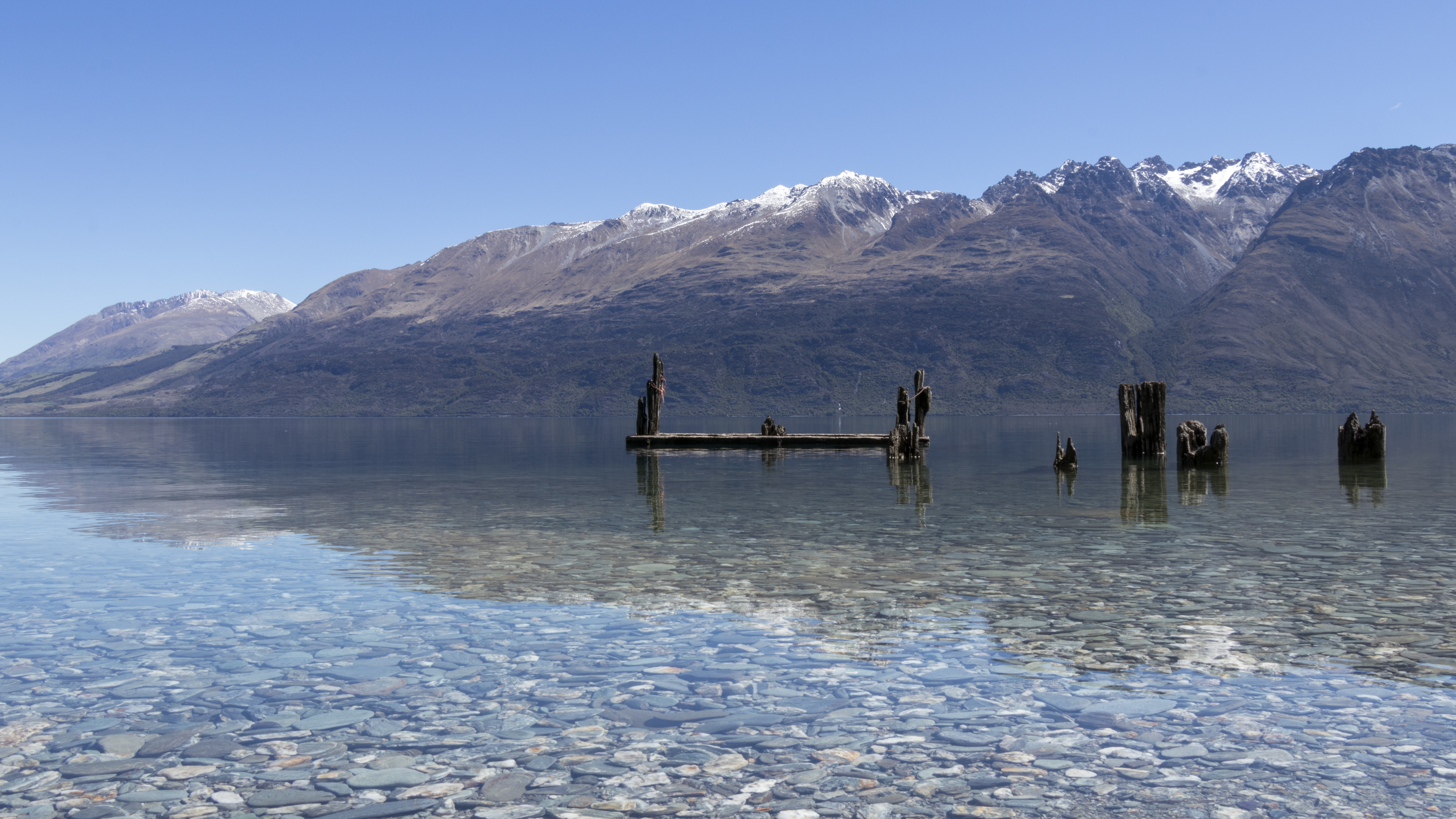
Lake Wakatipu, type locality of T. anaema.

It is endemic to New Zealand. This species has been observed in Invercargill, Stewart Island and Lake Wakatipu.

== Behaviour ==
The adults of this species are on the wing in December.
