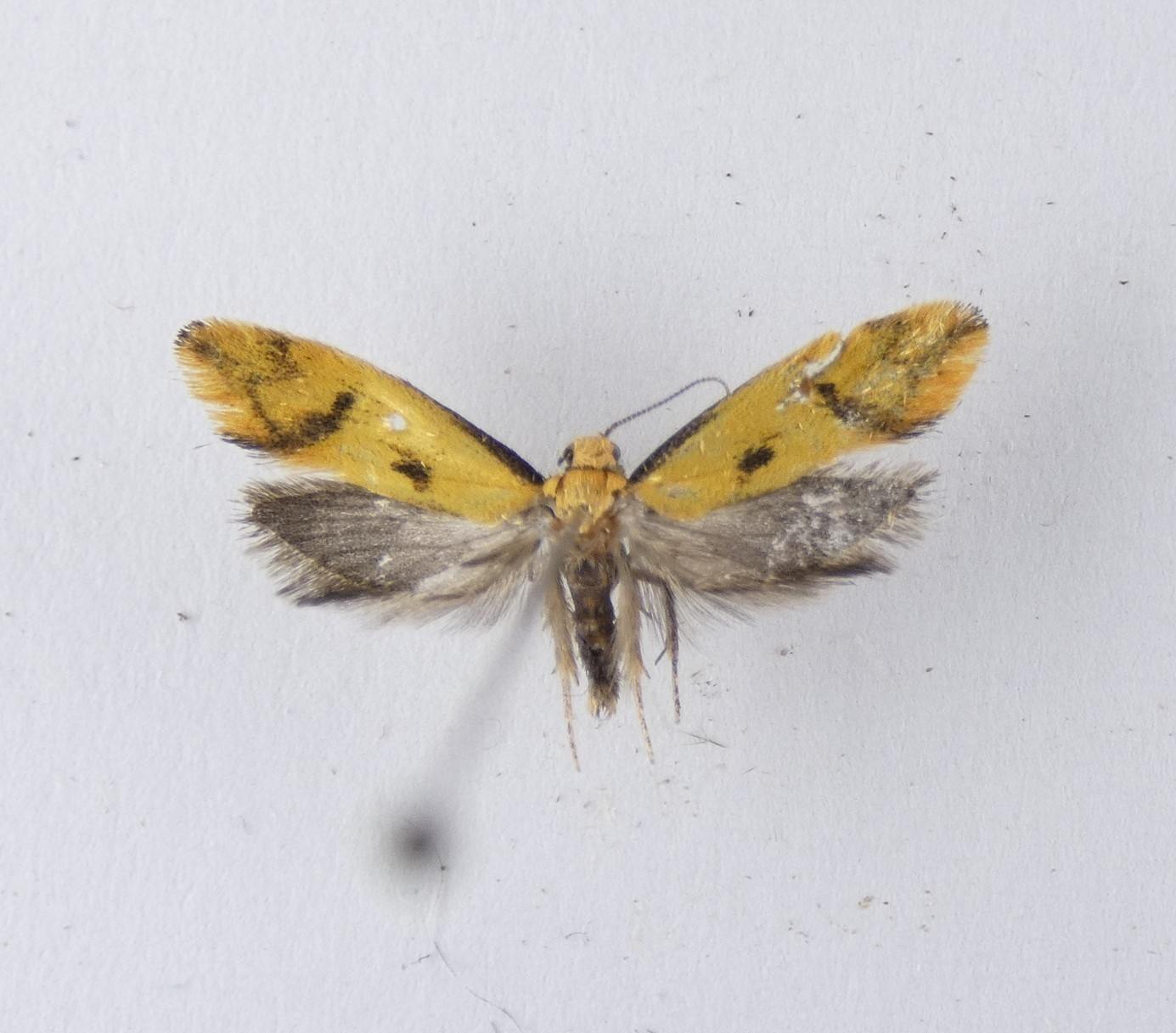

Scientific classification
- Kingdom: Animalia
- Phylum: Arthropoda
- Clade: Pancrustacea
- Class: Insecta
- Order: Lepidoptera
- Family: Oecophoridae
- Genus: Tingena
- Species: T. actinias

Binomial name
- Tingena actinias (Meyrick, 1901)

Synonyms
- Borkhausenia actinias Meyrick, 1901; Borkhausenia armigerella (Walker, 1864)

= Tingena actinias =

Species of moth, endemic to New Zealand

Tingena actinias is a species of moth in the family Oecophoridae. It is endemic to New Zealand and is found on the North and South Islands. The larvae of this species are leaf litter feeders. The preferred habitat of this species is shrubland and it has also been observed in gumland heaths and in beech forest.

== Taxonomy ==
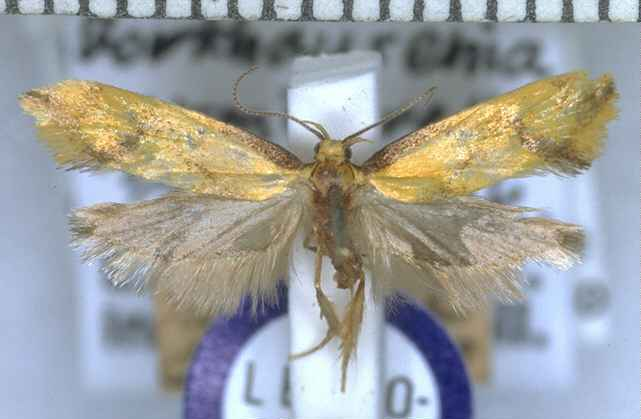
Tingena actinias male lectotype

This species was first described by Edward Meyrick in 1901 using four specimens collected by George Hudson in Wellington and named Borkhausenia actinias. In 1926 Alfred Philpott illustrated the male genitalia of this species but used the name Borkhausenia armigerella in his publication. In 1928 George Hudson discussed and illustrated this species in his publication The butterflies and moths of New Zealand as a variety of Borkhausenia armigerella (in the sense of Meyrick, not Walker). In 1988 J. S. Dugdale placed this species within the genus Tingena. This placement was confirmed in the Inventory of New Zealand Biodiversity. The male lectotype specimen is held at the Natural History Museum, London.

== Description ==
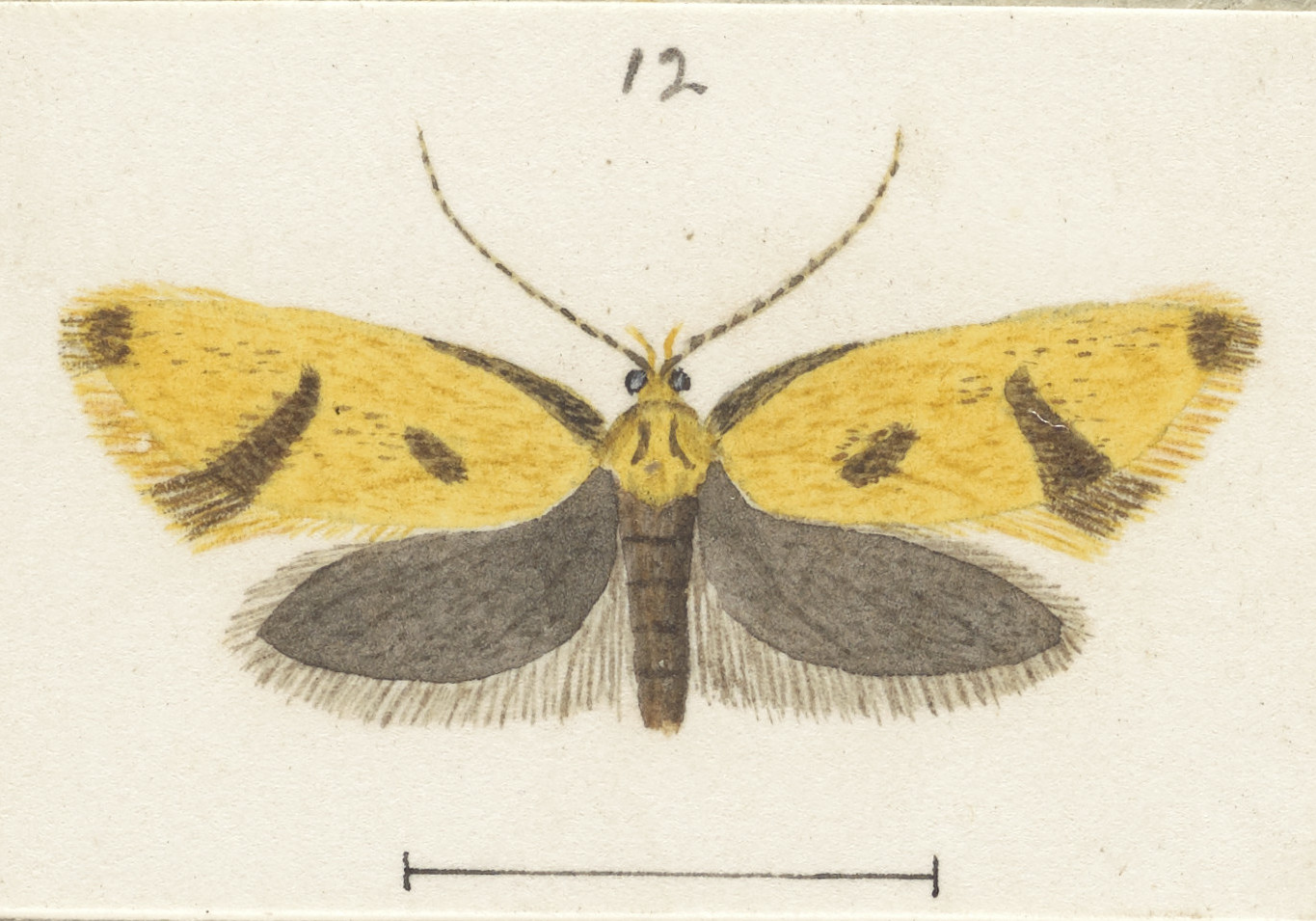
Illustration by George Hudson.

Meyrick describe the adults of this species as follows:

♂. 16-18 m.m. Head yellow. Palpi whitish, base of terminal joint, and second joint except towards apex dark fuscous externally. Antennae grey. Thorax yellow, shoulders dark fuscous. Abdomen dark grey. Forewings elongate, moderate, costa moderately arched, apex round-pointed, termen rather strongly oblique; yellow; a thick dark fuscous costal streak along basal third, posteriorly suffused; plical stigma well-marked, dark fuscous, placed in an undefined streak of dark fuscous irroration extending from disc above middle to dorsum before middle but sometimes almost obsolete; second discal stigma dark fuscous, connected with tornus by a wedge-shaped dark fuscous streak, a cloudy fuscous or dark fuscous curved subterminal line, sharply indented inwards beneath costa; a small fuscous or dark fuscous apical spot : cilia yellow, with thick dark fuscous bars at apex and tornus. Hindwings grey, becoming dark grey posteriorly; cilia grey.

== Distribution ==
This species is endemic to New Zealand and has been collected in both the North and the South Islands.

== Hosts and habitat ==
The larvae of this species are leaf litter feeders and the preferred habitat is shrubland. This species has also been observed in New Zealand gumland heaths and in beech forests.
