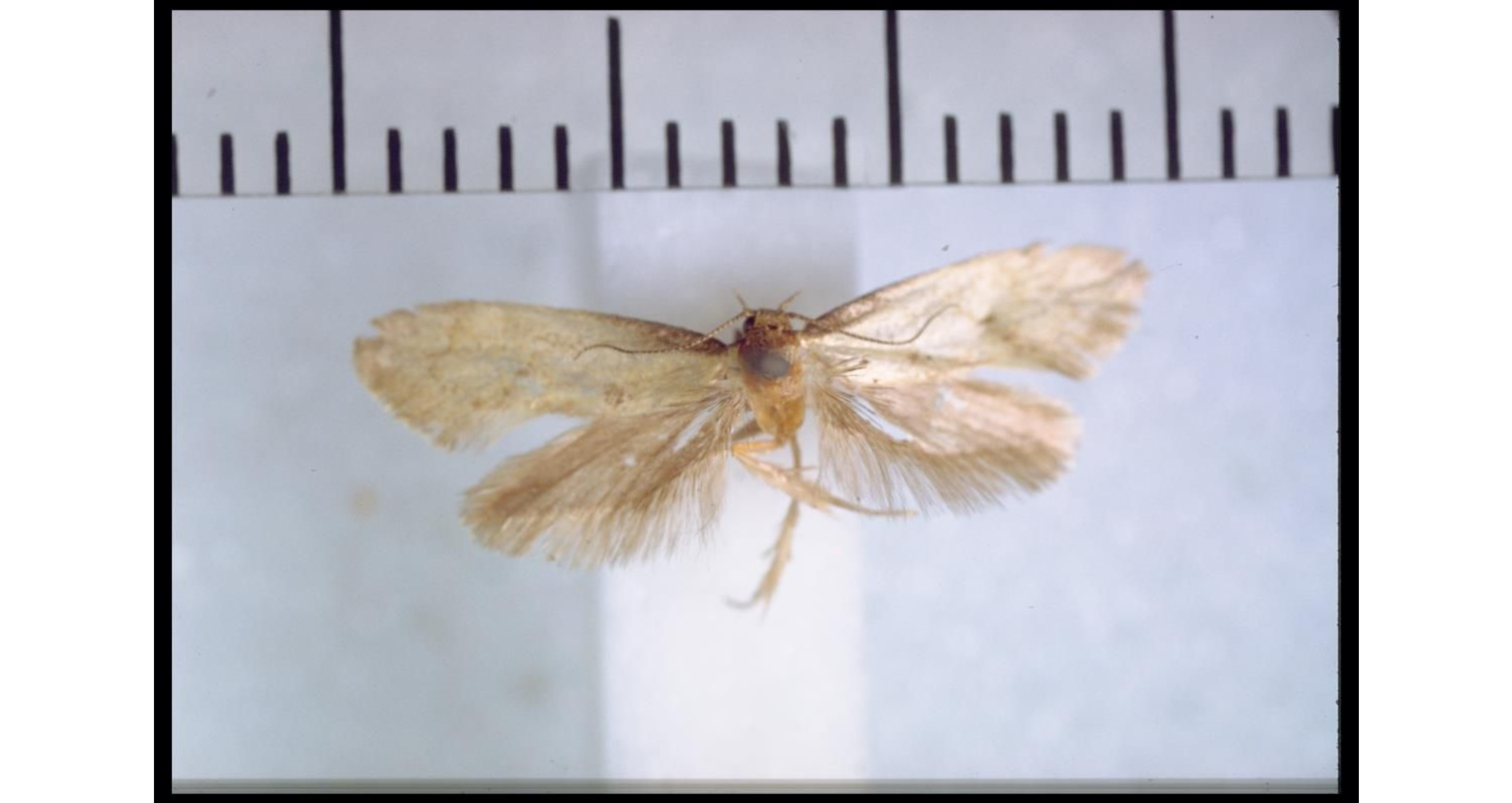
- Male holotype

Scientific classification
- Kingdom: Animalia
- Phylum: Arthropoda
- Class: Insecta
- Order: Lepidoptera
- Family: Oecophoridae
- Genus: Tingena
- Species: T. serena

Binomial name
- Tingena serena (Philpott, 1926)

Synonyms
- Borkhausenia serena Philpott, 1926; Borkhausenia comosaris Meyrick, 1931

= Tingena serena =

Species of moth, endemic to New Zealand

Tingena serena is a species of moth in the family Oecophoridae. It is endemic to New Zealand and has been observed in Southland and Dunedin. The adults of this species are on the wing in December and January.

== Taxonomy ==
This species was first described by Alfred Philpott using specimens collected in bush on a hillside in January at Waiau River at Sunnyside in Southland. Philpott originally named the species Borkhausenia serena. In that publication Philpott also studied and illustrated the genitalia of the male of this species. George Hudson discussed this species in his 1928 book The butterflies and moths of New Zealand under that name. In 1988 J. S. Dugdale synonymised B. comosaris with B. serena and then placed B. serena in the genus Tingena. The male holotype specimen is held in the New Zealand Arthropod Collection.

== Description ==
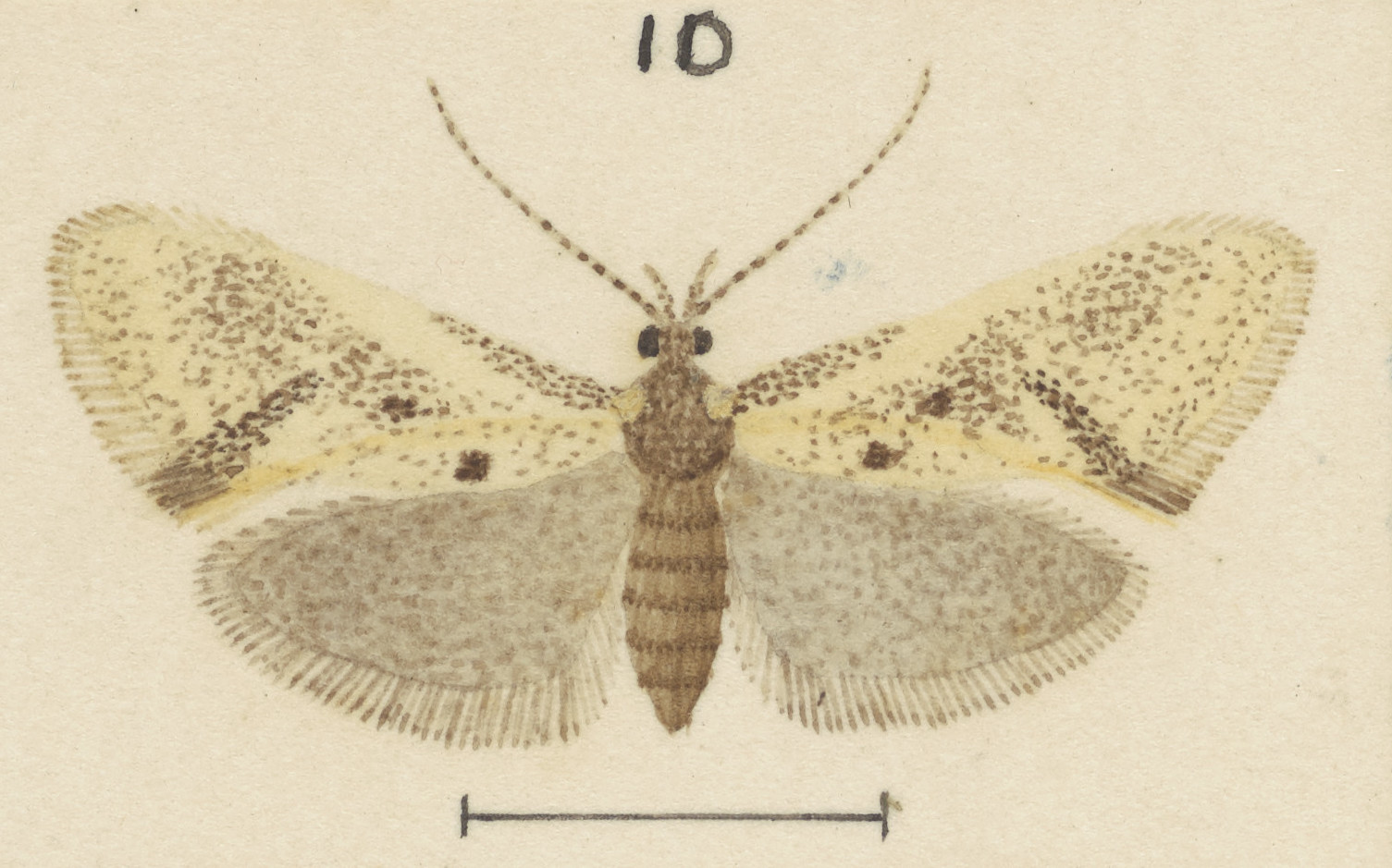
T. serena illustrated by George Hudson.

Philpott described this species as follows:

♂ ♀. 13–15 mm. Head and palpi whitish-ochreous mixed with brown. Antennae brown annulated with ochreous, ciliations in male ½. Thorax brown, apices of tegulae pale ochreous. Abdomen grey annulated with brown. Legs ochreous, more or less infuscated. Forewings moderate, costa moderately arched, apex rounded, termen very oblique, whitish-ochreous; costa rather broadly brown on basal ⅓; an irregular brown irroration all over wing, usually obsolete on dorsal region at base and beneath and following brown costal basal area; this brown irroration tends to form a spot above dorsum at before ½ and an inwardly-oblique striga from tornus; an angled subterminal brown line faintly indicated: fringes pale ochreous with several rows of dark points. Hindwings greyish-fuscous: fringes grey with an obscure darker basal line.

== Distribution ==
This species is endemic to New Zealand. This species has been observed in Southland and Dunedin.

== Behaviour ==
The adults of this species is on the wing in December and January.
