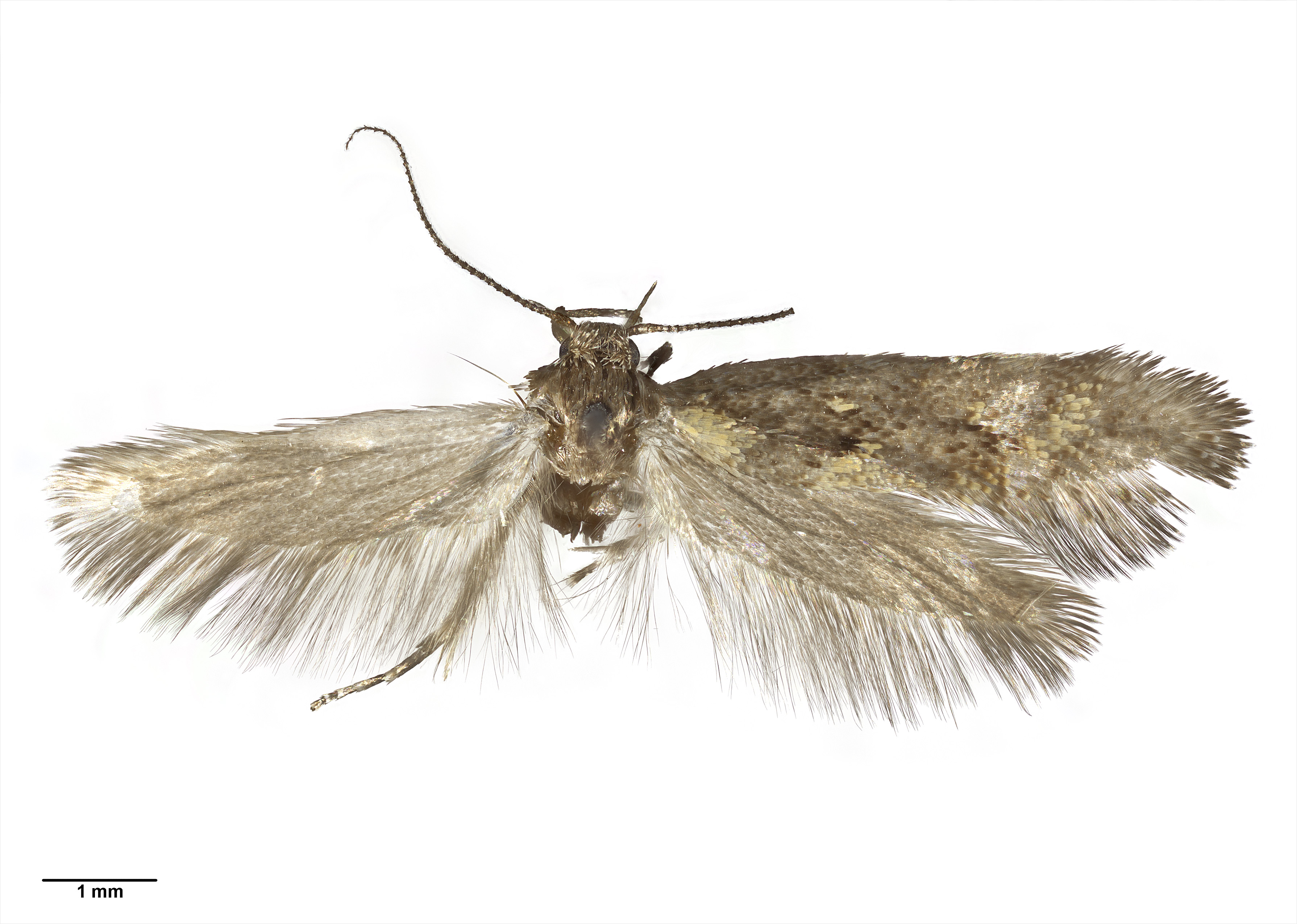

Scientific classification
- Kingdom: Animalia
- Phylum: Arthropoda
- Class: Insecta
- Order: Lepidoptera
- Family: Oecophoridae
- Genus: Tingena
- Species: T. aurata

Binomial name
- Tingena aurata (Philpott, 1931)

Synonyms
- Gymnobathra aurata Philpott, 1931

= Tingena aurata =

Species of moth, endemic to New Zealand

Tingena aurata is a species of moth in the family Oecophoridae. It is endemic to New Zealand. The adults of the species are on the wing in November and December.

== Taxonomy ==
This species was first described by Alfred Philpott in 1931 using specimens collected by Charles Edwin Clarke at Opoho, Dunedin, in November and December and named Gymnobathra aurata. In 1939 George Hudson discussed and illustrated this species in his book A supplement to the butterflies and moths of New Zealand using the same name. In 1988 J. S. Dugdale placed this species in the genus Tingena. The male holotype specimen is held at the Auckland War Memorial Museum.

== Description ==
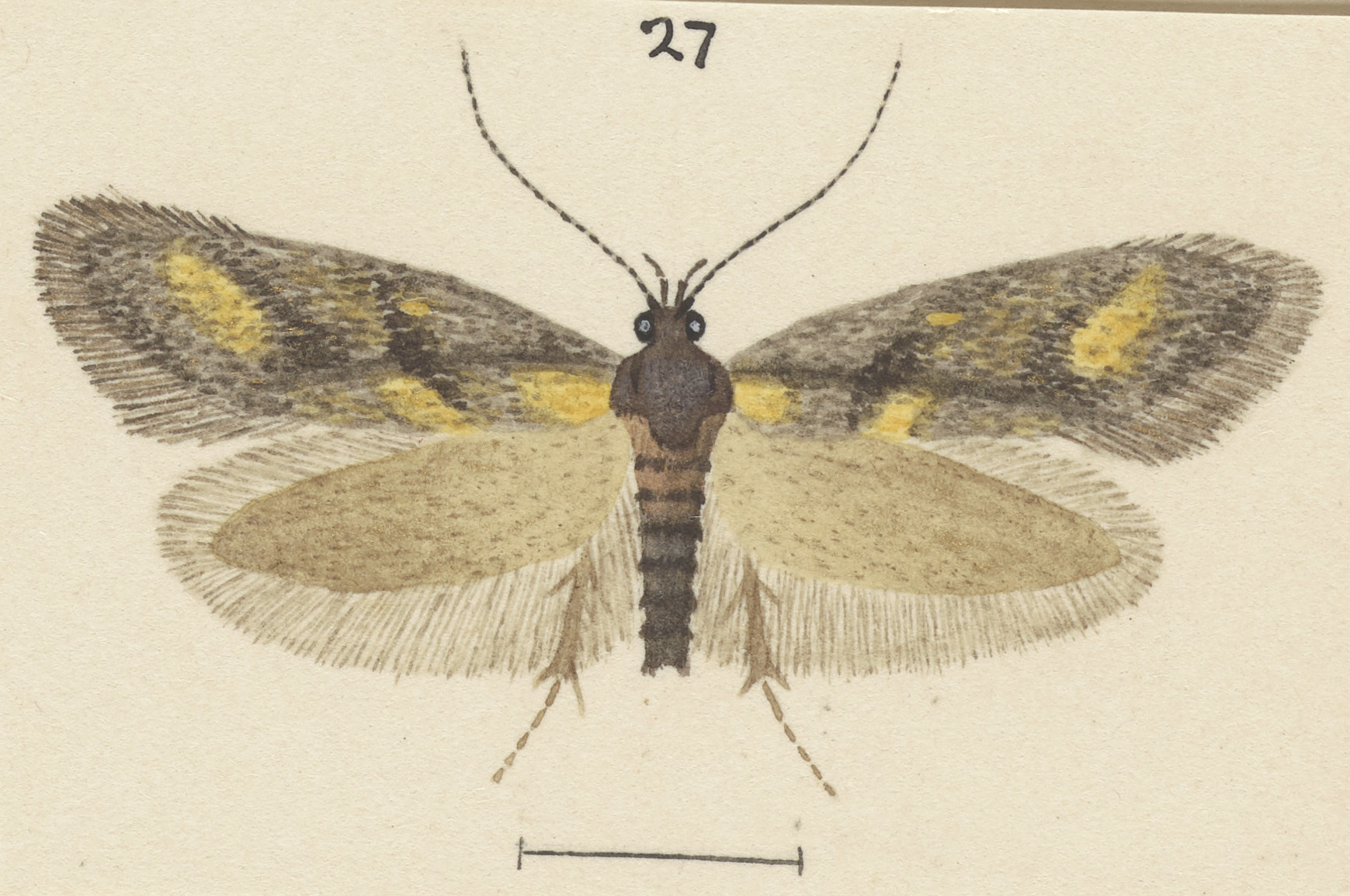
Illustration of T. aurata by George Hudson.

Philpott described the species as follows:

♂ ♀. 10–12 mm. Head, palpi and thorax purplish brown mixed with grey. Antennae fuscous, pubescent. Abdomen grey. Legs fuscous, posterior pair whitish grey, tarsi very obscurely annulated with paler. Forewings with costa slightly arched, apex broadly rounded, termen oblique; fuscous grey; some dark fuscous suffusion beneath costa at base; a large blotch of yellow beneath fold at base; a dark fuscous fascia with some admixture of yellow above fold from costa at ¼, slightly curved and not quite reaching dorsum with its extremity resting on a fairly large dorsal patch of yellow; an outwardly oblique dark fuscous fascia mixed with yellow from costa at ½ coalescing above tornus with a similar but inwardly oblique fascia from costa at ¾; a very obscure terminal fascia of the same colours; fringes fuscous grey sprinkled with dark fuscous and white. Hindwings and fringes fuscous grey.

== Distribution ==
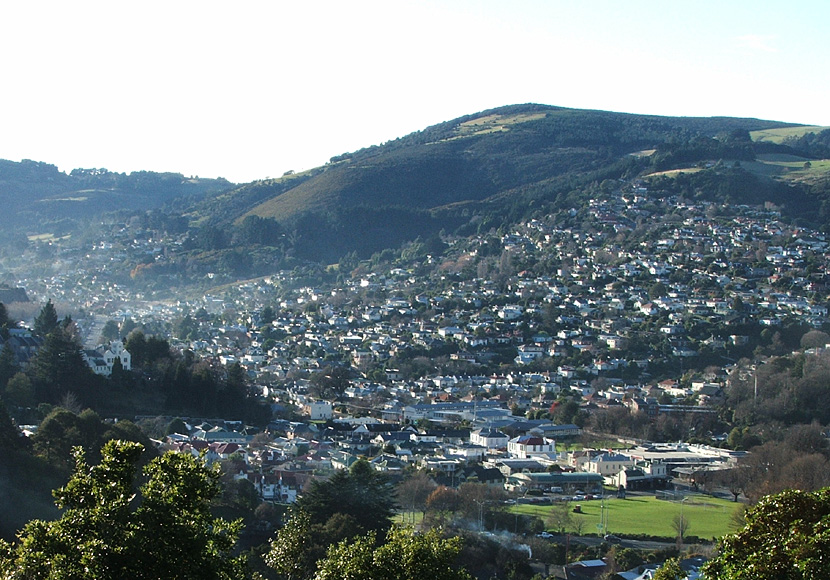
Opoho, type locality of T. aurata.

This species is endemic to New Zealand.

== Behaviour ==
This species is on the wing in November and December.
