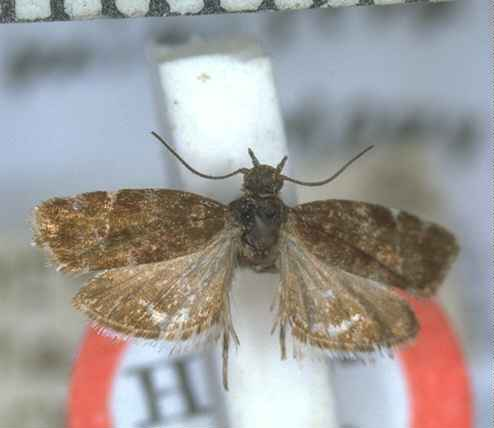
- Male holotype

Scientific classification
- Kingdom: Animalia
- Phylum: Arthropoda
- Clade: Pancrustacea
- Class: Insecta
- Order: Lepidoptera
- Family: Choreutidae
- Genus: Asterivora
- Species: A. ministra

Binomial name
- Asterivora ministra (Meyrick, 1912)

Synonyms
- Simaethis ministra Meyrick, 1912

= Asterivora ministra =

Species of moth

Asterivora ministra is a species of moth in the family Choreutidae. It is endemic to New Zealand and has been observed at Mount Holdsworth and Mount Arthur. This species inhabits alpine native herbage above the tree line. The adults are on the wing in February.

== Taxonomy ==
This species was first described by Edward Meyrick, using specimens collected by George Hudson at Mount Holdsworth, and named Simaethis ministra. In 1928 George Hudson discussed this species under that name in his book The butterflies and moths of New Zealand. In 1979 J. S. Dugdale placed this species within the genus Asterivora. In 1988 Dugdale confirmed this placement. The male holotype specimen, collected at Mount Holdsworth, is held at the Natural History Museum, London.

== Description ==
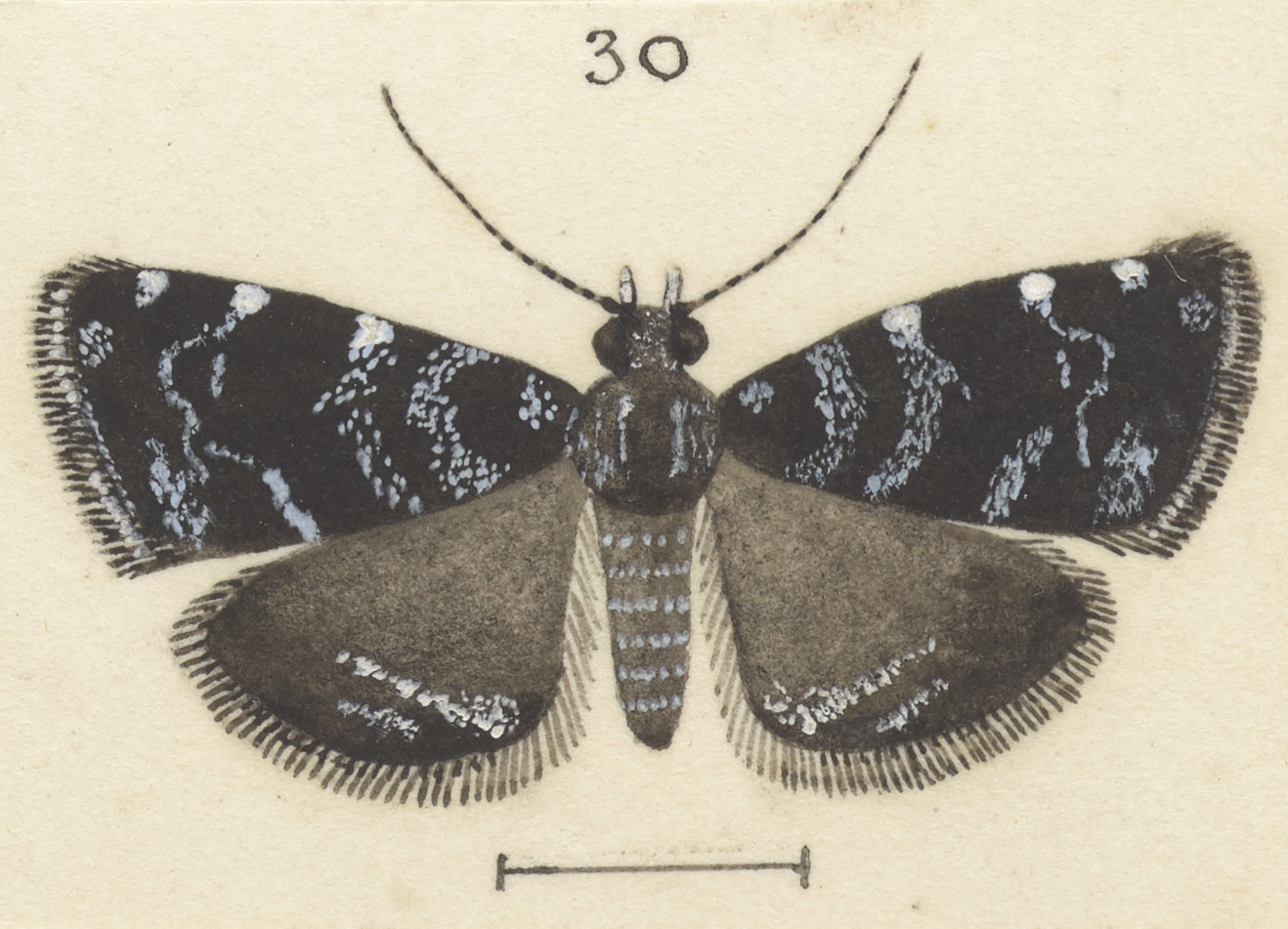
Illustration of A. ministra by George Hudson.

Meyrick described this species as follows:

♂. 9 mm. Head dark fuscous, face sprinkled with white. Palpi with whorls of dark-fuscous white-tipped scales, base white. Antennae dark fuscous, shortly pubescent-ciliated. Thorax dark fuscous. Abdomen dark fuscous, segmental margins partially white. Forewings suboblong, costa moderately arched anteriorly, apex obtuse, termen slightly rounded, somewhat oblique; dark bronzy-fuscous; five very undefined irregular transverse shades of white irroration, first three rather curved or bent, fourth forming a clear white spot on costa beyond middle and then a fine silvery quadrangular loop passing behind a transverse linear discal mark of white irroration, fifth straight, interrupted above middle; two or three silvery-metallic scales before termen above middle: cilia white with dark-fuscous shade (imperfect). Hindwings light fuscous, becoming darker towards termen; dorsal half with scattered white scales; a well-marked irregular white streak extending across dorsal half of wing from disc at ¾ nearly to tornus, its lower half approximated to termen; cilia white, with fuscous subbasal and post-median shades.

This species is very similar in appearance to A. microlitha and analoga. A. ministra can be distinguished as its antennae are fully dark fuscous, it has broader forewings with costa more arched and less defined white markings while on the hindwings, the white streak is broader and less defined.

== Distribution ==
This species is endemic to New Zealand. Along with the type locality of Mount Holdsworth in Wellington, this species has also been collected at Mount Arthur.

== Habitat ==
It inhabits alpine native herbage above the tree line.

== Behaviour ==
The adults of this species is on the wing in February.
