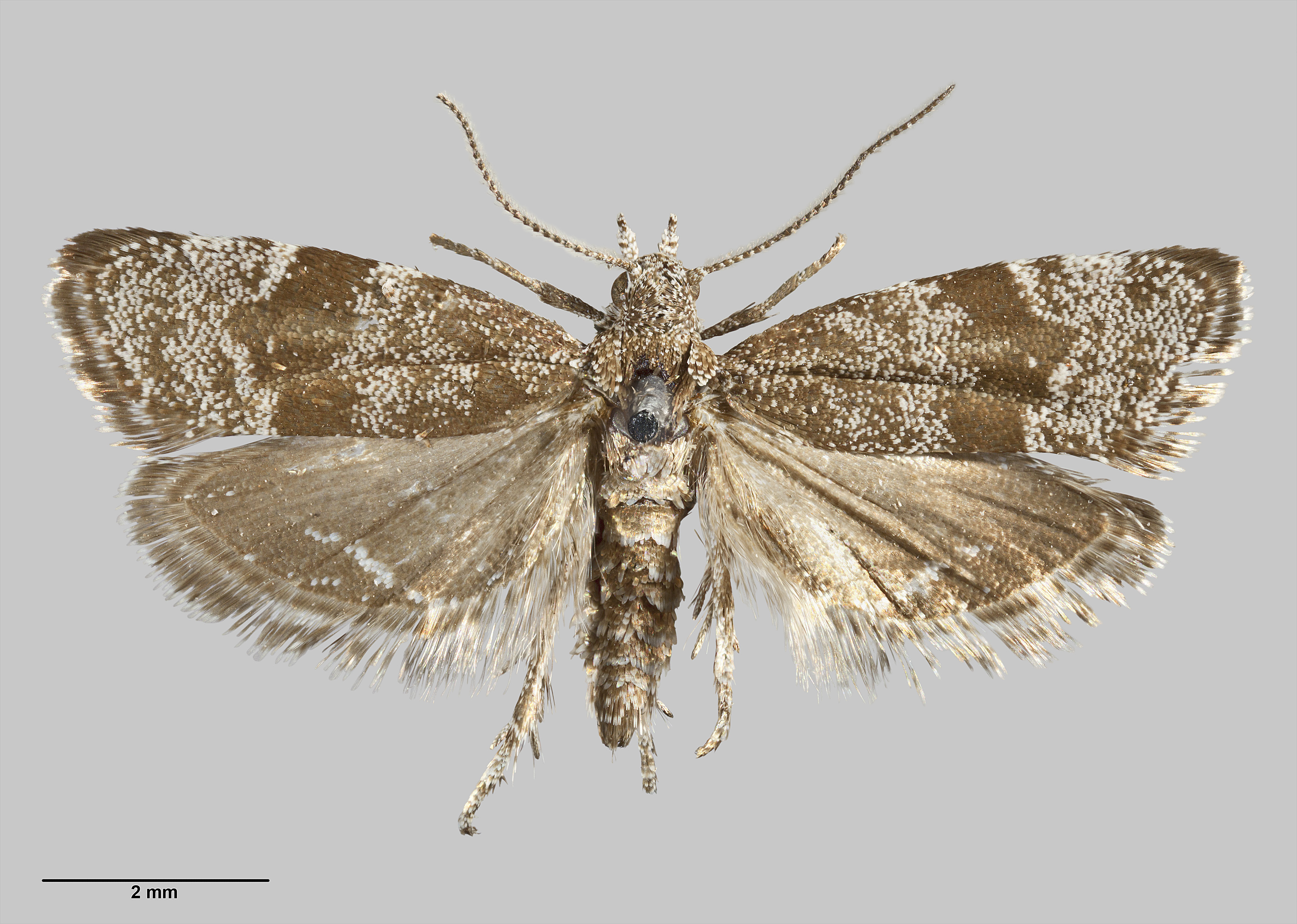
- Male holotype specimen held at Auckland War Memorial Museum.

Scientific classification
- Kingdom: Animalia
- Phylum: Arthropoda
- Clade: Pancrustacea
- Class: Insecta
- Order: Lepidoptera
- Family: Choreutidae
- Genus: Asterivora
- Species: A. fasciata

Binomial name
- Asterivora fasciata (Philpott, 1930)

Synonyms
- Simaethis fasciata Philpott, 1930

= Asterivora fasciata =

Species of moth

Asterivora fasciata is a species of moth in the family Choreutidae. It is endemic to New Zealand and has been found at Arthur's Pass. The larvae of this species have been reared on Celmisia densiflora and adults are on the wing in January. In 2025 this species was classified as "data deficient" under the New Zealand Threat Classification System.

== Taxonomy ==
This species was first described by Alfred Philpott in 1930, using specimens collected by C. E. Clarke at Arthur's Pass in January, and named Simaethis fasciata. In 1939 George Hudson discussed and illustrated this species under that name. In 1979 J. S. Dugdale placed this species within the genus Asterivora. In 1988 Dugdale confirmed this placement. The male holotype specimen, collected in the Arthur's Pass, is held at the Auckland War Memorial Museum.

== Description ==
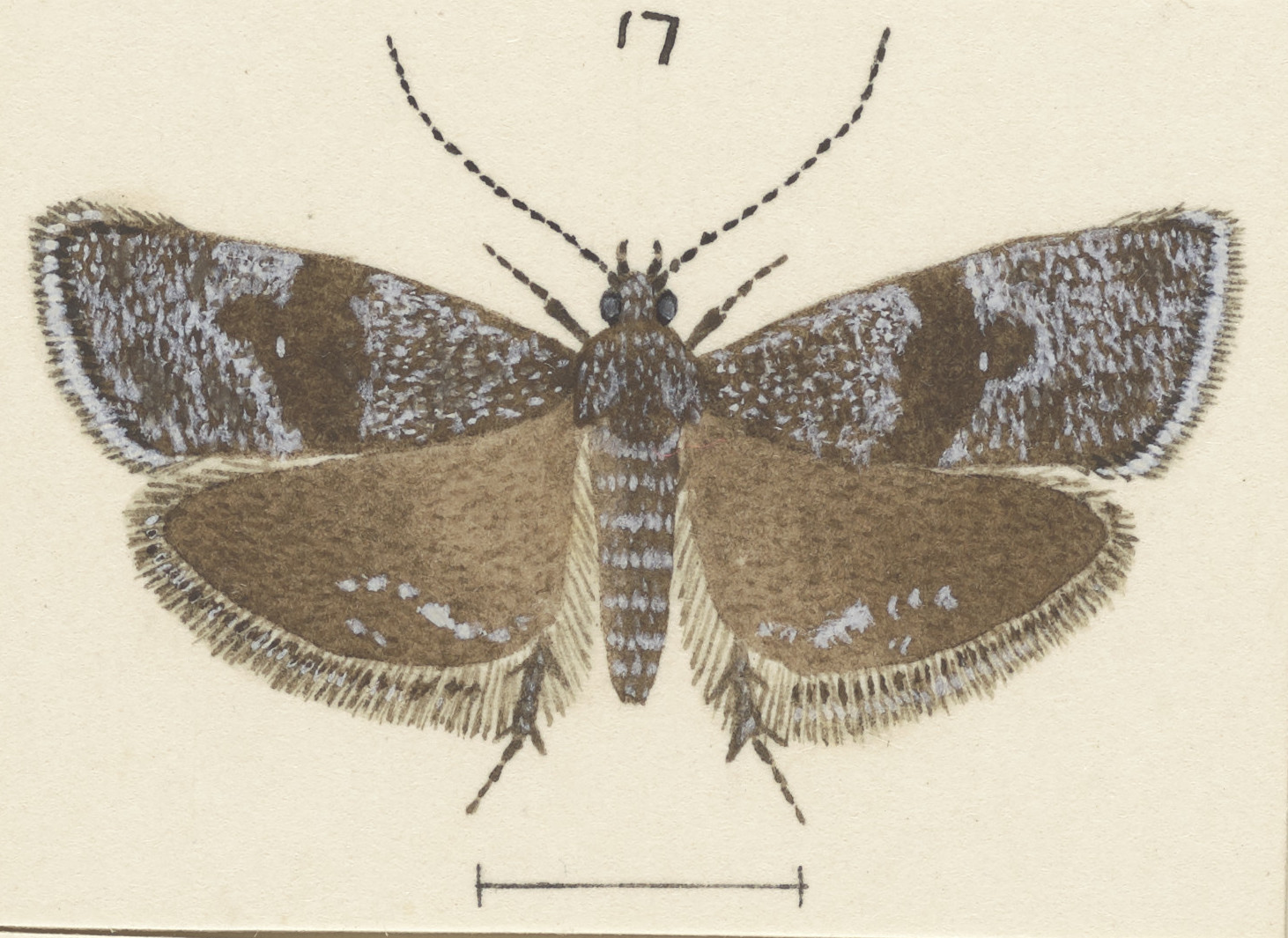
Illustration of A. fasciata by George Hudson.

Philpott described this species as follows:

♂♀ . 10-11 mm. Head and thorax bronzy brown sprinkled with white scales. Palpi brown closely annulated with white, second segment roundly tufted beneath. Antennae black annulated with white, ciliations in ♂ 2. Abdomen bronzy brown sprinkled with white. Legs bronzy brown mixed with whitish. Forewings with costa slightly arched, apex subrectangular, termen almost straight, oblique; bronzy brown; densely irrorated with white except on broad median angled band: fringes bronzy brown, subbasal line and tips white. Hindwings pale bronzy brown, greyish towards base; an interrupted white fascia from tornus along termen to about 1/4, thence diverging into disc and reaching about middle of wing: fringes as in forewings.

Philpott stated that this species is distinguishable by the dark median band on the forewings.

== Behaviour ==
The adults of this species is on the wing in January.

== Hosts ==
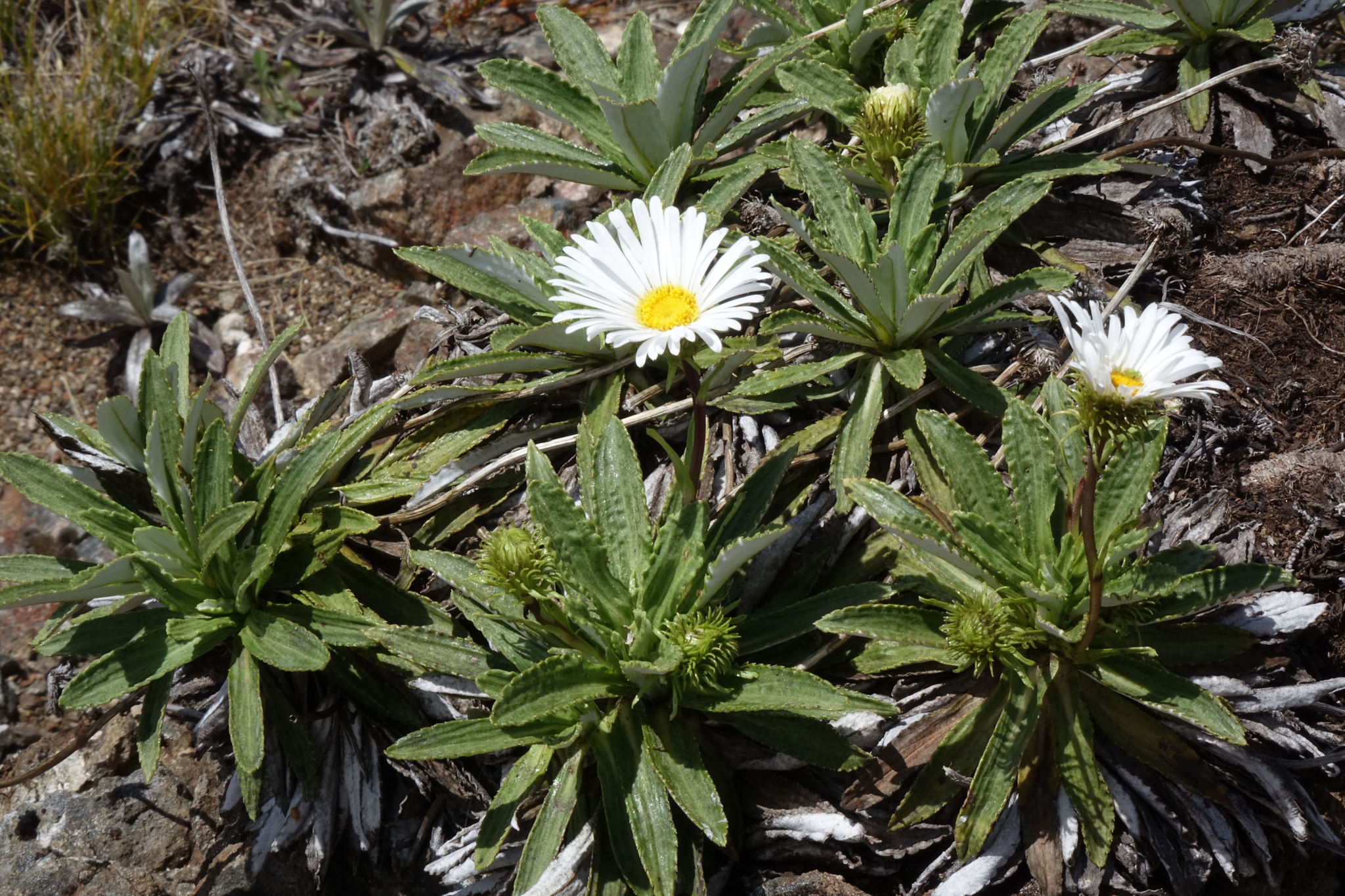
Larval host species Celmisia densiflora.

The larvae of this species have been reared on Celmisia densiflora.

== Conservation status ==
In 2025 this species was classified by the New Zealand Department of Conservation as "data deficient" under the New Zealand Threat Classification System.
