= Asterivora lampadias =

Scientific classification
- Kingdom: Animalia
- Phylum: Arthropoda
- Class: Insecta
- Order: Lepidoptera
- Family: Choreutidae
- Genus: Asterivora
- Species: A. lampadias

Binomial name
- Asterivora lampadias (Meyrick, 1907)

Synonyms
- Choreutis lampadias Meyrick, 1907

Species of moth

Asterivora lampadias is a species of moth of the family Choreutidae. It is found in Australia, including Tasmania.

It is found in subalpine and alpine habitats.

Larvae have been reared on the foliage of Brachycome, Helichrysum and other herbaceous plant species.
