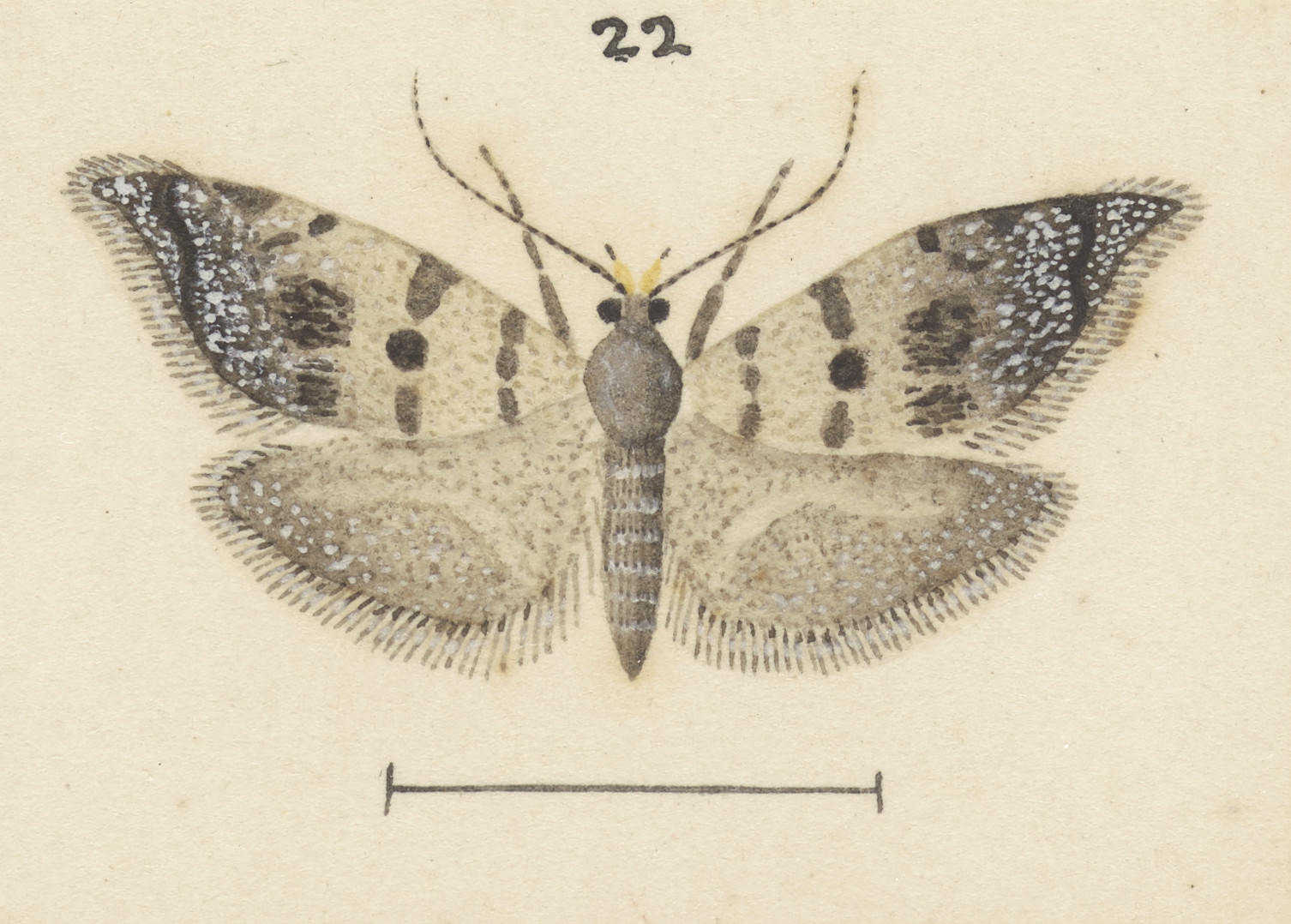
- Illustration of female

Scientific classification
- Kingdom: Animalia
- Phylum: Arthropoda
- Class: Insecta
- Order: Lepidoptera
- Family: Choreutidae
- Genus: Asterivora
- Species: A. tillyardi

Binomial name
- Asterivora tillyardi (Philpott, 1924)

Synonyms
- Simaethis tillyardi Philpott, 1924

= Asterivora tillyardi =

Species of moth

Asterivora tillyardi is a species of moth in the family Choreutidae. It is endemic to New Zealand and collected at Aoraki / Mount Cook. Adults of this species are on the wing in March.

== Taxonomy ==
This species was first described by Alfred Philpott in 1924, collected by Dr. R. J. Tillyard on Aoraki / Mount Cook at 2,500 ft in March, and named Simaethis tillyardi. George Hudson discussed and illustrated this species in his 1928 publication The butterflies and moths of New Zealand. In 1979 J. S. Dugdale placed this species within the genus Asterivora. In 1988 Dugdale confirmed this placement. The male holotype specimen, collected at Mount Cook, is held at the New Zealand Arthropod Collection.

== Description ==
Philpott described this species as follows:

♀. 17 ½ mm. Head and thorax white mixed with pale fuscous. Palpi, second segment strongly tufted beneath, white mixed with fuscous, terminal segment white mixed with black. Antennae black annulated with white. Abdomen bronzy-fuscous, suffusedly annulated with whitish. Legs whitish mixed with bronzy-fuscous, apices of tibiae and tarsi annulated with white. Forewings moderate, costa hardly arched, apex pointed, termen markedly sinuate, oblique; pale bronzy-fuscous mixed with dark fuscous; markings snow-white; a small basal patch; a broad band before middle, projecting outwardly in disc and touching following band; an outwardly - oblique fascia from costa beyond middle, coalescing in disc with broad band at ¼ and terminating on tornus; a terminal band, dilated at apex; in the dark-fuscous discal area and above dorsum at ¾ are a few shining steel-blue scales: fringes on termen pale bronzy - fuscous with three white lines, on costa darker fuscous, with median white line. Hindwings greyish-fuscous; apical ⅓ suffusedly white: fringes fuscous; a broad median band and tips white.

== Distribution ==
This species is endemic to New Zealand.

== Behaviour ==
Adults of this species are on the wing in March.
