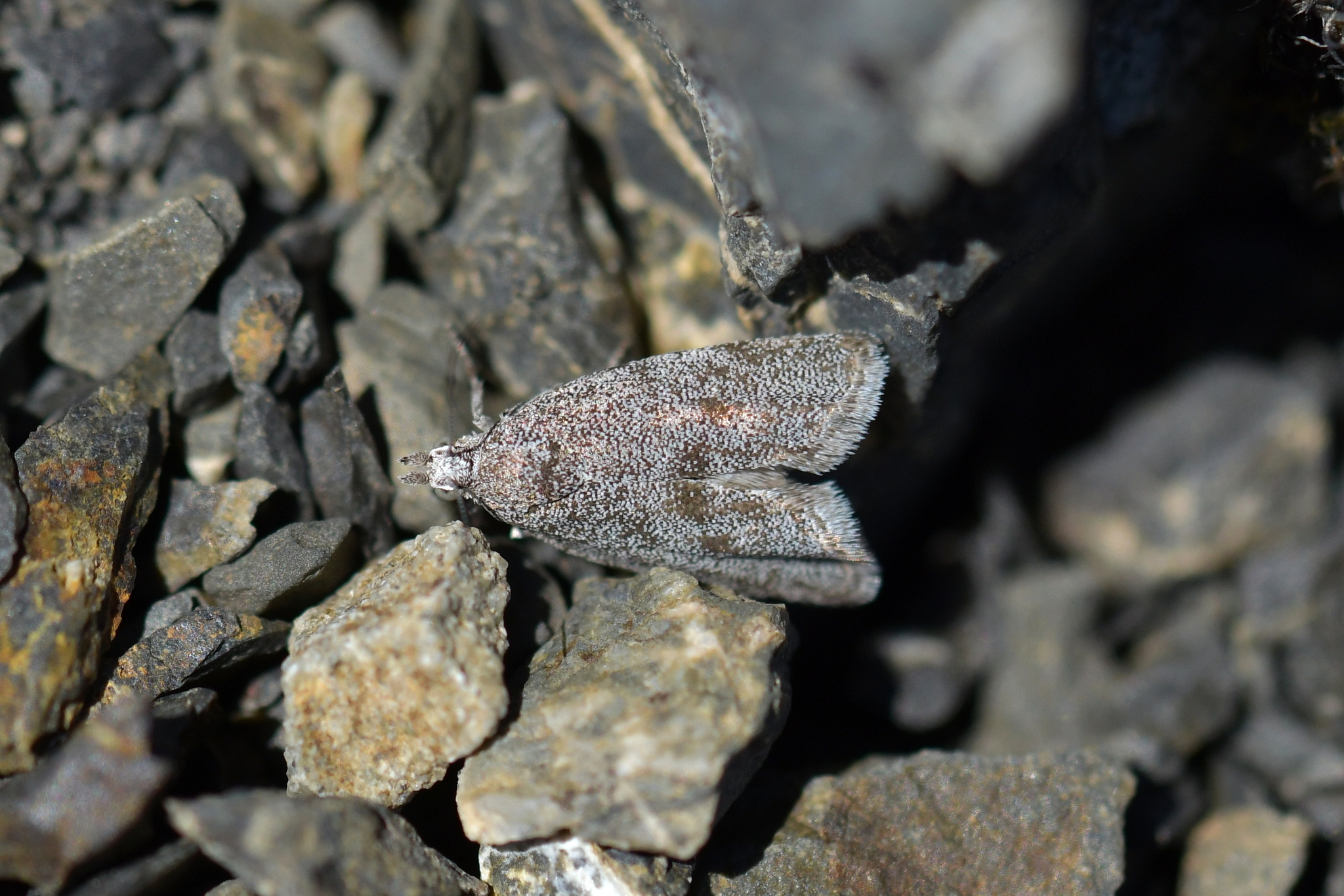

Scientific classification
- Kingdom: Animalia
- Phylum: Arthropoda
- Class: Insecta
- Order: Lepidoptera
- Family: Choreutidae
- Genus: Asterivora
- Species: A. barbigera

Binomial name
- Asterivora barbigera (Meyrick, 1915)

Synonyms
- Simaethis barbigera Meyrick, 1915

= Asterivora barbigera =

Species of moth

Asterivora barbigera is a moth in the family Choreutidae. It is endemic to New Zealand and is found in the southern half of the South Island. It inhabits open mountain sides and adults are on the wing in November to January.

== Taxonomy ==
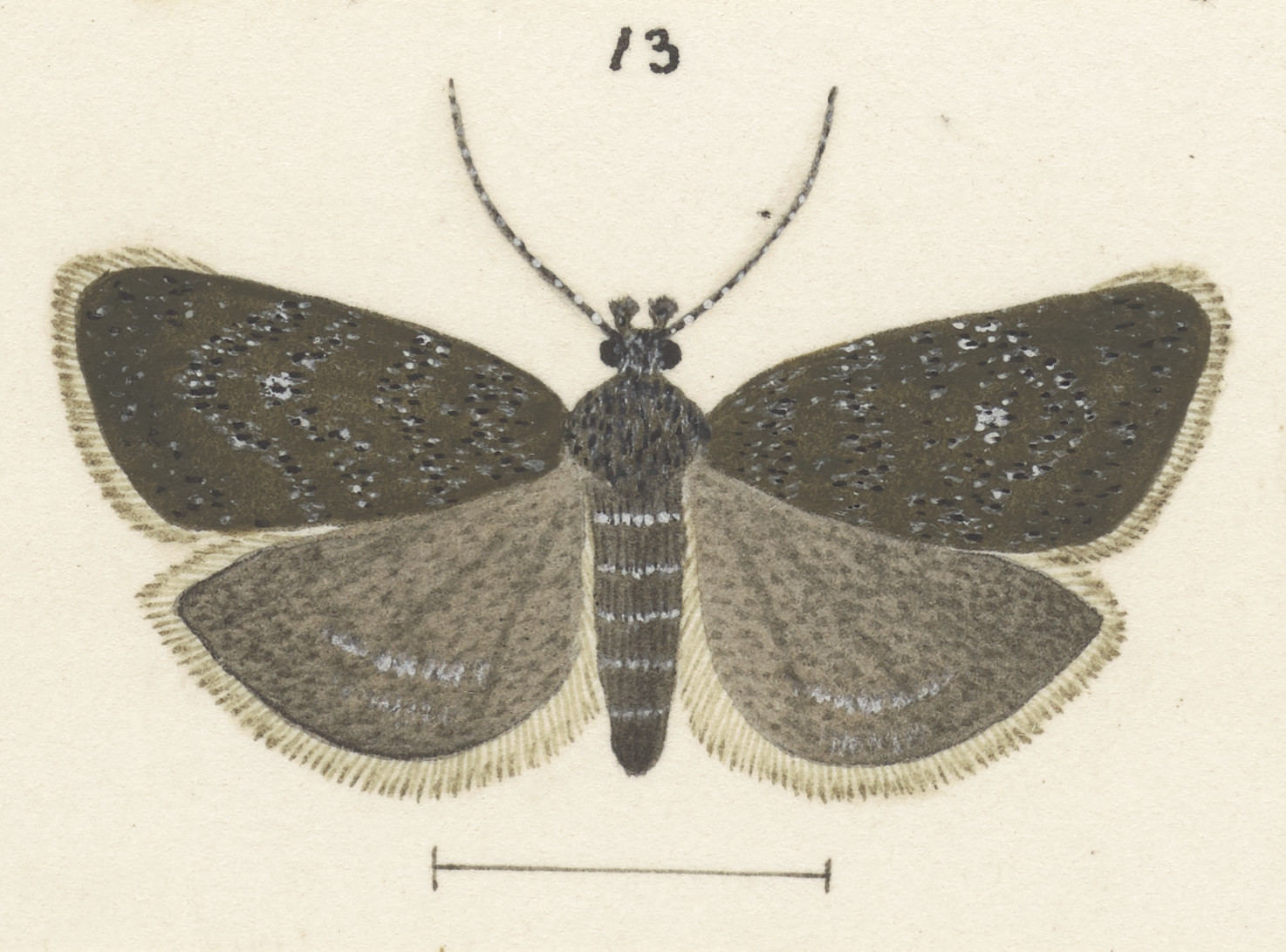
Illustration of male

This species was first described by Edward Meyrick using a specimen collected by Alfred Philpott at Mount Cleughearn in the Hunter Mountains in January and named Simaethis barbigera. In 1927 Alfred Philpott studied the male genitalia of this species. George Hudson discussed and illustrated this species in his 1928 publication The butterflies and moths of New Zealand. In 1979 J. S. Dugdale placed this species within the genus Asterivora. In 1988 Dugdale confirmed this placement. The female holotype is held at the Natural History Museum, London.

== Description ==
The wingspan is about 19 mm. The head is bronzy irrorated with white and dark fuscous and the thorax is greyish-bronze sprinkled with white. The abdomen is bronzy-grey, although the segmental margins are white. The forewings are elongate, posteriorly dilated, the costa gently arched, the apex obtuse, the termen bowed and oblique. They are greyish-bronze, irregularly irrorated with white, especially towards the costa and on a terminal band. There is a white transverse dot on the end of the cell. A second line is formed of white irroration which is strongly curved outwards. The hindwings are light grey.

This species is variable in the amount of white markings on its wings.

== Distribution ==
This species is endemic to New Zealand. It is found in the southern half of the South Island and has been observed in the Hunter Mountains, the Hump range in Fiordland and at Bold Peak.

== Habitat ==
This species inhabits open mountain sides.

== Behaviour ==
The adults of this species are on the wing in November to January.
