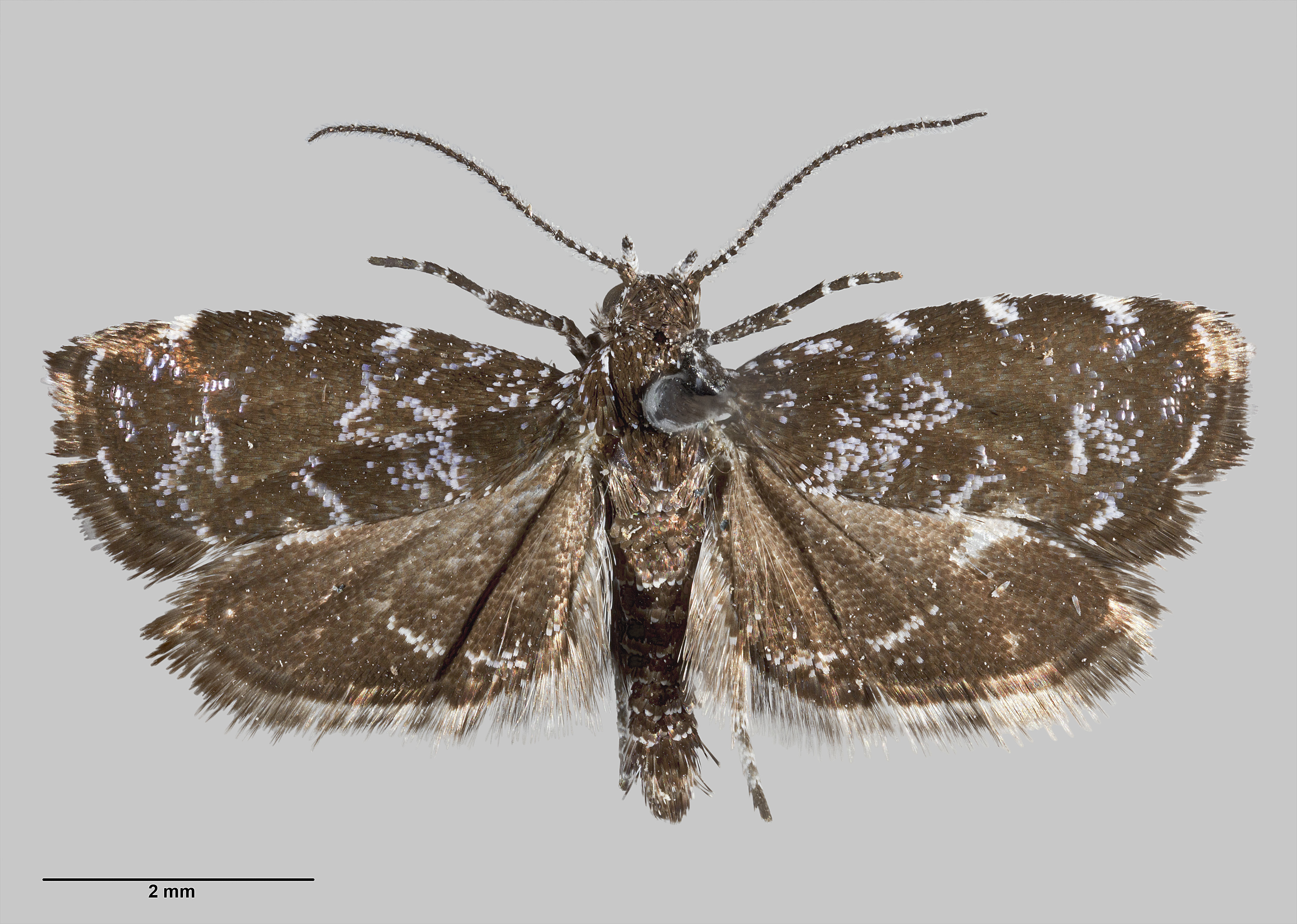
- Asterivora chatuidea

Scientific classification
- Domain: Eukaryota
- Kingdom: Animalia
- Phylum: Arthropoda
- Class: Insecta
- Order: Lepidoptera
- Family: Choreutidae
- Genus: Asterivora; Dugdale, 1979

= Asterivora =

Genus of moths

Asterivora is a genus of moths in the family Choreutidae. Asterivora was described by J. S. Dugdale in 1979. The type species is Asterivora combinatana.

== Description ==
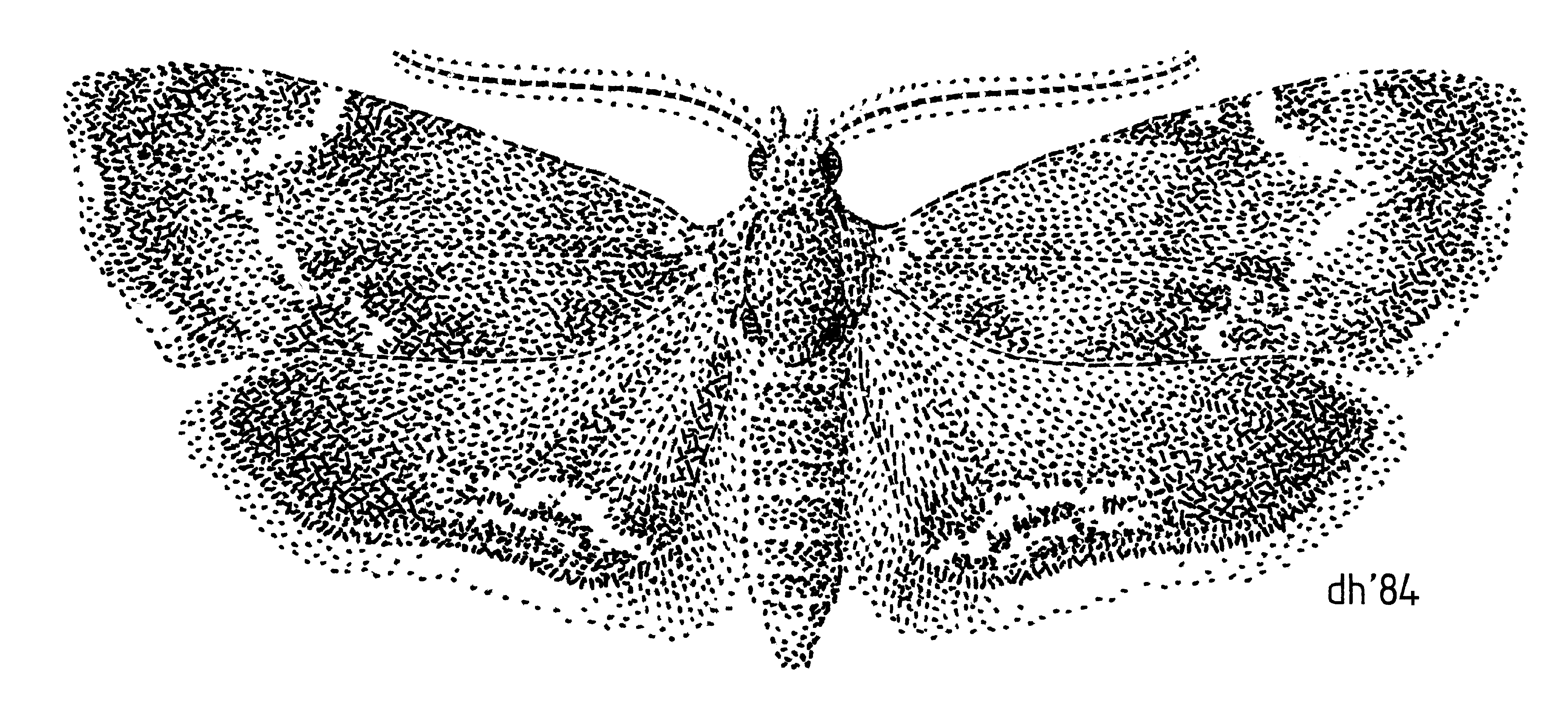
Type species Asterivora combinatana.

Dugdale described the genus as follows:

Colour pattern basically black, or dark brown, and white; labial palpi, legs, and abdomen strongly barr·ed in black and white. Head : frons and vertex smooth-scaled, scales white-tipped; ocellus distant from compound eye, which is wider than deep; compound eye surrounded by a nude strip; labial palpus with 2nd segment tufted ventrally, apical segment short, stout, sometimes concealed by scales of 2nd segment; antenna in c3 short setulose, or long setulose, or with a segmental whorl of long, fine, erect setulae; dorsum of each segment with black-and-white banded scales. Middle and hind tibiae with conspicuous tufts, tarsi with long, straw-coloured scales ventrally. Forewings with or without iridescent scale patches. Venation typical of subfamily Choreutinae; forewing veins R4 and R5 separate or stalked (urbana Clarke, lampadias Meyrick), vein CuA2 from discal cell either opposite origin of vein R2 or proximad of R2, but never arising before 3/4 length of discal cell.

== Hosts ==
Larvae of species within the genus Asterivora feed on Asteraceae, mainly on species in the genera Celmisia and Olearia. The larvae feed either on the underside of Celmisia or Olearia leaves or in a loose cocoon made of silk and hidden in a rolled leaf of species in the genus Brachyglottis. One species, A. tillyardi, feeds on species of Raoulia growing in alpine habitats at altitudes above 1400 m.

== Behaviour ==
Adults of species within this genus are day flying.

== Species ==
- Asterivora albifasciata (Philpott, 1924)
- Asterivora analoga (Meyrick, 1912)
- Asterivora antigrapha (Meyrick, 1911)
- Asterivora barbigera (Meyrick, 1915)
- Asterivora chatuidea (Clarke, 1926)
- Asterivora colpota (Meyrick, 1911)
- Asterivora combinatana (Walker, 1863)
- Asterivora exocha (Meyrick, 1907)
- Asterivora fasciata (Philpott, 1930)
- Asterivora homotypa (Meyrick, 1907)
- Asterivora inspoliata (Philpott, 1930)
- Asterivora iochondra (Meyrick, 1911)
- Asterivora lampadias (Meyrick, 1907)
- Asterivora marmarea (Meyrick, 1888)
- Asterivora microlitha (Meyrick, 1888)
- Asterivora ministra (Meyrick, 1912)
- Asterivora nivescens (Philpott, 1926)
- Asterivora oleariae Dugdale, 1979
- Asterivora symbolaea (Meyrick, 1888)
- Asterivora tillyardi (Philpott, 1924)
- Asterivora tristis (Philpott, 1930)
- Asterivora urbana (Clarke, 1926)
