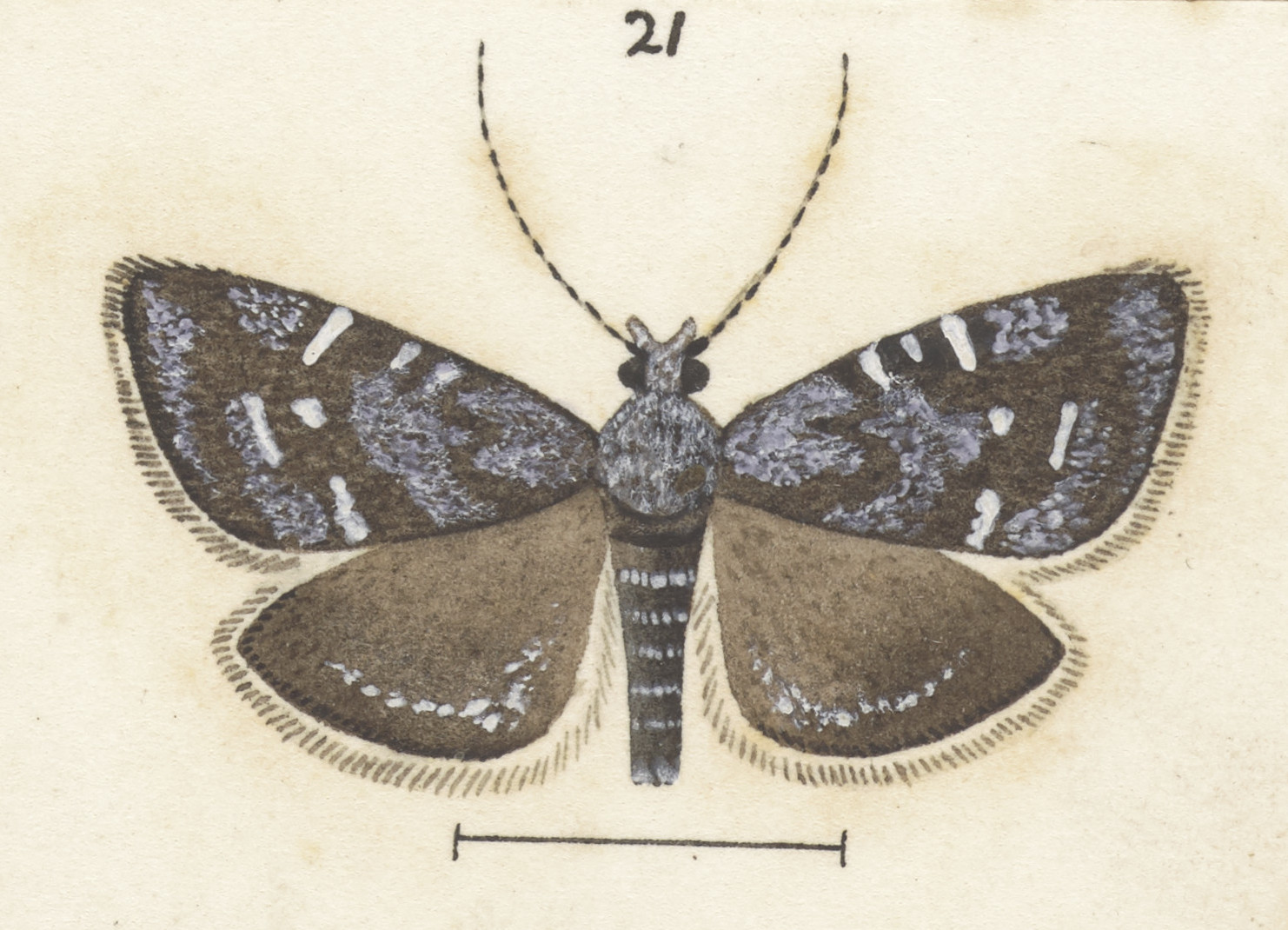
- Illustration of male

Scientific classification
- Kingdom: Animalia
- Phylum: Arthropoda
- Class: Insecta
- Order: Lepidoptera
- Family: Choreutidae
- Genus: Asterivora
- Species: A. symbolaea

Binomial name
- Asterivora symbolaea (Meyrick, 1888)

Synonyms
- Simaethis symbolaea Meyrick, 1888

= Asterivora symbolaea =

Species of moth

Asterivora symbolaea is a species of moth in the family Choreutidae. It is endemic to New Zealand and has been observed in Arthur's Pass. This species lives in subalpine habitat. Adults of this is on the wing in January and February. Larvae are hosted by Celmisia prorepens.

== Taxonomy ==
This species was described by Edward Meyrick, using specimens collected at Arthur's Pass at 3000 to 3500 ft in January, and named Simaethis symbolaea. In 1927 Alfred Philpott studied the male genitalia of this species. In 1928 George Hudson discussed and illustrated this species under that name in his book The butterflies and moths of New Zealand. In 1979 J. S. Dugdale placed this species within the genus Asterivora. In 1988 Dugdale confirmed this placement. The male lectotype specimen, collected at Arthur's Pass, is held at the Natural History Museum, London.

== Description ==
This species was described by Meyrick as follows:

Male, female. — 10-13 mm. Head, thorax, and legs dark fuscous irrorated with white. Palpi dark fuscous, with about eight fine white transverse bars, towards base suffused with white. Antennae black, annulated with white. Abdomen dark fuscous, segmental margins sharply silvery- white. Forewings rather elongate, posteriorly moderately dilated, costa gently arched, apex obtuse, hindmargin somewhat oblique, nearly straight, rounded beneath; dark bronzy-fuscous; markings formed by a fine white irroration; a small basal patch, its outer-edge angulated; two angulated transverse lines near together about 1/3; a fine irregularly-indented transverse line beyond middle, space between this and preceding line often partially blackish-fuscous; a cloudy line from 3/4 of costa to anal angle, sometimes interrupted above middle; a white irroration towards upper half of hindmargin : cilia white, with thick black basal and dark fuscous median lines, at apex and anal angle and on a small median spot more or less wholly suffused with dark fuscous. Hindwings dark fuscous, lighter on basal half; a slightly outwards-curved fine white line from anal angle to disc at 2/3, upper portion sometimes followed by a second less-defined similar line; cilia white, with blackish fuscous basal and fuscous median lines.

== Distribution ==
This species is endemic to New Zealand and has been observed in Arthur's Pass.

== Habitat ==
This species lives in subalpine habitat.

== Behaviour ==
Adults of this species is on the wing in January and February.

== Host species ==
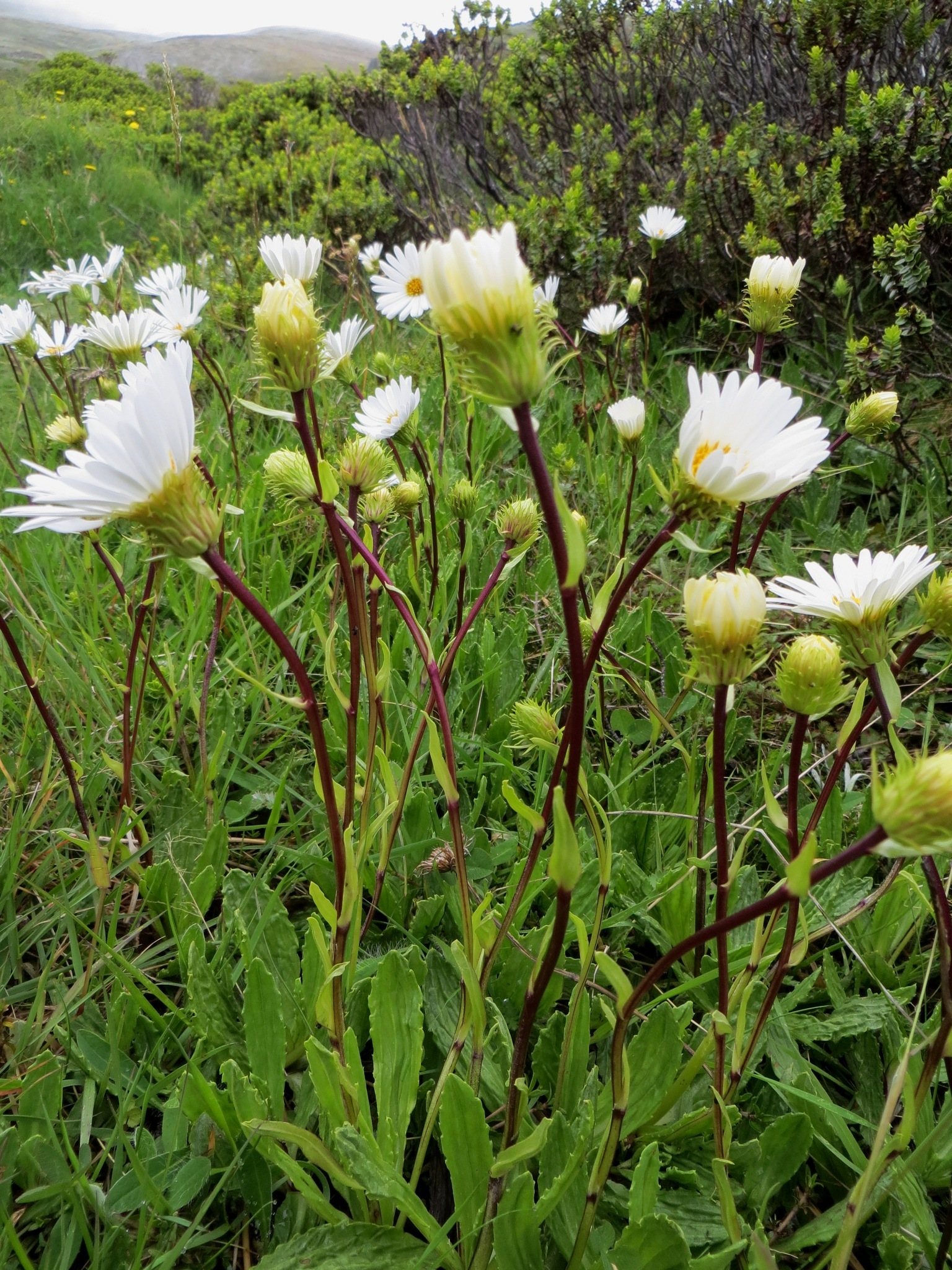
Celmisia prorepens, larval host species

A host for the larvae of this moth is Celmisia prorepens. Moths have been raised from larvae obtained on this plant.
