= Asterivora homotypa =

Scientific classification
- Kingdom: Animalia
- Phylum: Arthropoda
- Class: Insecta
- Order: Lepidoptera
- Family: Choreutidae
- Genus: Asterivora
- Species: A. homotypa

Binomial name
- Asterivora homotypa (Meyrick, 1907)

Synonyms
- Choreutis homotypa Meyrick, 1907

Species of moth

Asterivora homotypa is a species of moth of the family Choreutidae. It is found in subalpine and alpine habitats in Australia. Adult moths have brown forewings, each with various white markings including two vague transverse white speckled bars. Their hindwings are brown, each with a vague white wiggly submarginal line. Their wingspan length is approximately 1 centimetre.
