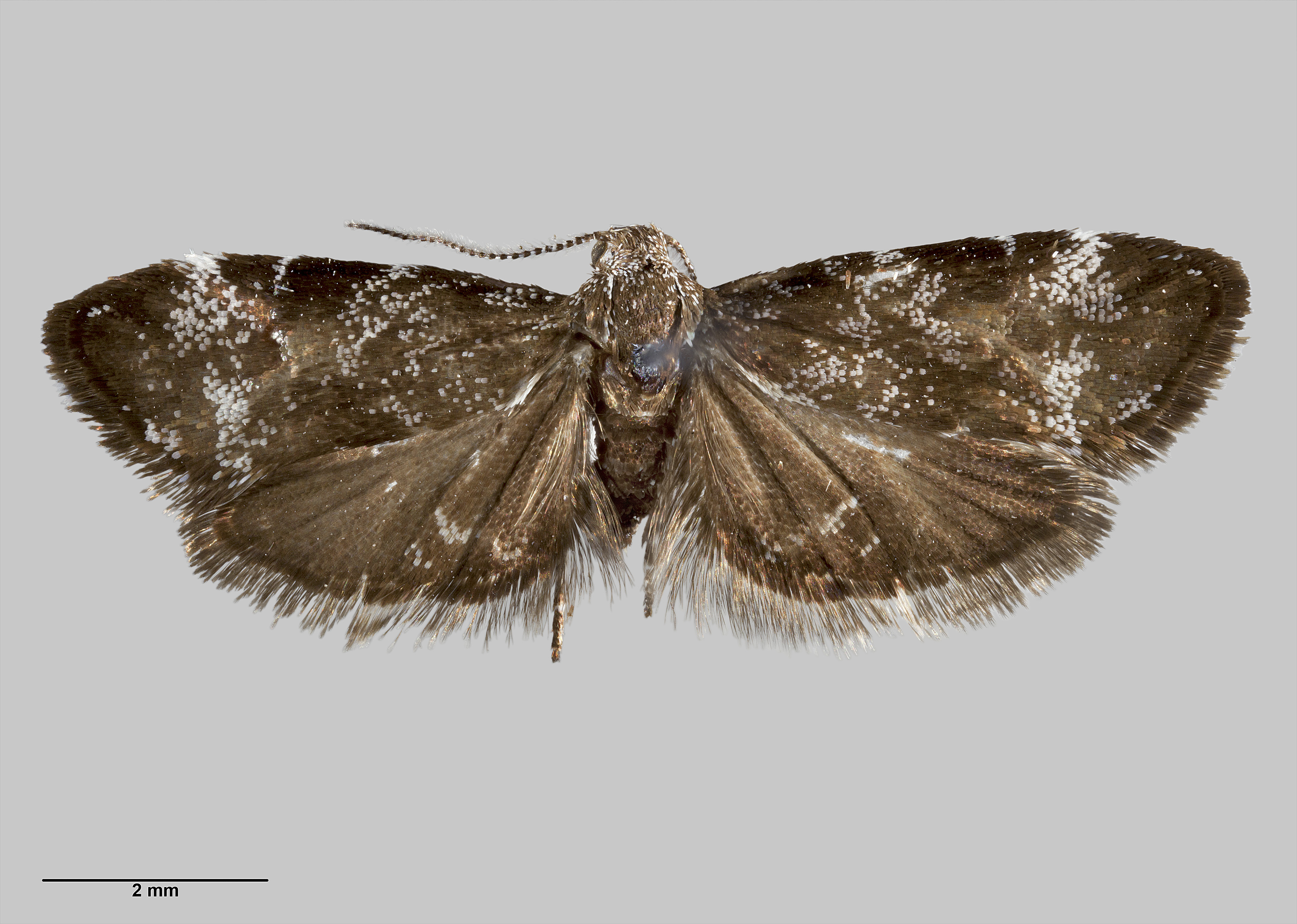

Scientific classification
- Kingdom: Animalia
- Phylum: Arthropoda
- Class: Insecta
- Order: Lepidoptera
- Family: Choreutidae
- Genus: Asterivora
- Species: A. tristis

Binomial name
- Asterivora tristis (Philpott, 1930)

Synonyms
- Simaethis tristis Philpott, 1930

= Asterivora tristis =

Species of moth

Asterivora tristis is a species of moth in the family Choreutidae. It is endemic to New Zealand and has been observed in Tongariro National Park. Adults of this species are on the wing in January.

== Taxonomy ==
This species was first described by Alfred Philpott in 1930, using specimens collected on the slopes of Mount Ruapehu at Tongariro National Park in January, and named Simaethis inspoliata. In 1939 George Hudson discussed and illustrated this species under that name. In 1979 J. S. Dugdale placed this species within the genus Asterivora. In 1988 Dugdale confirmed this placement. The male holotype specimen is held at the Auckland War Memorial Museum.

== Description ==
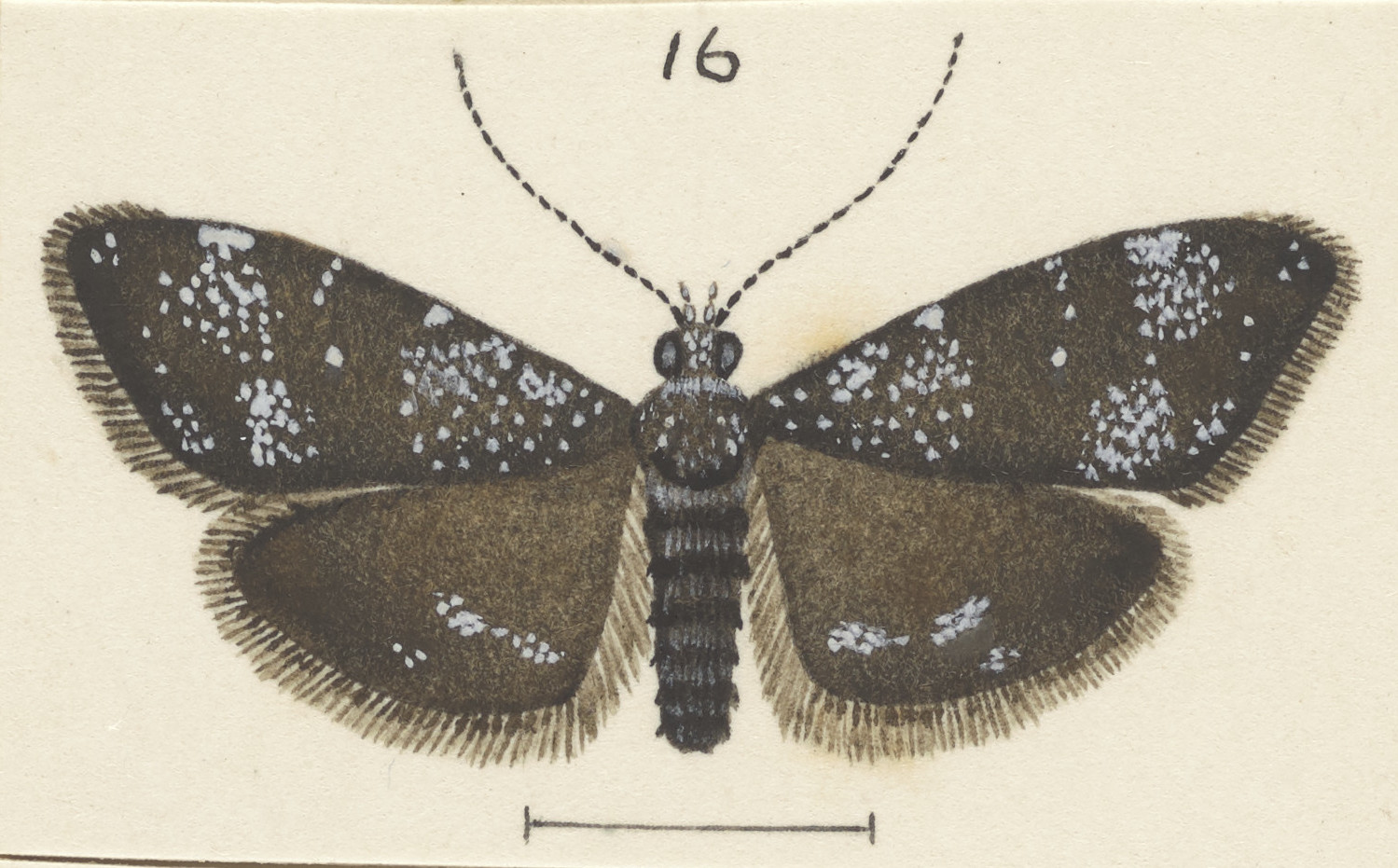
Illustration of A. tristis by George Hudson.

Philpott described this species as follows:

♂. 10-11 mm. Head and thorax dark brown sprinkled with white. Palpi white annulated with black. Antennae black annulated with white, ciliations in ♂ 2. Abdomen dark brown, segmental divisions whitish. Legs dark brown mixed with white. Forewings with costa moderately arched, apex rounded, termen hardly rounded, oblique; deep blackish fuscous densely sprinkled with bluish white scales which tend to form fasciae at base, 1/3 and 3/4 ; a short streak of whitish scales along termen above tornus; usually a rather conspicuous white spot on costa at 3/4; fringes dark drown, tipped with white at tornus and beneath apex. Hindwings dark purplish fuscous; a very obscure whitish fascia from tornus to about middle of wing, sometimes absent: fringes brown, more or less mixed with white and with a broad purplish fuscous basal band.

This species is similar to A. albifasciata but lacks the distinguishing whitish sub-terminal shade of the later species.

== Distribution ==
This species is endemic to New Zealand and has been observed in Tongariro National Park.

== Behaviour ==
The adults of this species are on the wing in January.
