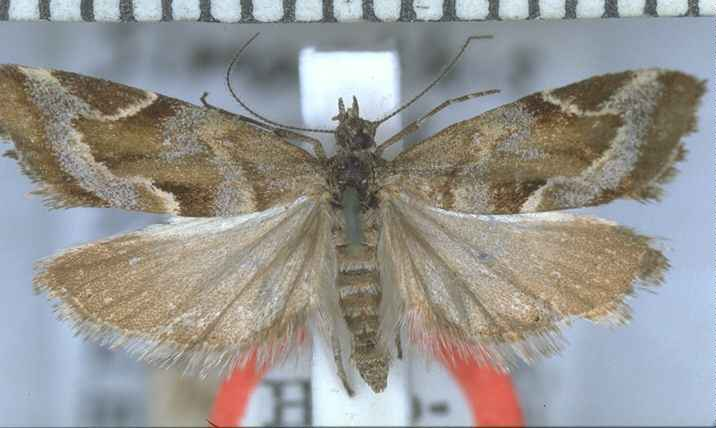
- Male holotype

Scientific classification
- Kingdom: Animalia
- Phylum: Arthropoda
- Class: Insecta
- Order: Lepidoptera
- Family: Choreutidae
- Genus: Asterivora
- Species: A. exocha

Binomial name
- Asterivora exocha (Meyrick, 1907)

Synonyms
- Simaethis exocha Meyrick, 1907

= Asterivora exocha =

Species of moth

Asterivora exocha is a species of moth in the family Choreutidae. It was first described by Edward Meyrick in 1907 and is endemic to New Zealand. This species has only been observed in the Humboldt Ranges of Otago and inhabits subalpine native bush at elevations of around 3600 ft. Adults of this species are on the wing in December and January and have been observed flying at dusk.

== Taxonomy ==
This species was first described by Edward Meyrick in 1907, using a specimen collected by George Hudson at the Humboldt Range, Lake Wakatipu at 3,600 ft, and named Simaethis exocha. In 1928 George Hudson discussed and illustrated this species under that name in his book The butterflies and moths of New Zealand. In 1979 J. S. Dugdale placed this species within the genus Asterivora. In 1988 Dugdale confirmed this placement. The male holotype specimen, collected in the Humboldt Mountains, is held at the Natural History Museum, London.

== Description ==
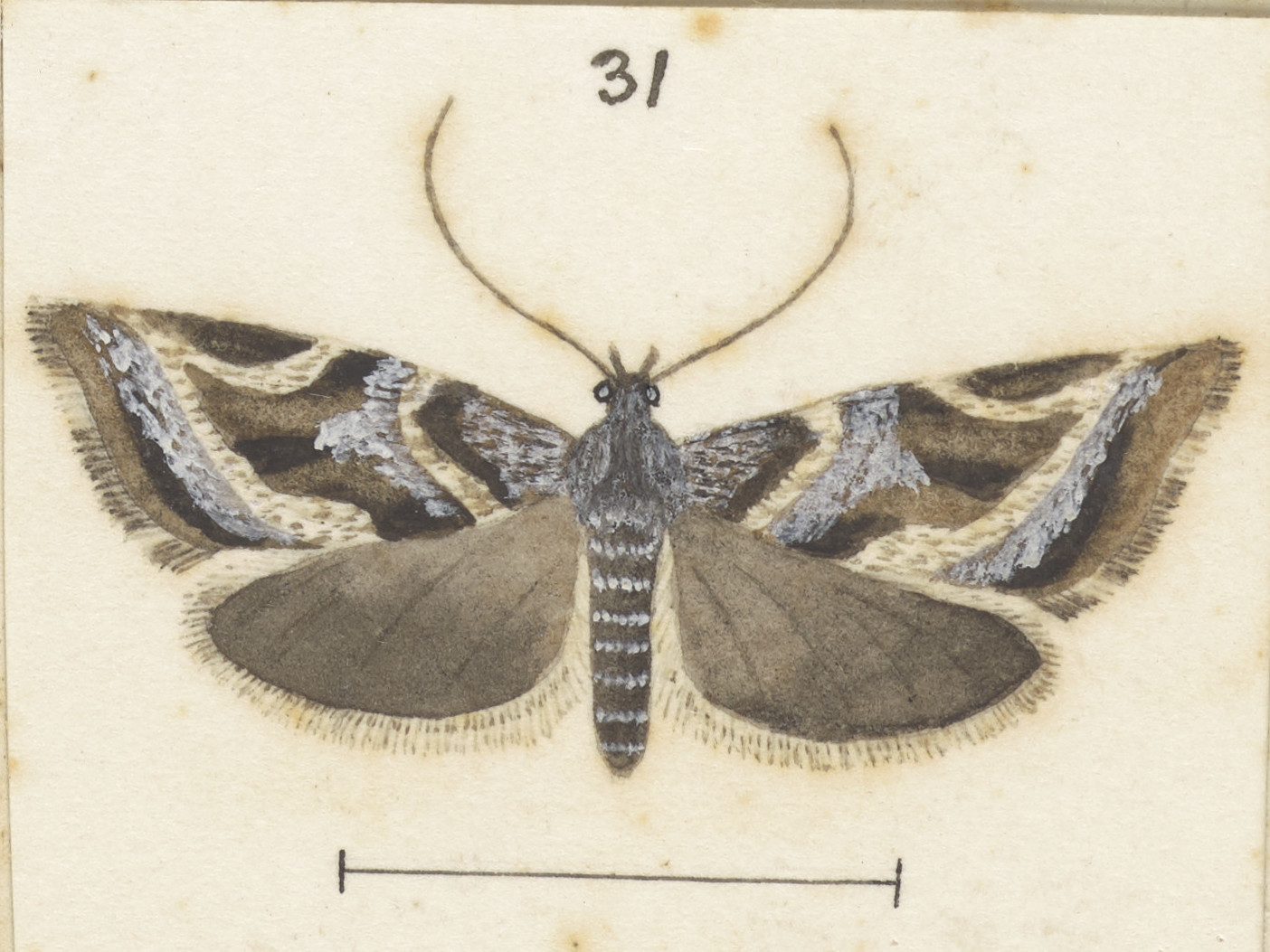
Illustration of A. exocha by George Hudson.

Meyrick described this species as follows:

♂. 20 mm. Head, palpi, and thorax grey-whitish mixed with blackish. Antennae pale grey, ringed with blackish. Abdomen fuscous, segmental margins mixed with whitish. Fore-wings elongate, moderate, posteriorly rather dilated, costa gently arched, apex obtuse, termen faintly sinuate, oblique; 7 and 8 connate; olive-fuscous, costa and dorsum broadly suffused with dark fuscous; basal area irrorated with whitish except a narrow fascia preceding first line; first line whitish, acutely angulated near costa, followed by a very irregular fascia of whitish irroration, which sends a triangular projection above middle to centre of disc; second line white, sharply defined, running from middle of costa to 3/4 of disc, thence acutely angulated to beyond middle of dorsum, somewhat sinuate inwards towards costa and dorsum; an evenly broad fascia of white irroration from 4/5 of costa to 4/5 of dorsum, resting on second line in discal portion, terminating in a white spot on costa, and edged with a white line from this to angle of second line: cilia grey mixed with whitish, and indistinctly barred with dark fuscous irroration. Hindwings grey, darker posteriorly; indications of a cloudy whitish dot towards termen below middle; cilia grey mixed with whitish, with dark grey basal line.

== Distribution ==
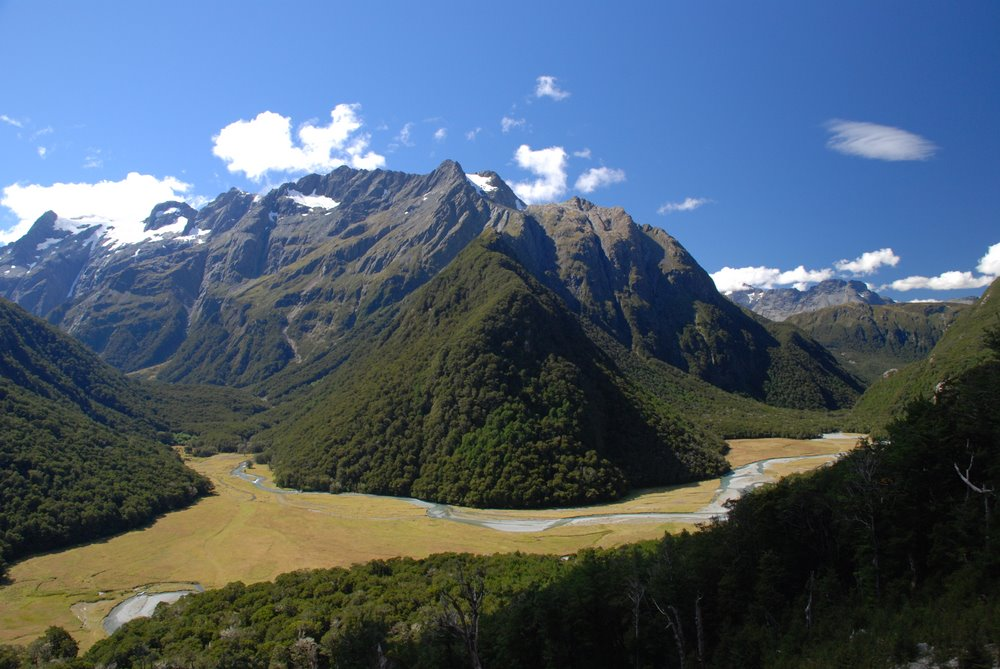
Humboldt Mountains, type locality of A. exocha.

This species is endemic to New Zealand and has been observed in the Humboldt Range near Lake Wakatipu.

== Habitat ==
This species inhabits subalpine bush containing Hebe species at elevations of approximately 3600 ft.

== Host ==
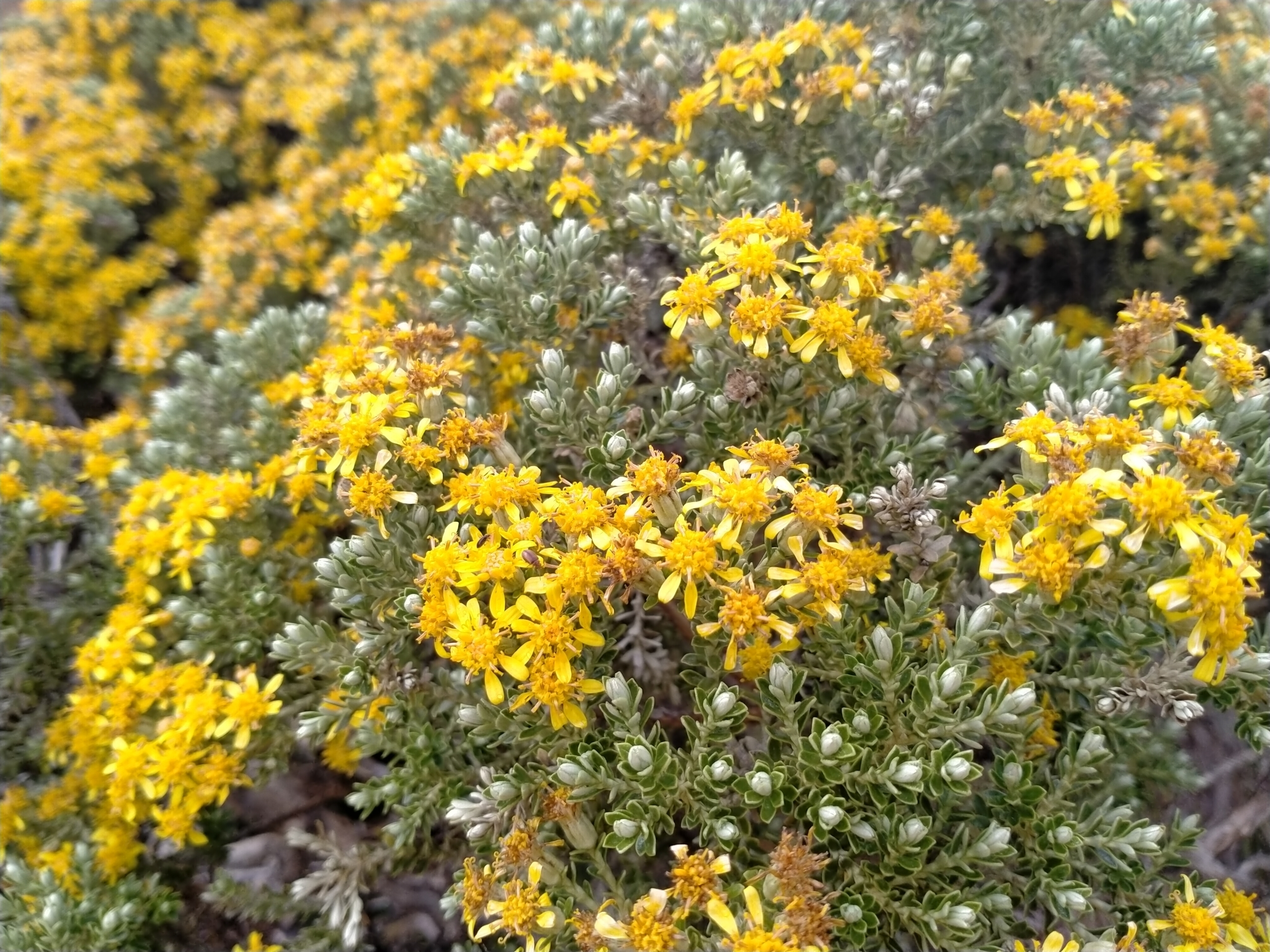
Larval host species Brachyglottis cassinioides

The larval host of this species is Brachyglottis cassinioides.

== Behaviour ==
Adults of this species are on the wing in December and January. They have been observed to fly at dusk.
