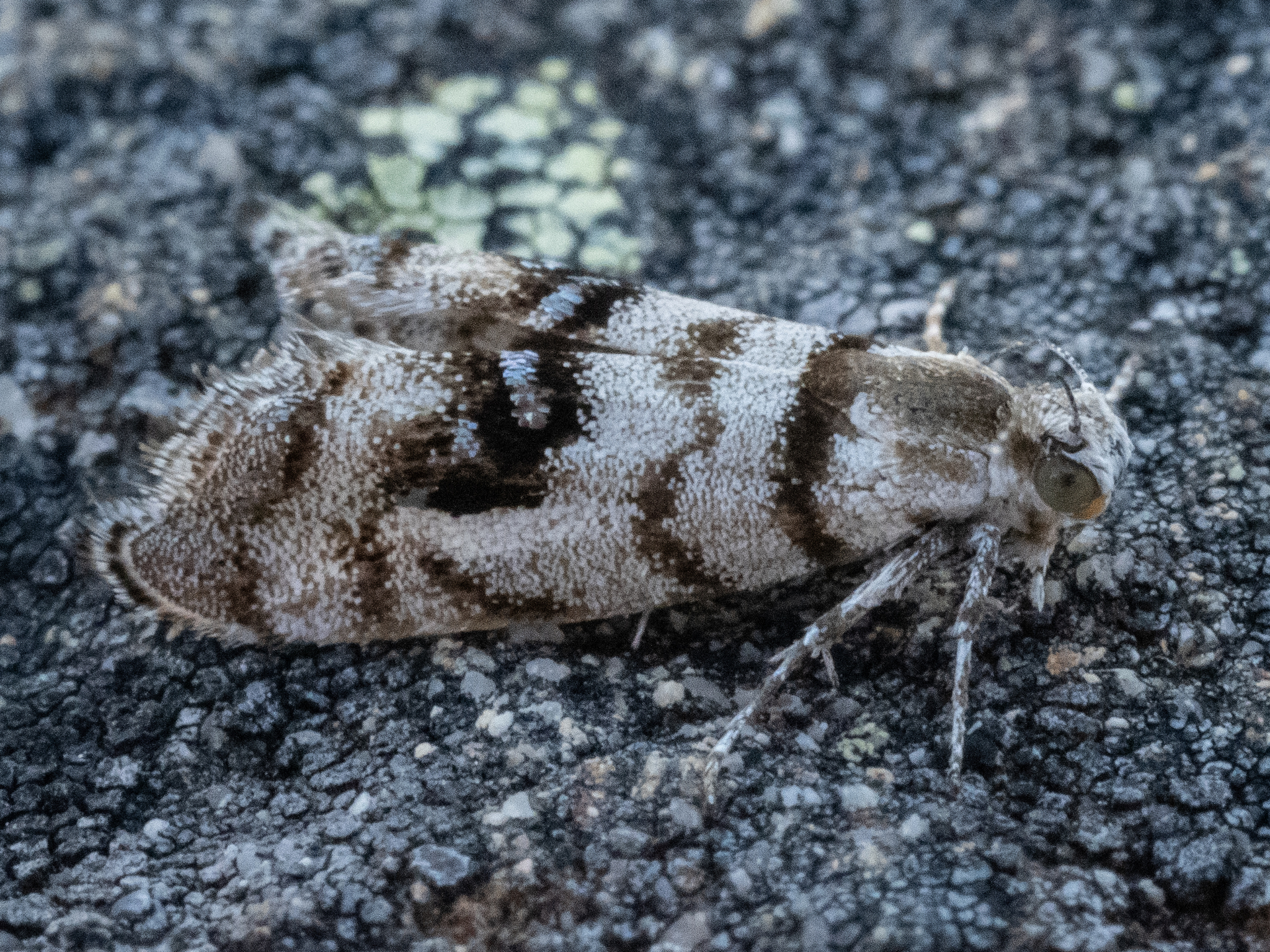
- Living animal seen near Lake Ōhau

Scientific classification
- Kingdom: Animalia
- Phylum: Arthropoda
- Class: Insecta
- Order: Lepidoptera
- Family: Choreutidae
- Genus: Asterivora
- Species: A. inspoliata

Binomial name
- Asterivora inspoliata (Philpott, 1930)

Synonyms
- Simaethis inspoliata Philpott, 1930

= Asterivora inspoliata =

Species of moth

Asterivora inspoliata is a species of moth in the family Choreutidae. It is endemic to New Zealand, and has been found in the subalpine hills and mountains of Otago, Fiordland and Southland in the South Island. Adults are on the wing in December and January.

== Description ==
Philpott described this species as follows:

♂. 10 mm (0.39 in). Head and thorax dark brown. Pace grey. Palpi, second segment with dense rounded descending tuft, grey. Antennae black spotted with white, ciliations in ♂ 3 1/4. Abdomen greyish fuscous. Legs dark fuscous, mixed and banded with white. Porewings with costa slightly arched, apex rounded, termen almost straight, oblique; brown; markings formed chiefly by dense white irroration; a small irregular basal patch; a broad band from 1/5 to 1/2 costa and 1/4 to 1/2 dorsum, its inner edge slightly incurved and its outer margin irregular; a broad fascia from costa at 3/4 to tornus, constricted beneath costa and somewhat excurved; a thin subterminal line white on costa and metallic blue round termen: between second and third fasciae on lower half of wing a large black blotch enclosing two small patches of metallic blue scales: fringes brown, touched with white at tornus and with a darker basal line. Hindwings pale purplish brown, lighter towards apex; a rather obscure white fascia from tornus reaching about half way round termen and keeping close to the margin: fringes brown, more or less white-tipped and with a darker basal line.

Philpott noted similarities between the species and Asterivora urbana, and that the two species could be differentiated due to their different markings and antennae structure.

== Taxonomy ==
This species was first described by Alfred Philpott in 1930, using a specimen collected by Charles Edwin Clarke at Flat Mountain in the Hunter Mountains in December at 4,000 feet (1,200 m), and named Simaethis inspoliata. In 1939 George Hudson discussed and illustrated this species under that name. In 1979 J. S. Dugdale placed this species within the genus Asterivora. In 1988 Dugdale confirmed this placement. The male holotype specimen, collected at Flat Mountain, is held at the Auckland War Memorial Museum.

== Distribution ==
This species is endemic to New Zealand, and has been found in subalpine habitat in the hills and mountains of Otago, Fiordland and Southland.

== Behaviour ==
Adults of this species are on the wing in December and January.

== Gallery ==
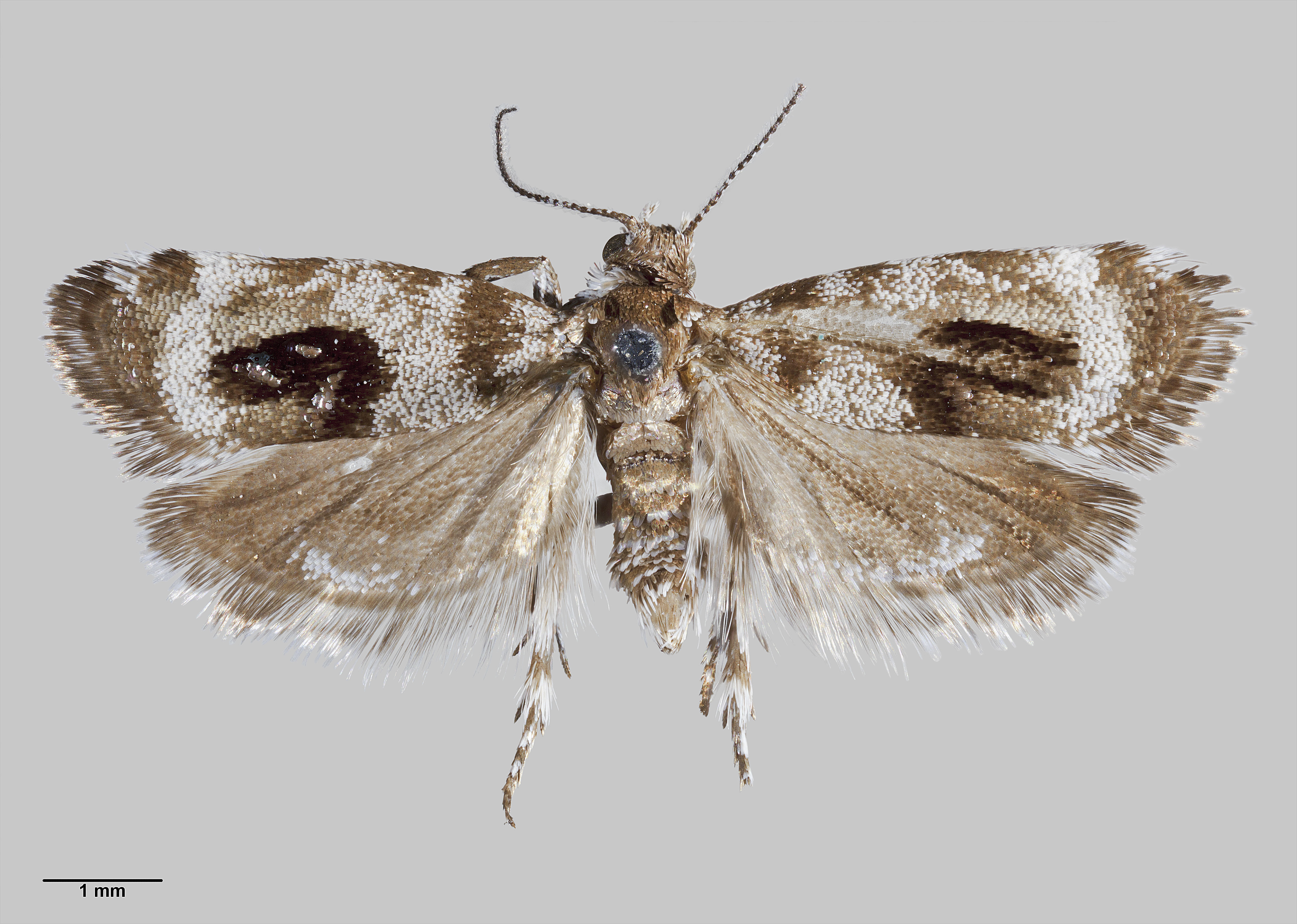
Male holotype specimen held at the Auckland War Memorial Museum.

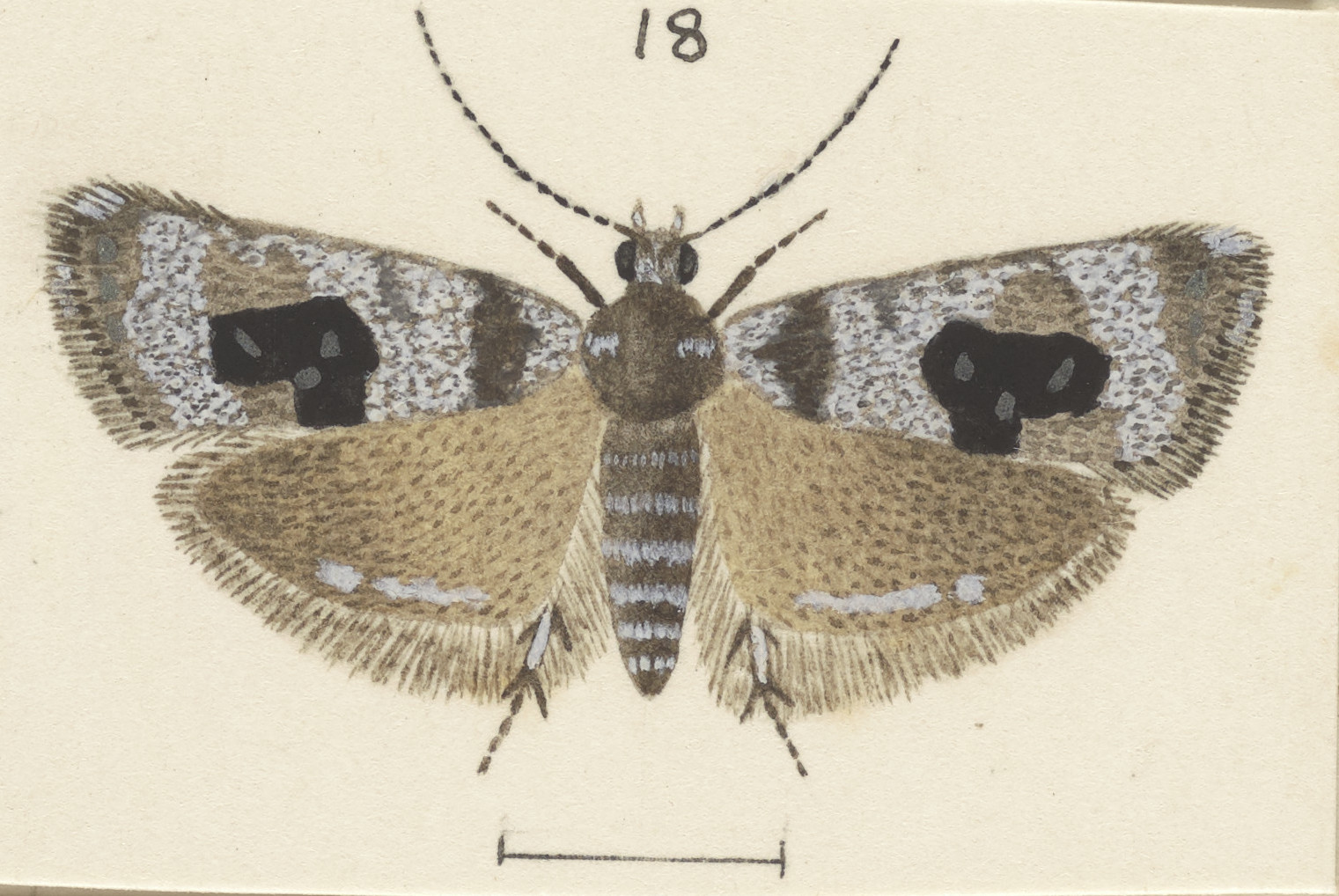
Illustration of A. inspoliata by George Hudson.

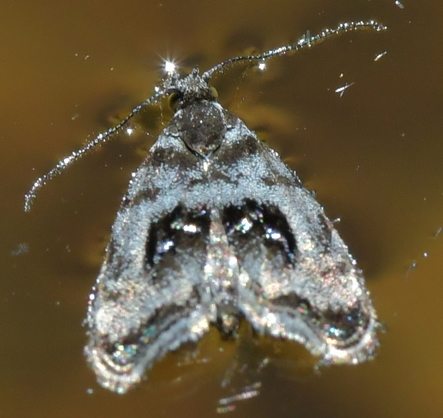
A. inspoliata seen at Conical Hill, Fiordland National Park

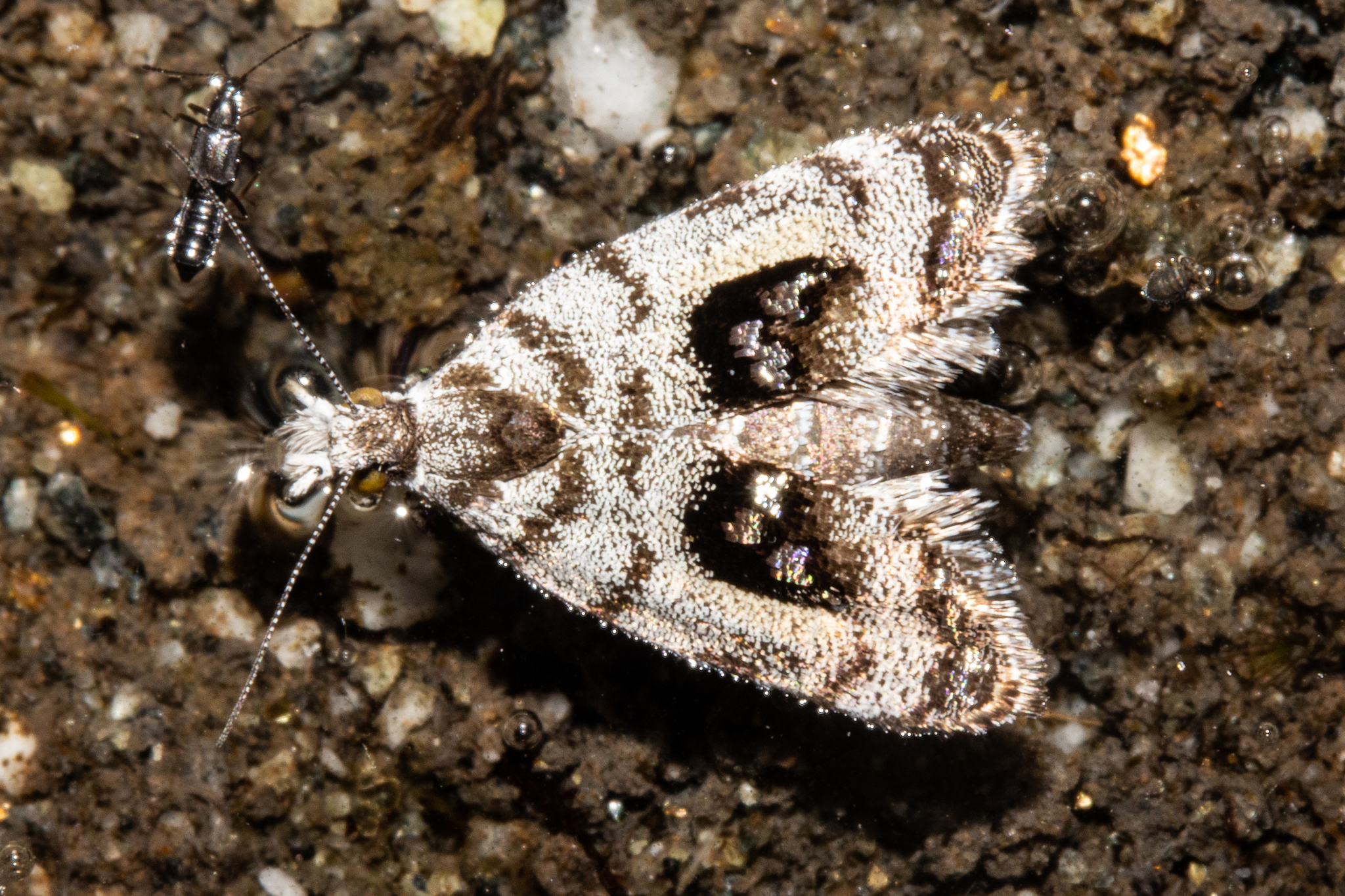
Top-down view of living A. inspoliata
