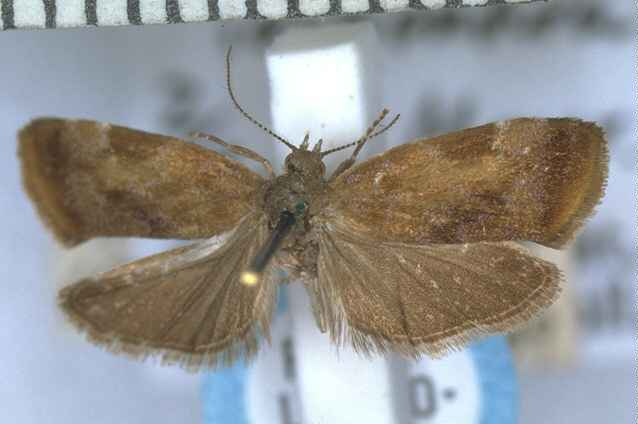
- Male lectotype

Scientific classification
- Kingdom: Animalia
- Phylum: Arthropoda
- Class: Insecta
- Order: Lepidoptera
- Family: Choreutidae
- Genus: Asterivora
- Species: A. iochondra

Binomial name
- Asterivora iochondra (Meyrick, 1911)

Synonyms
- Simaethis iochondra Meyrick, 1911

= Asterivora iochondra =

Species of moth, endemic to New Zealand

Asterivora iochondra is a species of moth in the family Choreutidae. It is endemic to New Zealand and was first described by Edward Meyrick in 1911. This species has been observed in both the North and South Island at Mount Holdsworth and Mount Arthur. This species inhabits open spaces on mountains on the forest edge at 3000 ft altitude. Adults of this species are on the wing in February and flies rapidly in sunshine.

== Taxonomy ==
This species was first described by Edward Meyrick in 1911, collected by George Hudson at Mount Holdsworth, Tararua Range at 3000 ft in February, and named Simaethis iochondra. George Hudson discussed and illustrated this species in his 1928 publication The butterflies and moths of New Zealand. In 1979 J. S. Dugdale placed this species within the genus Asterivora. In 1988 Dugdale confirmed this placement. The male lectotype specimen is held at the Natural History Museum, London.

== Description ==
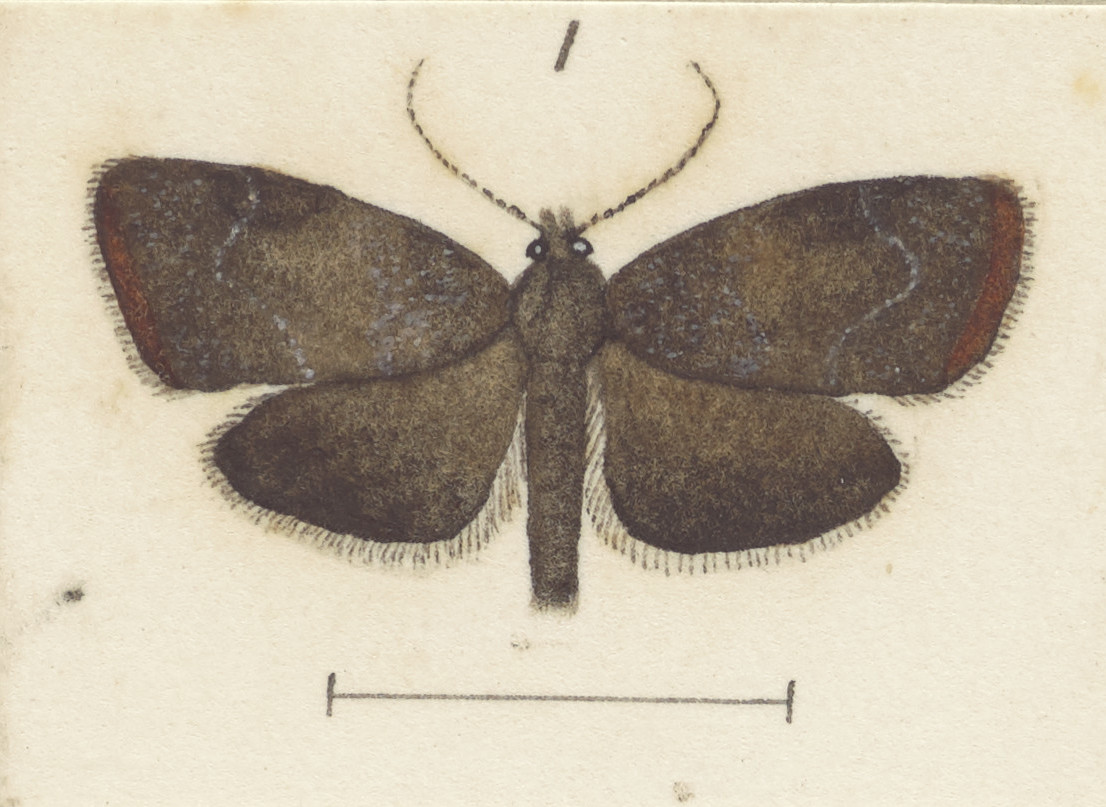
Illustration of male A. iochondra by George Hudson.

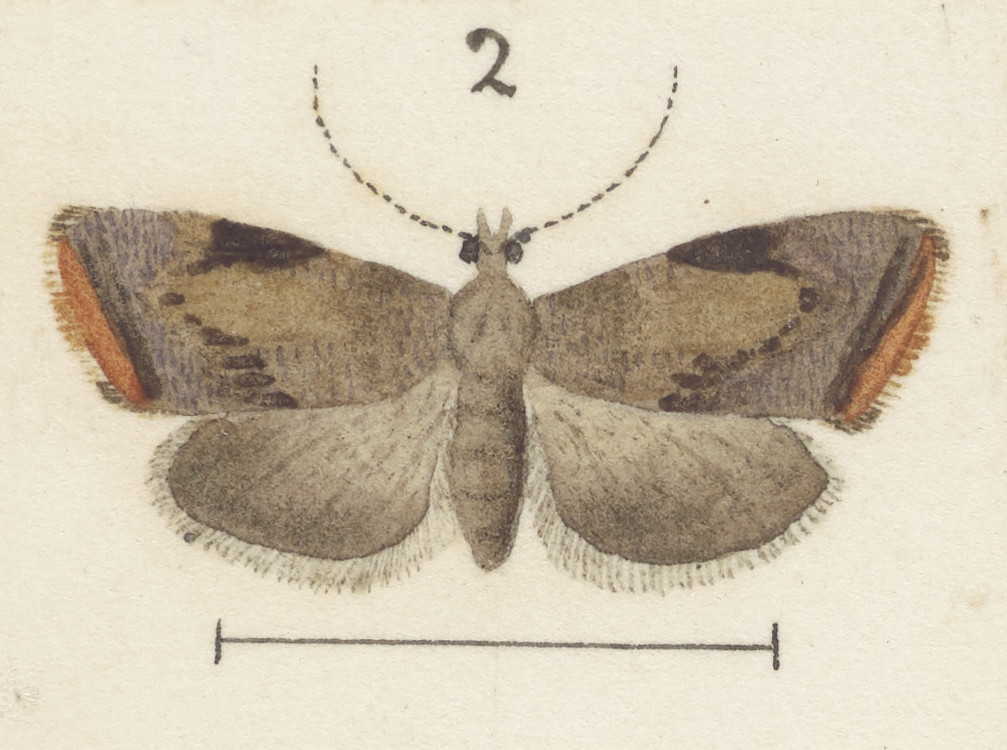
Illustration of female A. iochondra by George Hudson.

Meyrick described this species as follows:

♂. 16–17 mm. Head and thorax dark brown, with a few whitish specks. Palpi clothed with whorls of dark-fuscous whitish-tipped scales. Antennae dark fuscous dotted with white. Abdomen dark fuscous. Forewings suboblong, moderate, costa moderately arched, apex obtuse, termen rounded, oblique; dark bronzy-brown; basal area sprinkled with violet-whitish specks; a very undefined irregularly dentate shade of violet-whitish specks from 2/5 of costa to middle of dorsum; an irregular fascia of violet-whitish specks at 3/4, constricted above middle, dilated on dorsum so as to coalesce with preceding shade; a light brownish-ochreous patch in disc between these; a terminal streak of ochreous-brown suffusion: cilia ochreous-brownish, mixed with darker at apex and tornus, tips whitish. Hindwings ovatetriangular, termen slightly rounded, hardly perceptibly sinuate; dark fuscous; cilia grey, with dark-fuscous subbasal shade, tips whitish.

== Distribution ==
This species is endemic to New Zealand. This species has been observed at the type locality of Mount Holdsworth as well as at Mount Arthur.

== Habitat ==
This species inhabits open spaces on mountains on the forest edge at around 3000 ft in altitude.

== Behaviour ==
The adults of this species are on the wing in February. Hudson stated that this species flies rapidly in sunshine.
