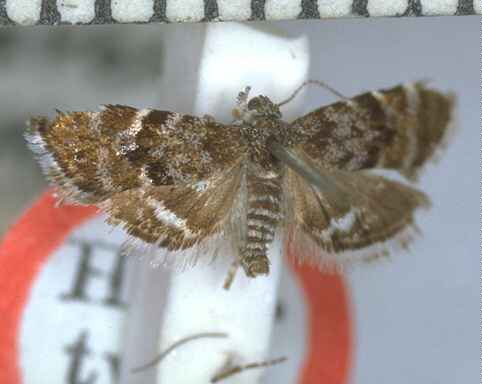
- Male holotype

Scientific classification
- Kingdom: Animalia
- Phylum: Arthropoda
- Class: Insecta
- Order: Lepidoptera
- Family: Choreutidae
- Genus: Asterivora
- Species: A. marmarea

Binomial name
- Asterivora marmarea (Meyrick, 1888)

Synonyms
- Simaethis marmarea Meyrick, 1888

= Asterivora marmarea =

Species of moth endemic to New Zealand

Asterivora marmarea is a species of moth in the family Choreutidae. It is endemic to New Zealand and lives in mountainous habitats. It has been observed in the lower parts of the North Island and the upper South Island. The larval host of this species is Celmisia gracilenta and adults of this species are on the wing in December and January.

== Taxonomy ==
This species was described by Edward Meyrick, collected at Lake Wakatipu at 2200 ft in December, and named Simaethis marmarea. In 1928 George Hudson discussed this species under that name in his book The butterflies and moths of New Zealand. In 1979 J. S. Dugdale placed this species within the genus Asterivora. In 1988 Dugdale confirmed this placement. The male holotype specimen, collected at Lake Wakatipu, is held at the Natural History Museum, London.

== Description ==
Meyrick described this species as follows:

Male.—10 mm. Head, thorax, and legs dark fuscous, densely irrorated with white. Palpi dark fuscous, with about eight fine white transverse bars, towards base suffused with white. Antennæ black, annulated with white. Abdomen dark fuscous, segmental margins sharply silvery-white. Forewings rather elongate, posteriorly somewhat dilated, costa gently arched, apex obtuse, hindmargin obliquely rounded; dark bronzy-fuscous; markings formed by a fine close white irroration; a small ill-defined basal patch; two cloudy dentate angulated almost confluent transverse lines about ⅓; an irregularly angulated transverse line beyond middle, its discal portion silvery-metallic and forming a small spot above middle, separated from preceding line by a black fascia; a straight line from ¾ of costa to anal angle; a silvery-metallic submarginal streak along upper half of hindmargin: cilia whitish, with thick black basal and grey median lines. Hindwings ovate, slightly elongate, rounded; rather dark fuscous; a small cloudy white discal spot at ⅓; a strong straight white line from anal angle to disc beyond middle; above and beyond apex of this a few white scales; cilia as in forewings.

This species is very similar in appearance to A. microlitha but can be distinguished as A. marmarea has more pointed hindwings and a white long, thin line reaching to the tornus.

== Distribution ==
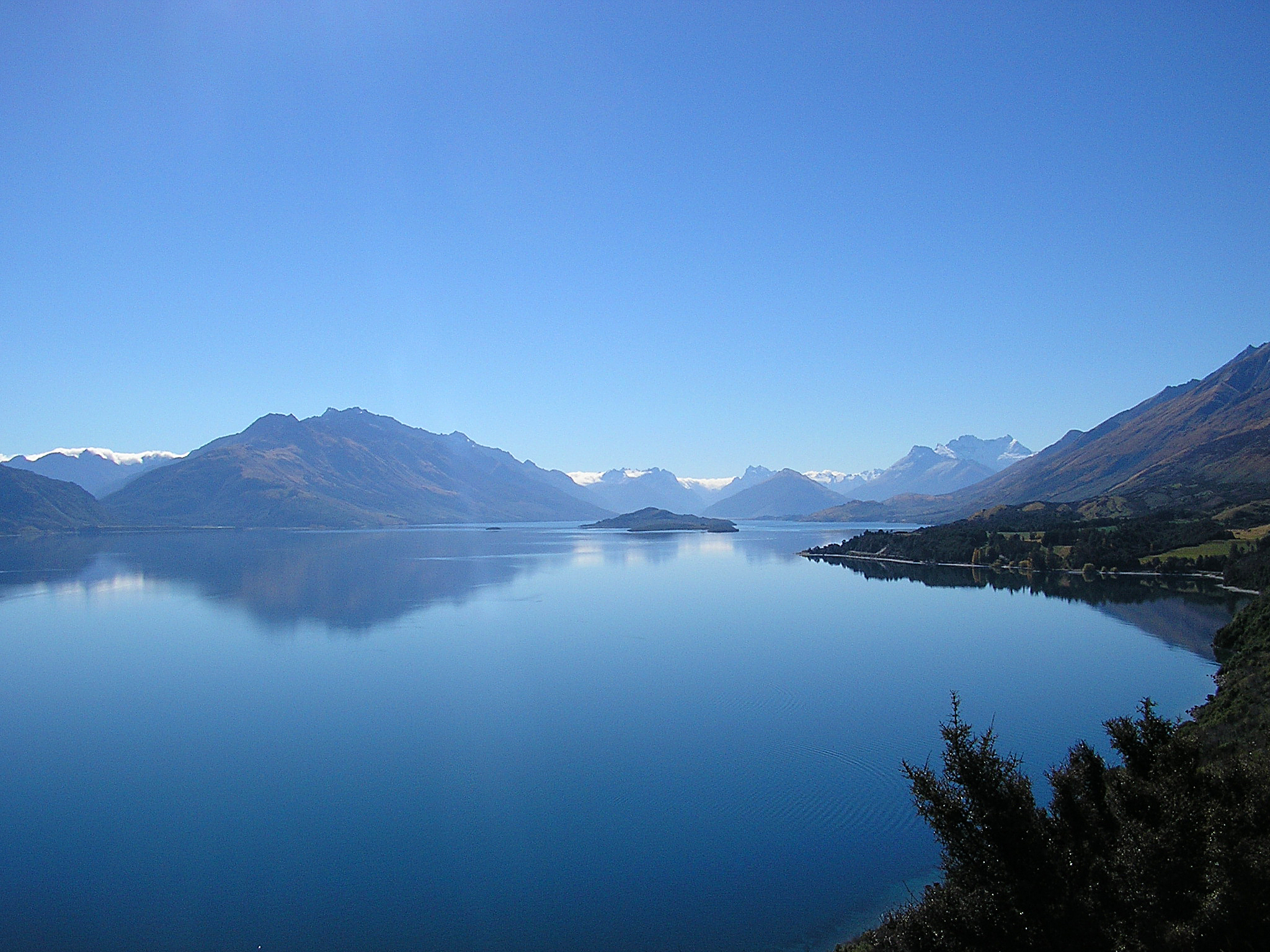
Lake Wakatipu, type locality of A. marmarea.

This species is endemic to New Zealand. Along with the type locality of Lake Wakatipu this species has been collected in the Tasman region as well as at Coronet Peak and the Church Hill Wetland.

== Behaviour ==
Adults of this species are on the wing in December to February.

== Habitat and hosts ==
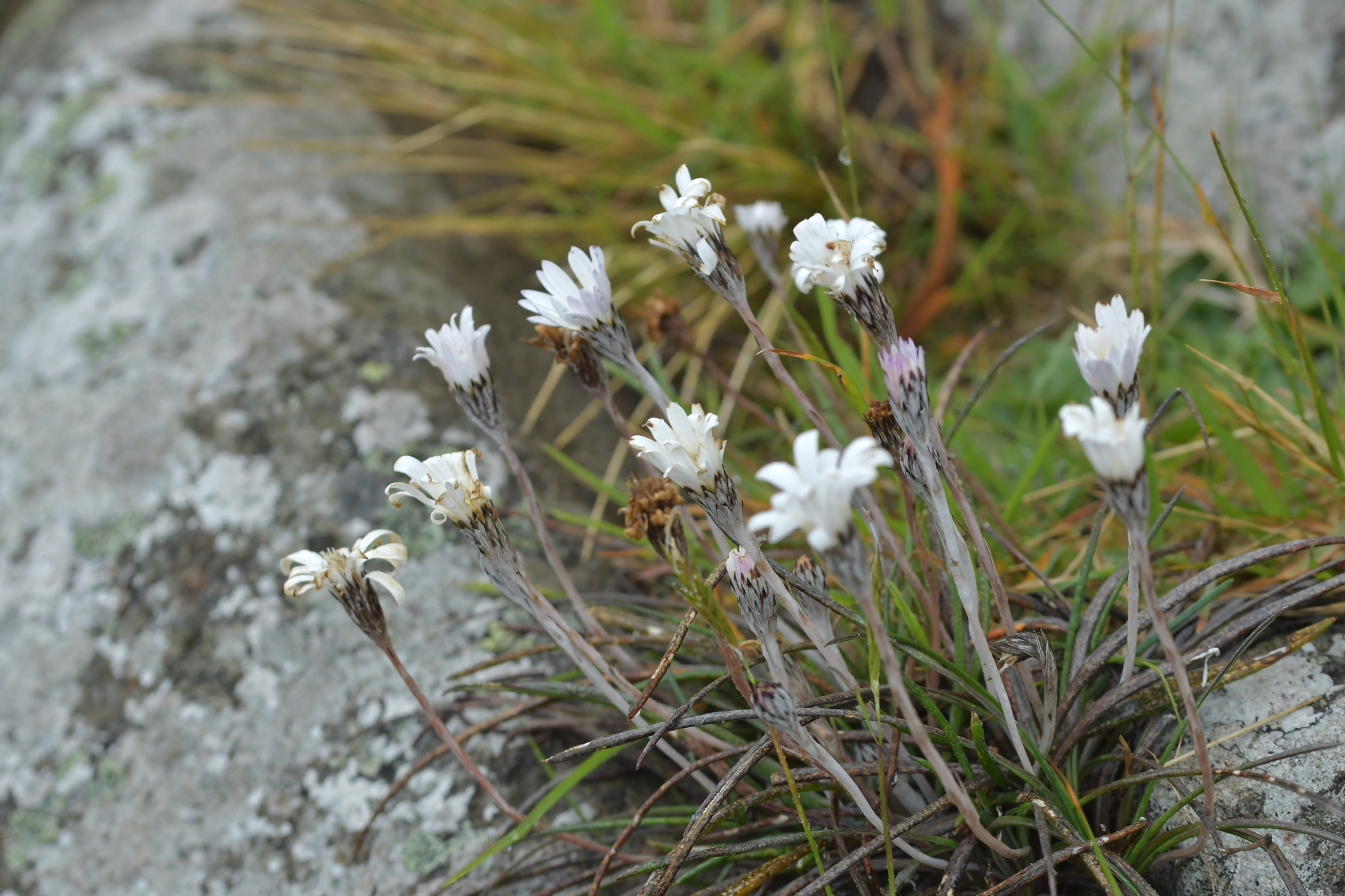
Celmisia gracilenta, larval host plant for A. marmarea

This species inhabits mountain terrain. The larvae have been both observed feeding on, as well as raised in captivity on, Celmisia gracilenta.
