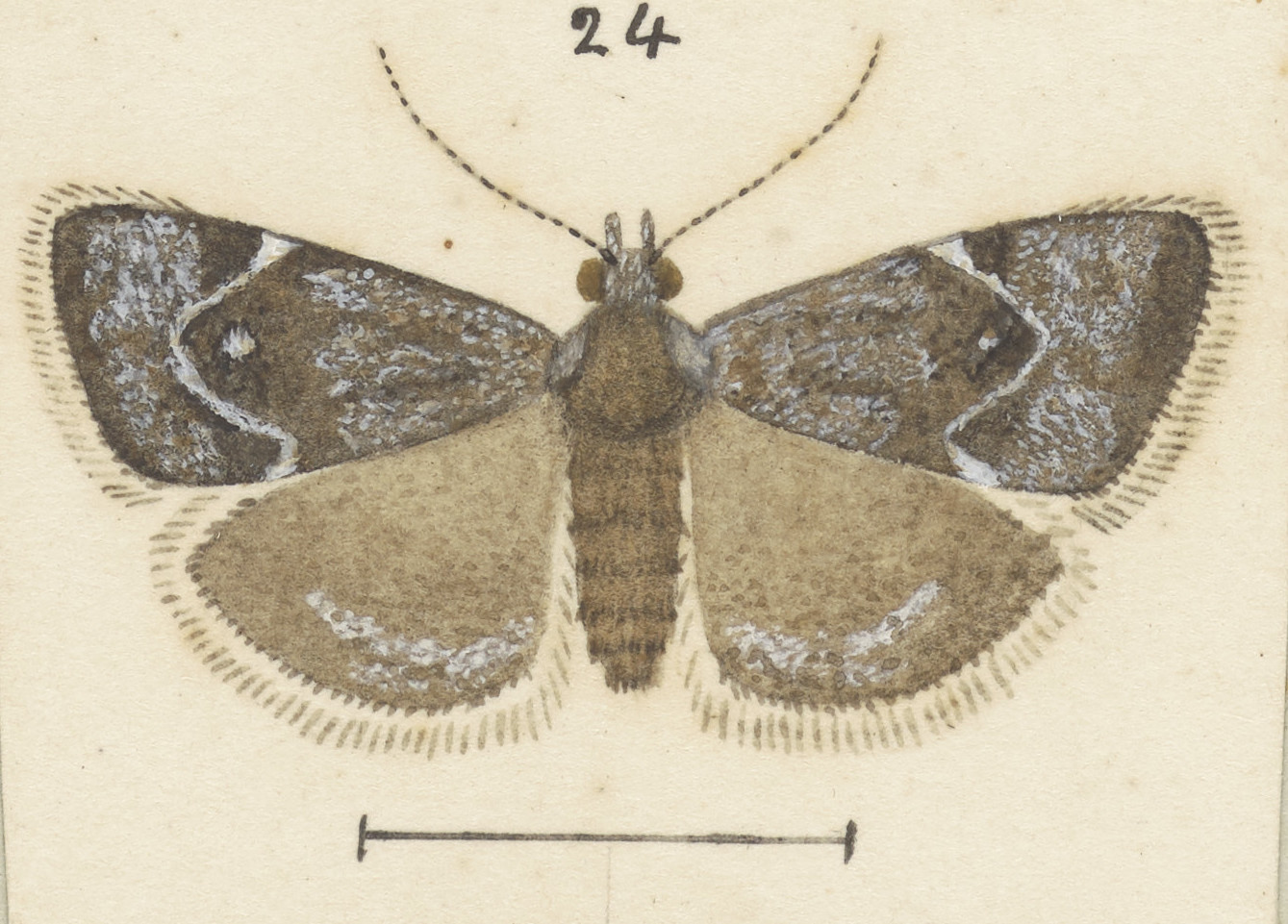
- Illustration of female

Scientific classification
- Kingdom: Animalia
- Phylum: Arthropoda
- Class: Insecta
- Order: Lepidoptera
- Family: Choreutidae
- Genus: Asterivora
- Species: A. nivescens

Binomial name
- Asterivora nivescens (Philpott, 1926)

Synonyms
- Simaethis nivescens Philpott, 1926

= Asterivora nivescens =

Species of moth

Asterivora nivescens is a species of moth in the family Choreutidae. It is endemic to New Zealand and has been observed in Nelson. This species inhabits native herbage on mountain sides. Adults of this species are on the wing in January.

== Taxonomy ==
This species was first described by Alfred Philpott in 1926, using specimens collected at Gordon's Pyramid, Mount Arthur, and named Simaethis nivescens. George Hudson discussed and illustrated this species in his 1928 publication The butterflies and moths of New Zealand. In 1979 J. S. Dugdale placed this species within the genus Asterivora. In 1988 Dugdale confirmed this placement. The male holotype specimen, collected at Mount Arthur, is held at the New Zealand Arthropod Collection.

== Description ==
Philpott described this species as follows:

♂ ♀. 16–17 mm. Head and palpi brown densely sprinkled with white; second segment of palpi with strong but longitudinally-narrow scale-tuft. Antennae blackish annulated with white, ciliations in male 1 1/2. Thorax bronzy-brown, tegulae spotted with white. Abdomen bronzy-brown, segmental divisions white. Legs brown, densely sprinkled with white. Forewings moderate, costa slightly arched, apex rounded, termen slightly rounded, little oblique; bronzy-brown; basal 2/5 sprinkled with white scales which tend to form one or two bands; a white spot on costa at 3/5 giving rise to a white line which follows an outwardly-oblique course to near middle of wing, thence bending sharply inwardly to above dorsum to which it recurves, in male this line is absorbed in subterminal band of white scales; preceding this line is a broad band almost free of white scales except those forming the discal spot; a broad subterminal band of white scales, touching second line at middle: fringes white, with broad blackish basal band and a similar but paler apical band. Hindwings tuscous. a white fascia round tornus, thence dividing into two and extending to middle of termen, in male this fascia is represented by only a few scales: fringes as in forewings.

== Description ==
This species is endemic to New Zealand and has been observed in Nelson.

== Habitat ==
This species inhabits native herbage on mountainsides.

== Behaviour ==
Adults of this species are on the wing in January.
