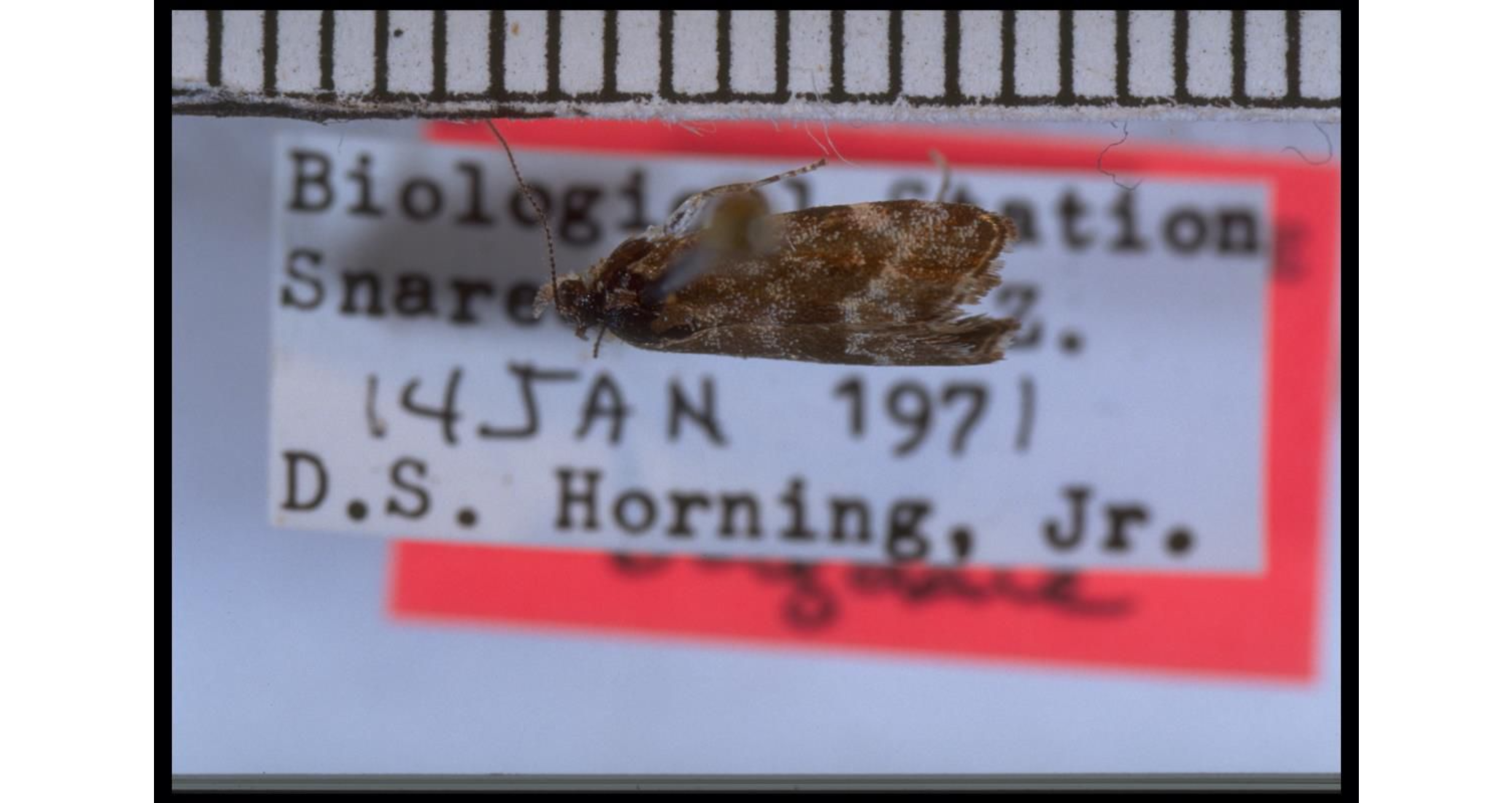
- Male holotype

Scientific classification
- Domain: Eukaryota
- Kingdom: Animalia
- Phylum: Arthropoda
- Class: Insecta
- Order: Lepidoptera
- Family: Choreutidae
- Genus: Asterivora
- Species: A. oleariae

Binomial name
- Asterivora oleariae Dugdale, 1979

= Asterivora oleariae =

Species of moth

Asterivora oleariae is a species of moth in the family Choreutidae. It is endemic to New Zealand and can be found on Stewart Island, Big South Cape Island and The Snares. There is one generation a year on The Snares with adults being on the wing in January and February. Larvae are feed on plants in the Olearia genus.

== Taxonomy ==
This species was first described by J. S. Dugdale in 1979 using specimens collected by Donald S. Horning and named Asterivora oleariae. In 1988 Dugdale confirmed this placement. The male holotype specimen, collected at the Snares Islands, is held at the New Zealand Arthropod Collection.

== Description ==
Dugdale described this species as follows:

Antenna with whorls of long setulae in ♂; frons white-scaled ventrally, darker above; ocelli fringed below by a line of white scales; head, thorax, and abdomen clothed above in grey-brown scaleswhite-tipped on head, uniform elsewhere-intermingled with white scales; venter with uniform buff or white scales. Forewing patterned in dark grey and white ... pale areas larger in ♀; hindwing dark grey, white sub terminal band lacking. Length (vertex to wingtip) 8.5-8.7 mm (The Snares), 7.0 mm (Stewart I.).

The pupa of this species is black in colour.

== Distribution ==
This species is endemic to New Zealand but has been collected in The Snares, Stewart Island and Big South Cape Island.

== Life cycle ==
There is one generation per year on The Snares. Adults are on the wing in January and February. It has been hypothesised that the larval development coincides with the leaf development of its host plants.

== Hosts ==
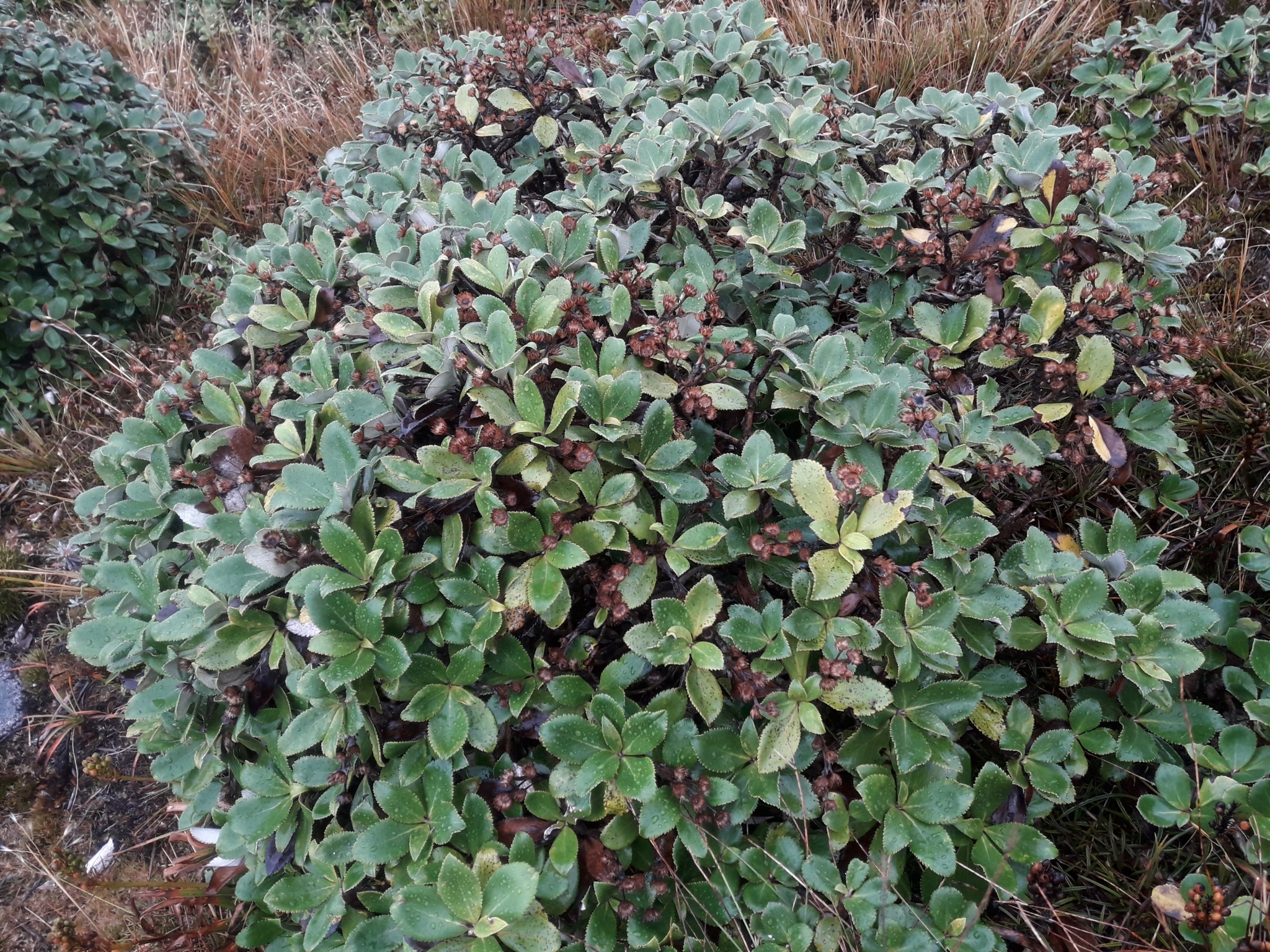
Olearia colensoi, a larval host plant of A. oleariae

The larvae feed on plants in the genus Olearia including Olearia colensoi, Olearia lyalli and Olearia angustifolia.
