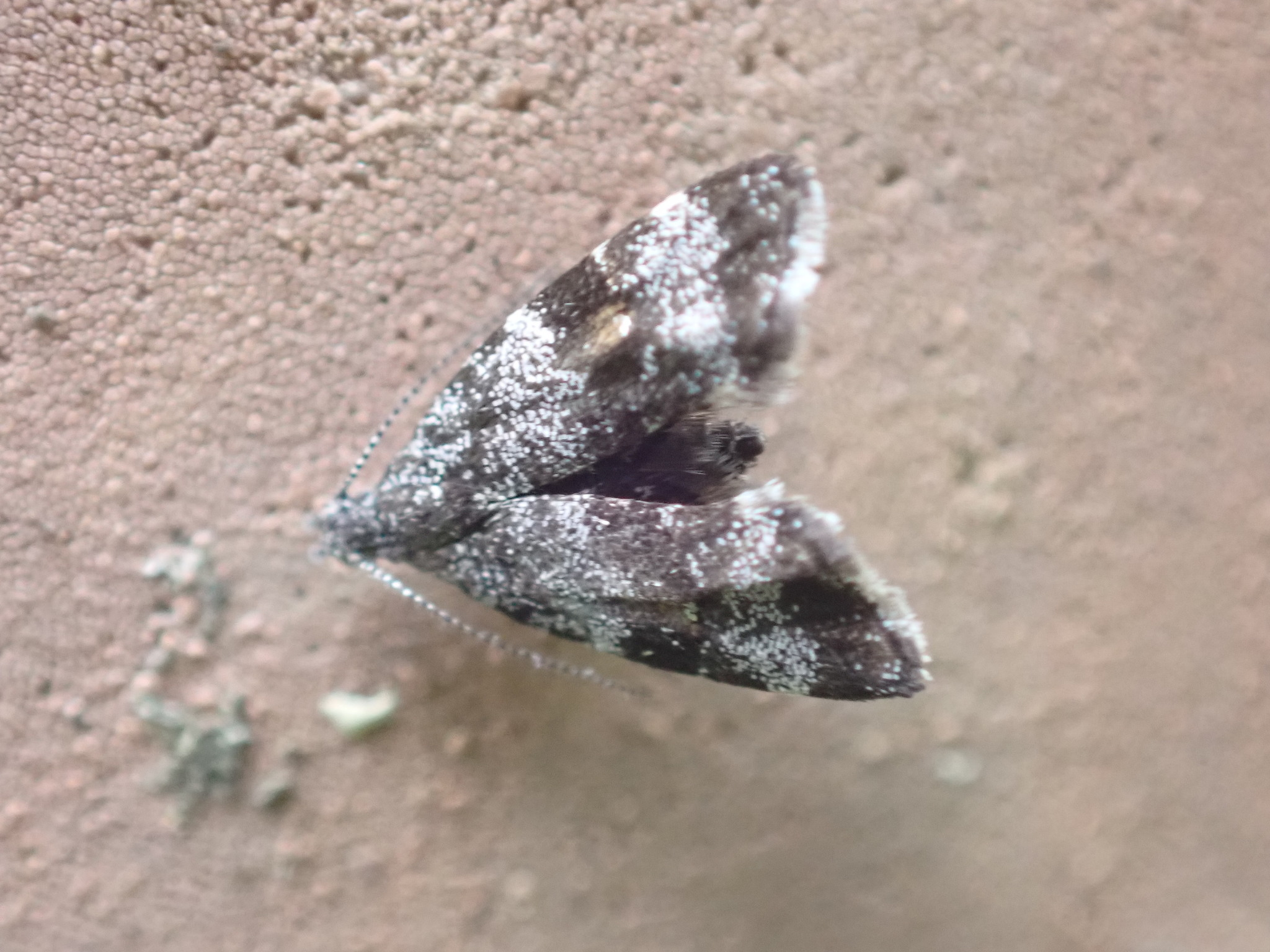

Scientific classification
- Kingdom: Animalia
- Phylum: Arthropoda
- Class: Insecta
- Order: Lepidoptera
- Family: Choreutidae
- Genus: Asterivora
- Species: A. antigrapha

Binomial name
- Asterivora antigrapha (Meyrick, 1911)

Synonyms
- Simaethis antigrapha Meyrick, 1911

= Asterivora antigrapha =

Species of moth

Asterivora antigrapha is a moth in the family Choreutidae. It is endemic to New Zealand and has been observed in the North and South Island. This species inhabits the edge of scrubland. The adults are on the wing in November and December. This species can be found flying the day. It has been hypothesised that this species hibernates over winter.

== Taxonomy ==
This species was first described by Edward Meyrick in 1911 using specimens collected at Kaitoke and Karori in December and March, and named Simaethis antigrapha. In 1927 Alfred Philpott studied the male genitalia of this species. George Hudson discussed and illustrated this species in his 1928 publication The butterflies and moths of New Zealand. In 1979 J. S. Dugdale placed this species within the genus Asterivora. In 1988 Dugdale confirmed this placement but pointed out that the lectotype and two paratypes were not in the Natural History Museum, London. He stated that the specimens in the Natural History Museum, London were either dated November or 1910.

== Description ==
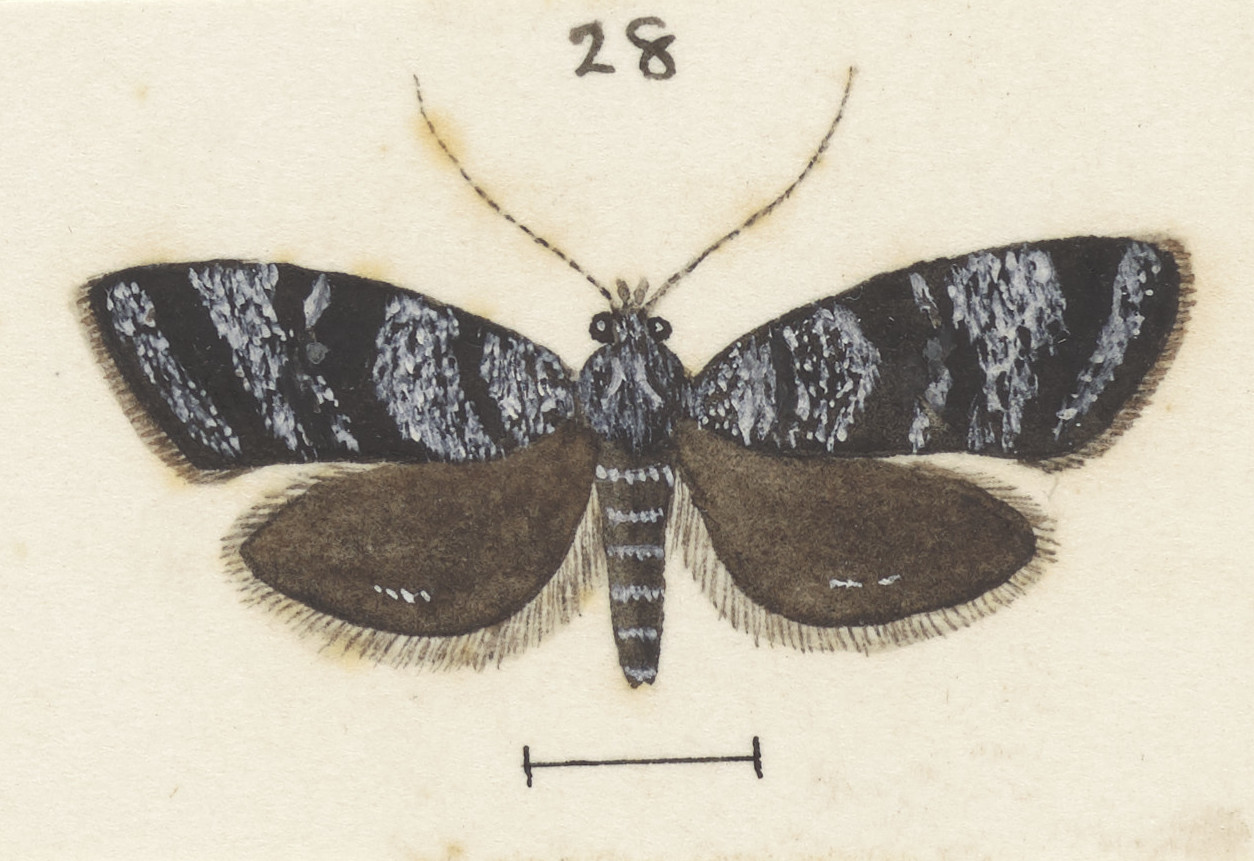
Illustration of male A. antigrapha.

The wingspan is 10–11 mm. The head and thorax are dark fuscous irrorated (speckled) with white. The antennae are dark fuscous dotted with white. The abdomen is dark fuscous, with a series of white scales on the segmental margins. The dark fuscous forewings are suboblong, moderate, the costa gently arched, the apex obtuse, the termen nearly straight and oblique. There is a basal patch and two irregular rather curved shades of purplish-white irroration almost wholly occupying the anterior half of the wing, the last running from a small white spot before the middle of the costa to the middle of the dorsum. There is also a small transverse-linear pale golden-metallic mark on the end of the cell. The dark fuscous hindwings are ovate-triangular, the termen is slightly rounded.

== Distribution ==
This species is endemic to New Zealand and has been observed in the North and South Islands.

== Habitat ==
This species can be found on the edge of scrubland.

== Behaviour ==
The adults of this species are in on the wing in November and December. This species can be found flying the day. Hudson stated that old specimens can be found in early spring and he hypothesised that this was as a result them hibernating over winter.
