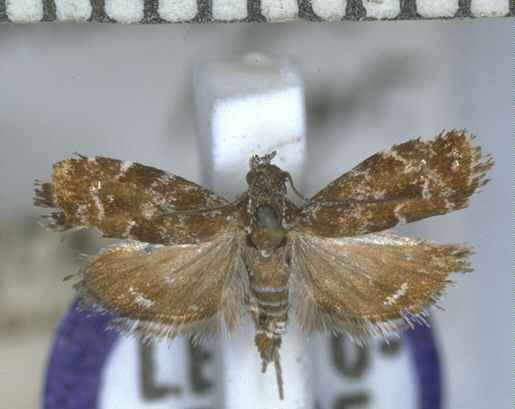
- Male holotype

Scientific classification
- Kingdom: Animalia
- Phylum: Arthropoda
- Class: Insecta
- Order: Lepidoptera
- Family: Choreutidae
- Genus: Asterivora
- Species: A. analoga

Binomial name
- Asterivora analoga (Meyrick, 1912)

Synonyms
- Simaethis analoga Meyrick, 1912

= Asterivora analoga =

Species of moth, endemic to New Zealand

Asterivora analoga is a moth of the family Choreutidae. It is endemic to New Zealand and has been observed in both the North and South Islands. Adults are on the wing in December and January.

== Taxonomy ==
This species was first described by Edward Meyrick using specimens collected at Mount Arthur at altitudes of 4000 ft in January and named Simaethis analoga. Meyrick originally believed this species to be a form of Asterivora microlitha. In 1927 Alfred Philpott studied the male genitalia of this species. In 1928 George Hudson discussed and illustrated this species in his book The butterflies and moths of New Zealand. In 1979 J. S. Dugdale placed this species within the genus Asterivora. In 1988 Dugdale confirmed this placement. The male lectotype specimen, collected at Mount Arthur, is held at the Natural History Museum, London.

== Description ==
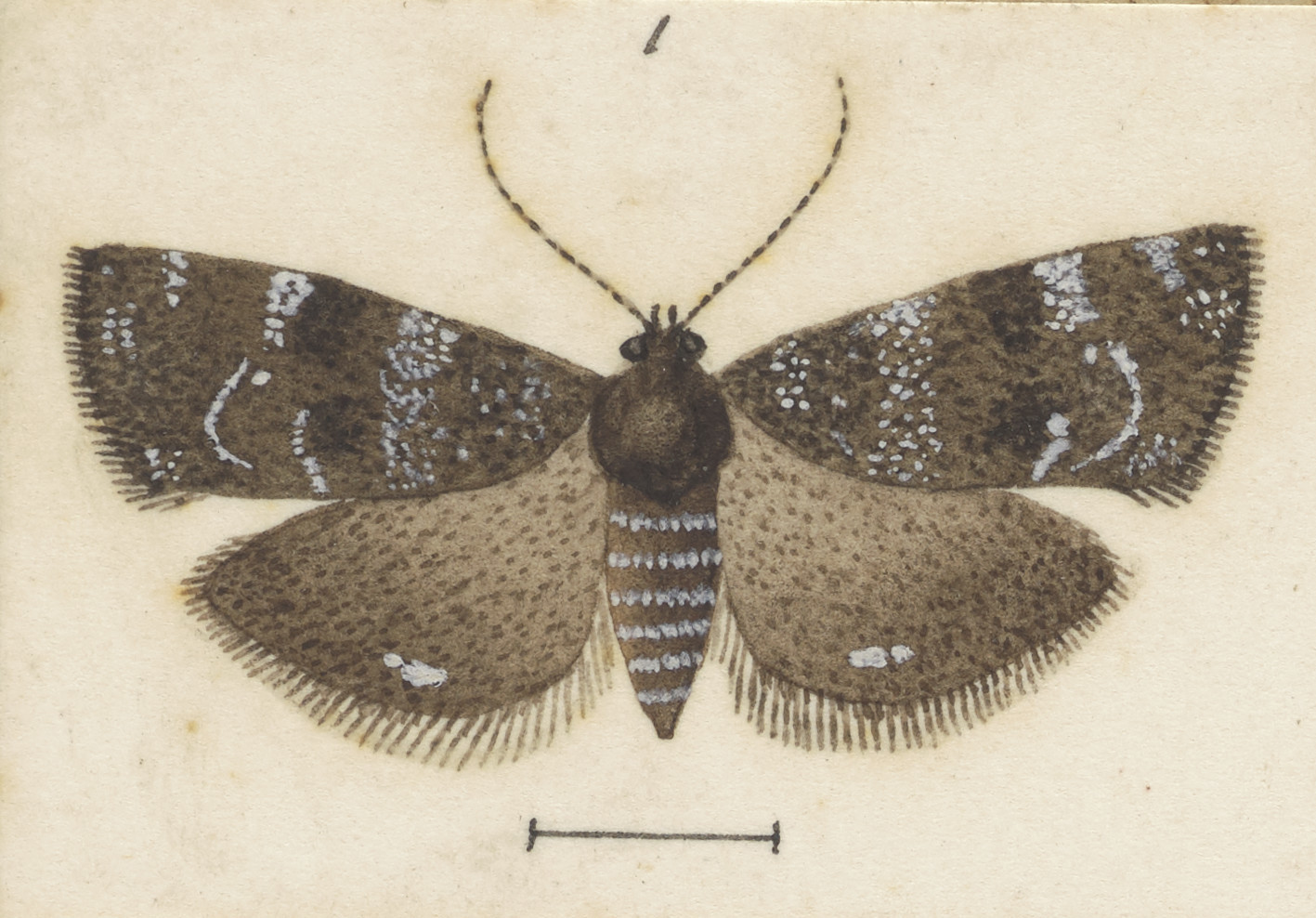
Illustration of A. analoga by George Hudson.

The wingspan is 8–9 mm. The head is dark fuscous, the face and sides of the crown are irrorated (speckled) with white. The antennae are dark fuscous dotted with white. The thorax is dark fuscous, somewhat sprinkled with white. The abdomen is dark fuscous, although the segmental margins are strongly white. The dark bronzy-fuscous forewings are rather elongate-triangular and the costa is gently arched, the apex obtuse and the termen slightly rounded and somewhat oblique. There are three curved cloudy transverse lines of white irroration on the anterior half and a white line beyond the middle forming a quadrangular loop behind a transverse-linear white discal mark. The upper side of the loop is silvery-metallic and there is a silvery-metallic dot on the upper extremity of the dorsal segment. The hindwings are fuscous, becoming dark fuscous posteriorly. There is a very short white detached transverse mark before the middle of the termen, and sometimes a dot on the tornus.

== Distribution ==
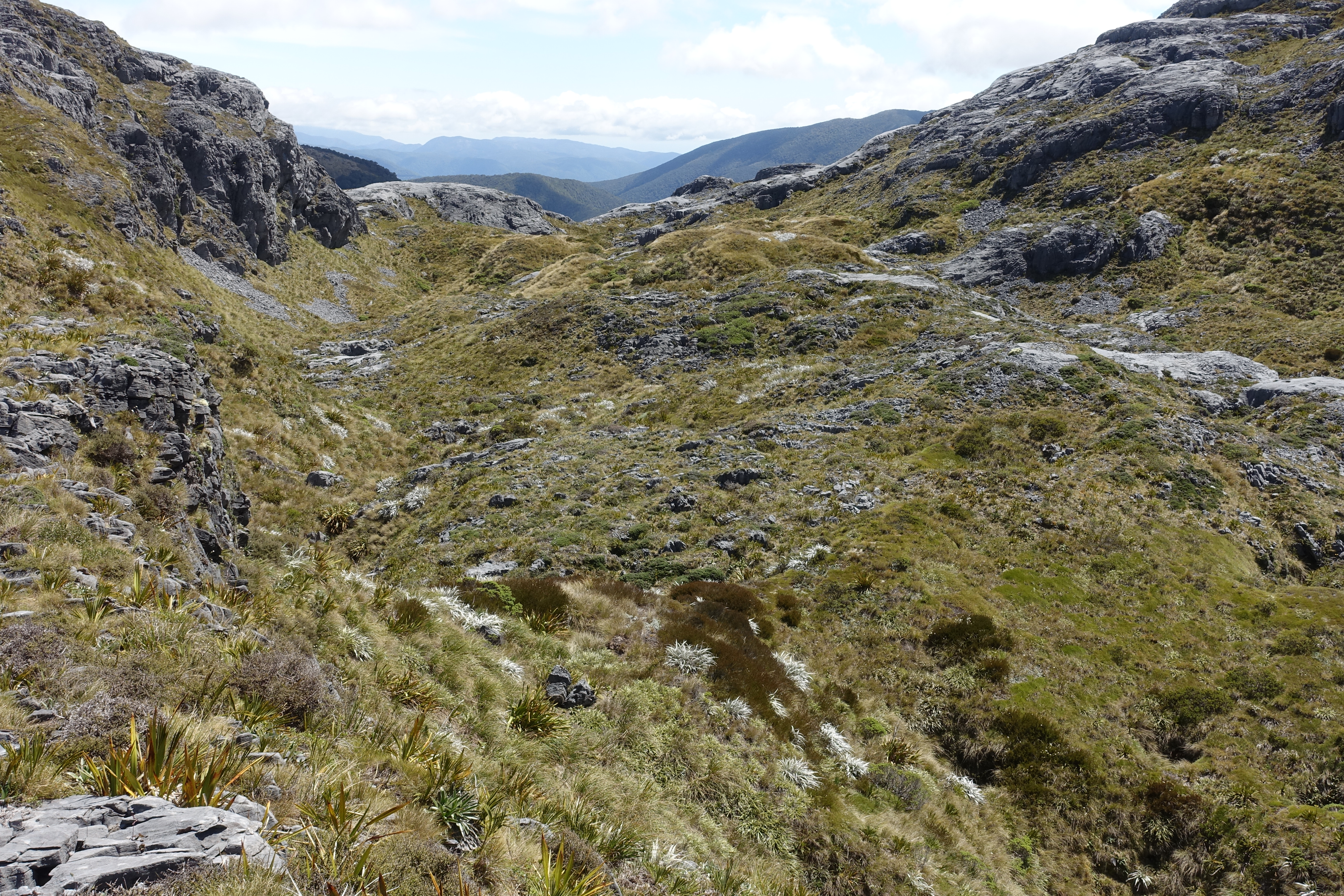
Mount Arthur, the type locality of this species.

This species is endemic to New Zealand. It has been observed in both the North and South Islands, including at Kaeo, Mount Taranaki, Mount Arthur, and in Otago

== Behaviour ==
This species is on the wing in January and December.
