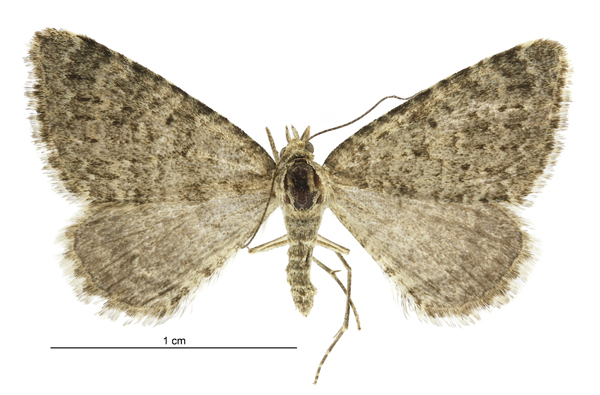
- Female
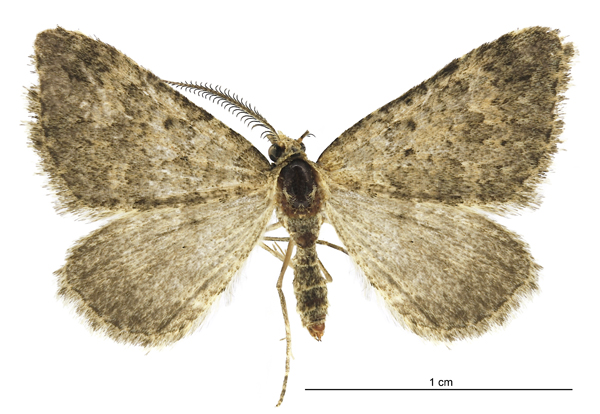
- Male

Scientific classification
- Domain: Eukaryota
- Kingdom: Animalia
- Phylum: Arthropoda
- Class: Insecta
- Order: Lepidoptera
- Family: Geometridae
- Genus: Helastia
- Species: H. scissa

Binomial name
- Helastia scissa Craw, 1987

= Helastia scissa =

Species of moth endemic to New Zealand

Helastia scissa is a moth of the family Geometridae. This species is endemic to New Zealand and has been observed only in the Marlborough region of the South Island. Adults are on the wing in February, are nocturnal and are attracted to light.

== Taxonomy ==
This species was first described by Robin Craw in 1987 using specimens collected on the slopes of Mount Tarndale in the Marlborough region in February by John S. Dugdale. The male holotype is held at the New Zealand Arthropod Collection.

== Description ==
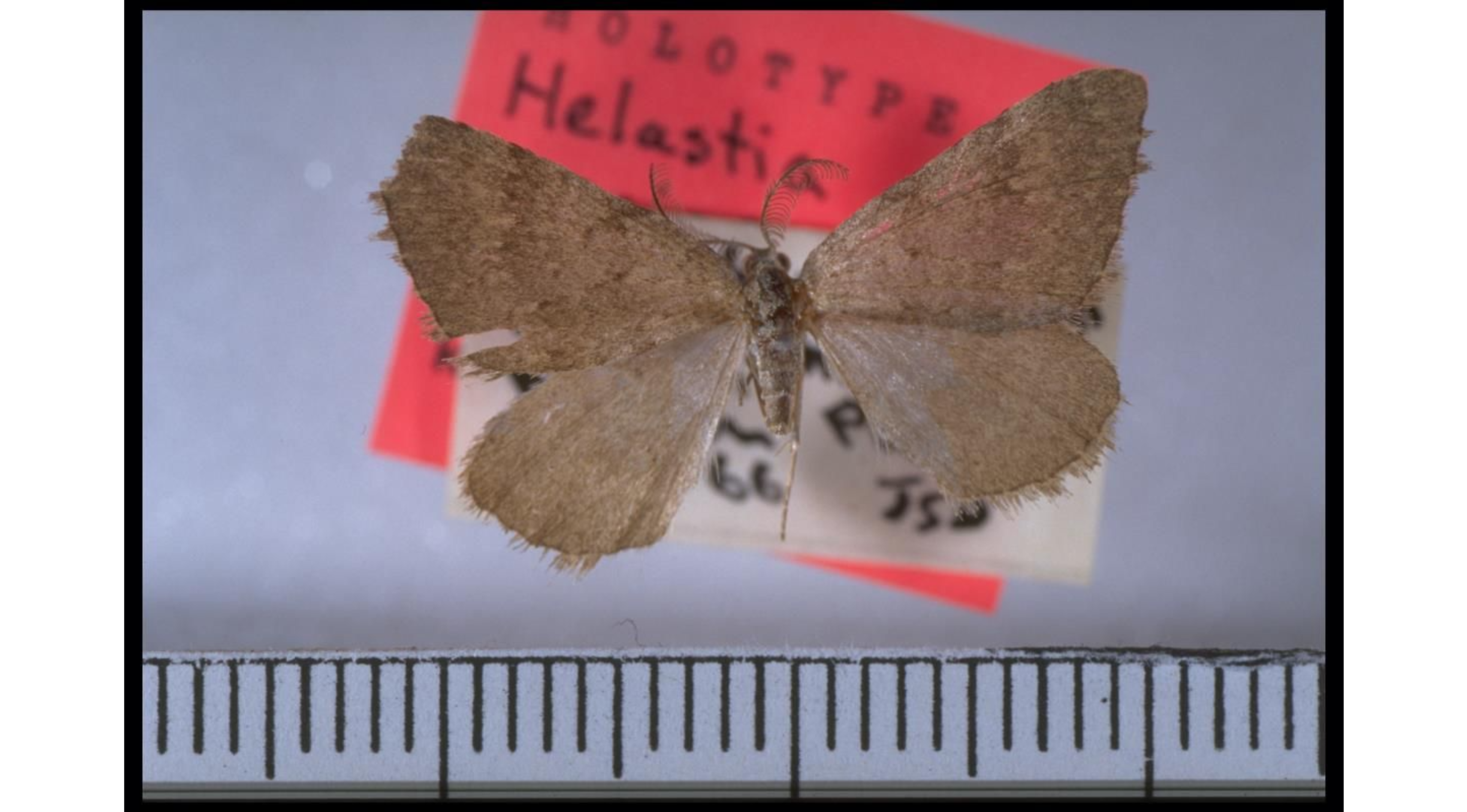
Male holotype specimen.

Craw described this species as follows:

Medium sized (r.f.l. 11.5-12.7 mm) triangular forewing. Upper- side forewing coloration and pattern dark brown with obscure wavy transverse lines. Male antennae bipectinated.

Craw goes on to distinguish this species from H. corcularia, H. semisignata, H. salmoni and H. ohauensis as a result of the differences of shape of both the male and female genitalia.

== Distribution ==
H. scissa is endemic to New Zealand. It is found in the South Island and has only been observed in Marlborough.

== Behaviour ==
Adults of this species have been observed on the wing in February. They are nocturnal and are attracted to light.
