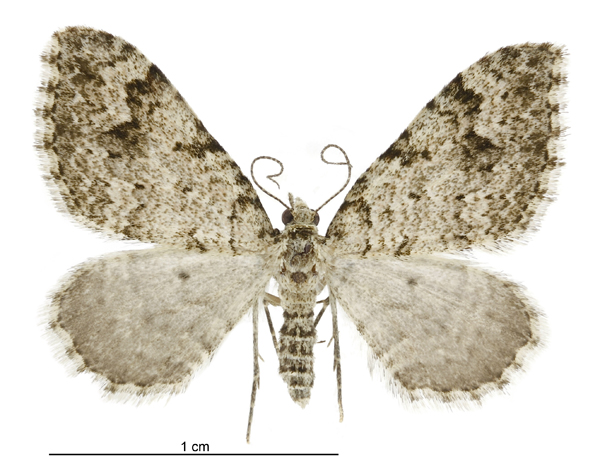
- Female
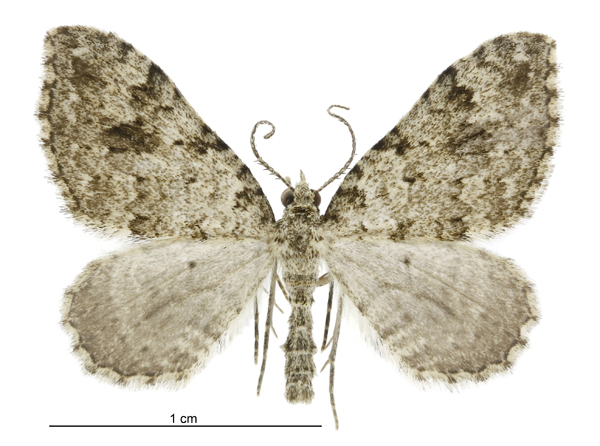
- Male

Scientific classification
- Kingdom: Animalia
- Phylum: Arthropoda
- Clade: Pancrustacea
- Class: Insecta
- Order: Lepidoptera
- Family: Geometridae
- Genus: Helastia
- Species: H. cinerearia

Binomial name
- Helastia cinerearia (Doubleday, 1843)

Synonyms
- Cidaria cinerearia Doubleday, 1843; Larentia cinerearia (Doubleday. 1843); Xanthorhoe cinerearia (Doubleday, 1843); Cidaria adonata Felder & Rogenhofer, 1875; Larentia diffusaria Walker, 1862; Helastia eupitheciaria Guenee, 1868; Larentia infusata Walker, 1862; Larentia inoperata Walker, 1862; Larentia invexata Walker, 1862

= Helastia cinerearia =

Species of moth endemic to New Zealand

Helastia cinerearia is a moth of the family Geometridae. It is endemic to New Zealand and can be found in the North, South and Stewart Islands as well as on the Mercury and Chatham Islands. The preferred habitat of H. cinerearia includes urban gardens, various types of forest and sub alpine habitats. The larval host is lichen on rocks. The adult moths are on the wing all year round but are most commonly observed from September until February. Adult moths are nocturnal and have been observed feeding from and likely pollinating Hebe salicifolia, Hoheria lyallii and Leptospermum scoparium.

== Taxonomy ==
This species was first described by Edward Doubleday in 1843 and named Cidaria cinerearia. George Hudson illustrated and discussed this species under the name Xanthorhoe cinerearia in 1928 in his book The moths and butterflies of New Zealand. In 1939 Louis Beethoven Prout placed this species in the genus Larentia. In 1971 J. S. Dugdale placed this species in the genus Helastia and went on to confirm this placement in his 1988 publication Lepidoptera - annotated catalogue, and keys to family-group taxa. Robin C. Craw when revising the Helastia genus discussed this species in 1987. The male lectotype specimen collected by Andrew Sinclair in Auckland is held at the Natural History Museum, London.

== Description ==
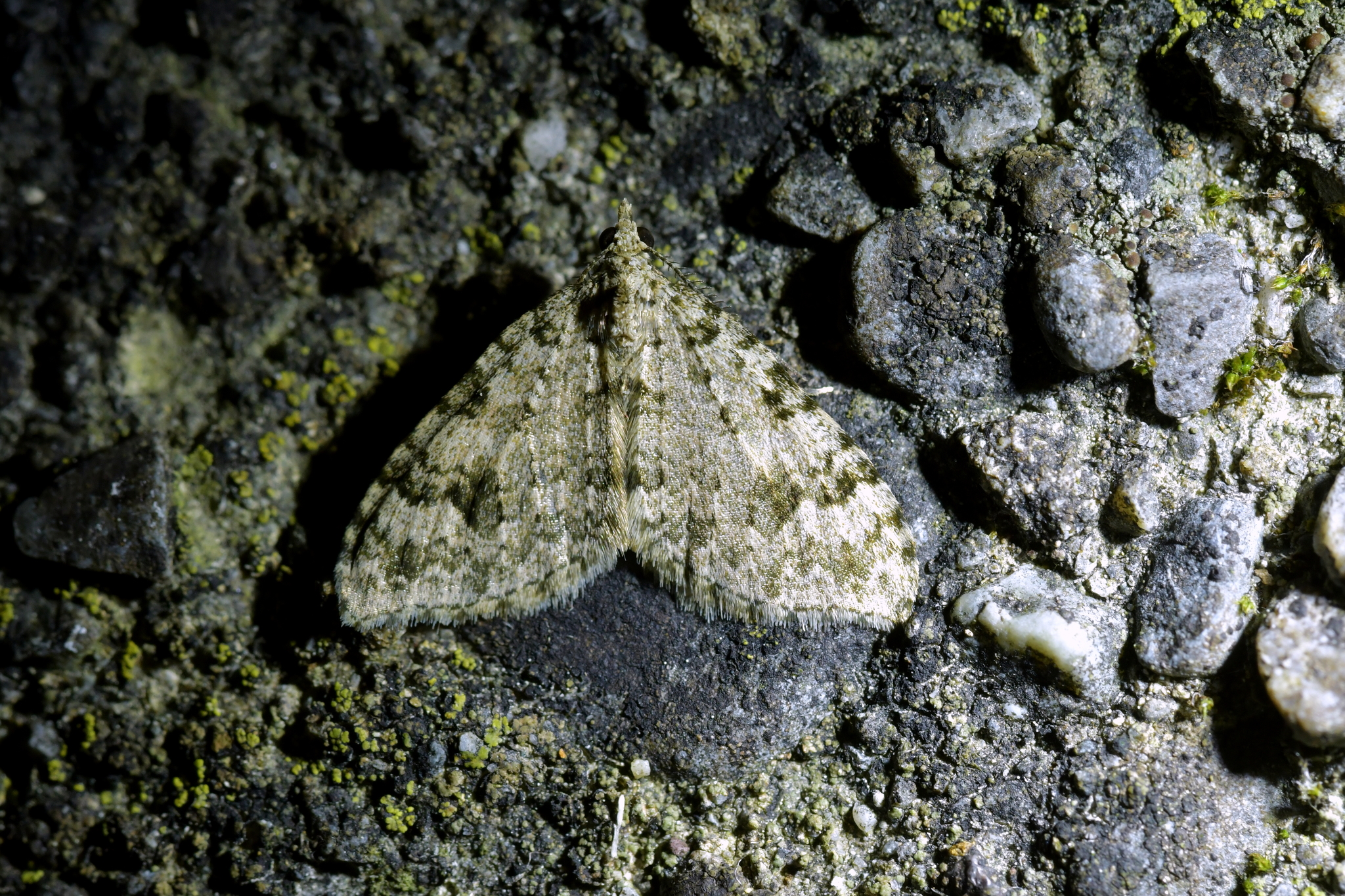
Observation of H. cinerearia.

This species was described by Edward Doubleday as follows:

Anterior wings acuminate, very slightly falcate, pale brownish-ash, with numerous fuscous strigae, mostly very slender, but occasionally uniting to form transverse bands, of which one, not very distinct, is situated near the base, another a little before, and a third a little beyond the middle, these two being very distinct near the costa, but almost obliterated near the inner margin. Near the outer margin, which is rather darker than the ground-colour of the wing, is a slender much-waved whitish striga, and near the middle of the costa is a minute white dot. Posterior ashy-white, rather shining, with numerous indistinct fuscous strigae. Antennae of the male emitting from their lower surface two stout pectinations of unequal length, closely approximating at their origin, clothed with a delicate silky pubescence; at the base and apex these pectinations are very short. Palpi rather long.

H. cinerearia is often confused with H. alba, H. christinae, H. mutabilis, and H. semisignata.

== Distribution ==
H. cinerearia is endemic to New Zealand. This species is found in the North, South and Stewart Islands and has also been observed on the Mercury Islands and Chatham Islands.

== Habitat and hosts ==
This species has been found in a variety of habitats including urban gardens, various types of forest and sub alpine habitats. The larval host is lichen on rocks.

== Behaviour ==
Adult moths are on the wing all year but are most commonly observed from September until February. Adult moths of H. cinerearia fly during dusk and at the evening and can be taken at light, sugar and at blossoms. Adult moths have been observed feeding from and likely pollinating Hebe salicifolia, Hoheria lyallii and Leptospermum scoparium. Adults have been observed resting on stones, or bare ground, and are very partial to the sides of road cuttings where the adults sometimes congregate in considerable numbers. Adult moths are also fond of resting on walls and fences.
