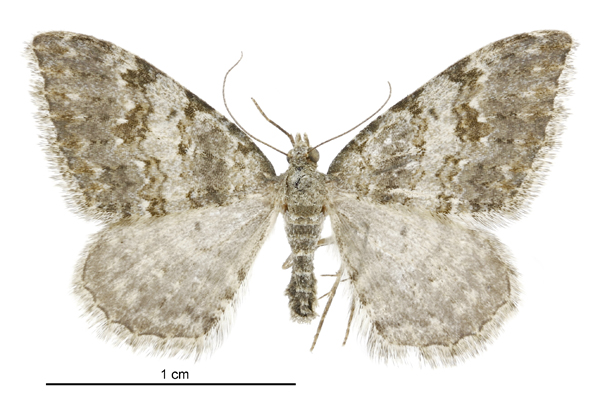
- Female
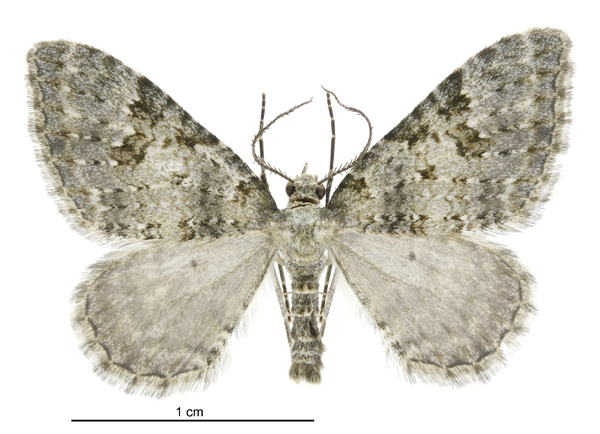
- Male

Scientific classification
- Kingdom: Animalia
- Phylum: Arthropoda
- Class: Insecta
- Order: Lepidoptera
- Family: Geometridae
- Genus: Helastia
- Species: H. christinae

Binomial name
- Helastia christinae Craw, 1987

= Helastia christinae =

Species of moth endemic to New Zealand

Helastia christinae is a moth of the family Geometridae. It was first described by Robin C. Craw in 1987. This species is endemic to New Zealand and has been confirmed as being observed at Dunedin, and the Central Otago and Otago Lakes areas. H. christinae inhabits subalpine to lowland areas frequenting river banks and stream sides. The food source for the larvae of this species are lichens. The adults of this species are on the wing in October to December. They are nocturnal and are attracted to light. Adult moths can be distinguished from similar appearing species in the genus Helastia as they have a "conspicuous transverse grey-ish white median band on the upper side of the forewing".

== Taxonomy ==
This species was first described by Robin C. Craw in 1987 using specimens collected by J. S. Dugdale at Roaring Meg Creek, Kawarau Gorge in Central Otago. The male holotype specimen, collected in November, is held at the New Zealand Arthropod Collection. This species was named in honour of Christine Patrick, the first wife of the New Zealand lepidopterist Brian Patrick.

== Description ==
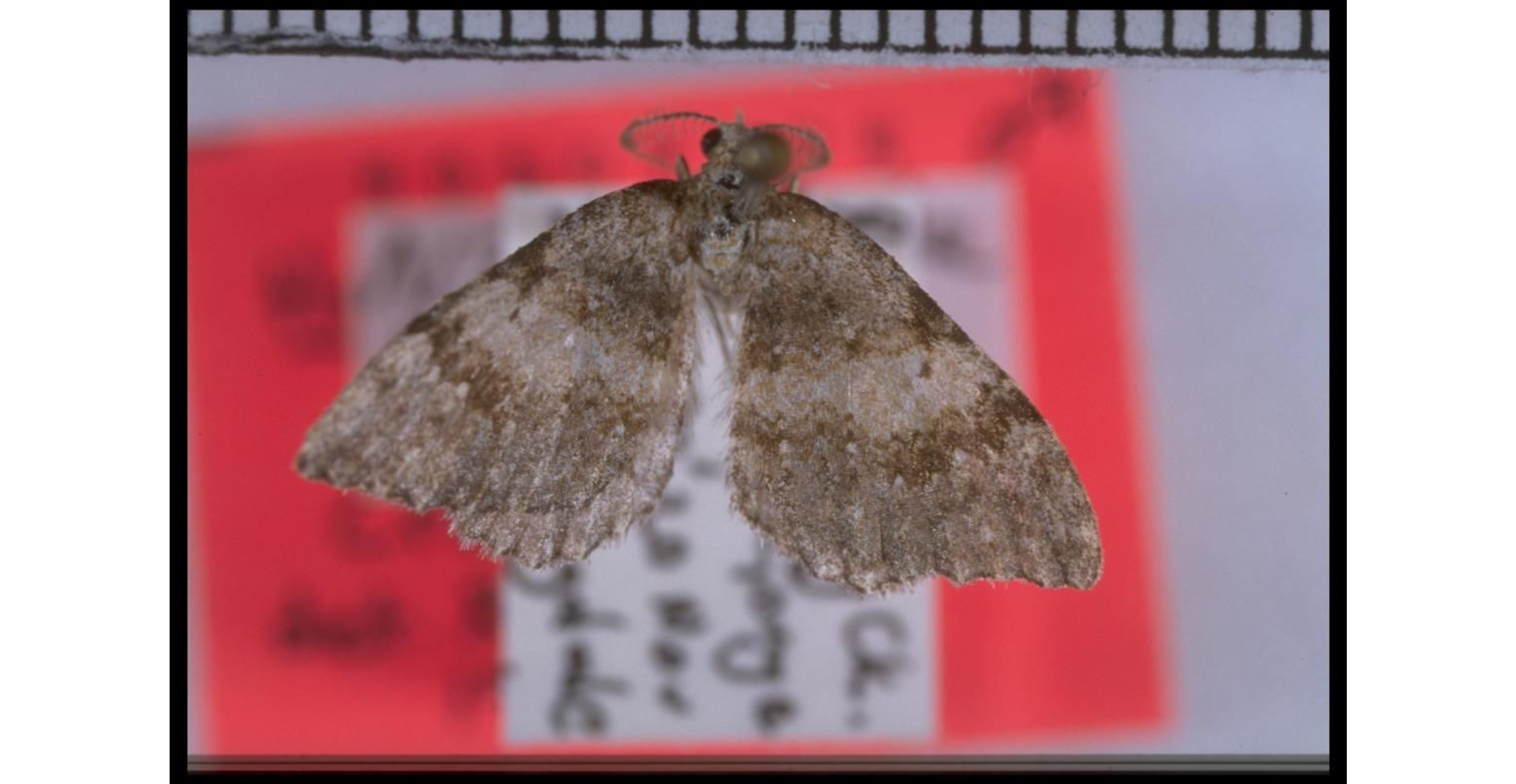
Male holotype of H. christinae.

Craw described this species as follows:

Small to medium sized (r.f.l. 9-12mm) triangular forewing. Upper side forewing greyish green with light to dark grey and yellowish-ochreous wavy transverse lines; conspicuous transverse greyish white median band with black to brown discal spot. Male antennae bipectinated.

H. christinae can be mistaken for H. alba, H. mutabilis and H. plumbea but H. christinae has a "conspicuous transverse grey-ish white median band on the upper side of the forewing" that distinguishes it from these other species.

== Distribution ==
H. christinae is endemic to New Zealand. H. christinae has been observed in the South Island at Dunedin and in the Central Otago and the Otago Lakes areas. Craw states H. christinae may be present in other parts of the South Island but that these records need further research to confirm the presence of this species.

== Habitat and host species ==
This species inhabits subalpine to lowland areas, frequenting river banks and stream sides. The larvae of this species eat lichens.

== Behaviour ==
Adults of this species are on the wing in October to December. Adults are nocturnal and are drawn to light.
