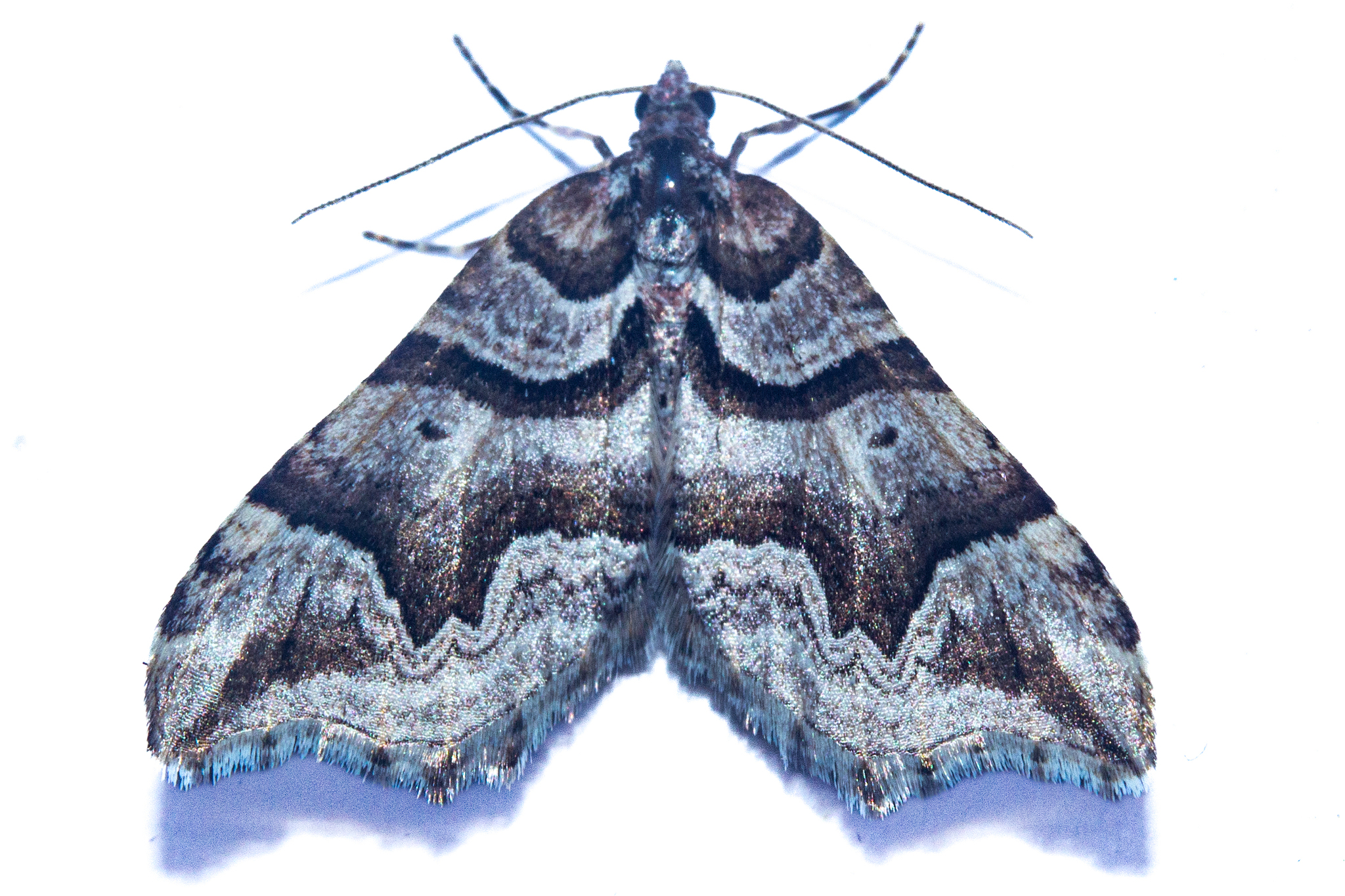

Conservation status
- Relict (NZ TCS)

Scientific classification
- Kingdom: Animalia
- Phylum: Arthropoda
- Class: Insecta
- Order: Lepidoptera
- Family: Geometridae
- Genus: Helastia
- Species: H. angusta

Binomial name
- Helastia angusta Craw, 1987

= Helastia angusta =

Species of moth

Helastia angusta is a moth of the family Geometridae. This species is endemic to New Zealand and has been observed in the Mackenzie and Otago Lakes districts of the South Island. The preferred habitat of this species is montane areas. Adults have been observed on the wing from October until December. As at 2000, the larval host species is unknown. It is classified as "At Risk, Relict'" by the Department of Conservation.

== Taxonomy ==
This species was first described by Robin C. Craw in 1987 using specimens collected by John S. Dugdale at Moke Lake and a specimen collected at the Humboltd Mountains. It has been stated that the separation of this species from its close relative H. expolita is controversial. The male holotype specimen, collected at Moke Lake, is held at the New Zealand Arthropod Collection.

== Description ==
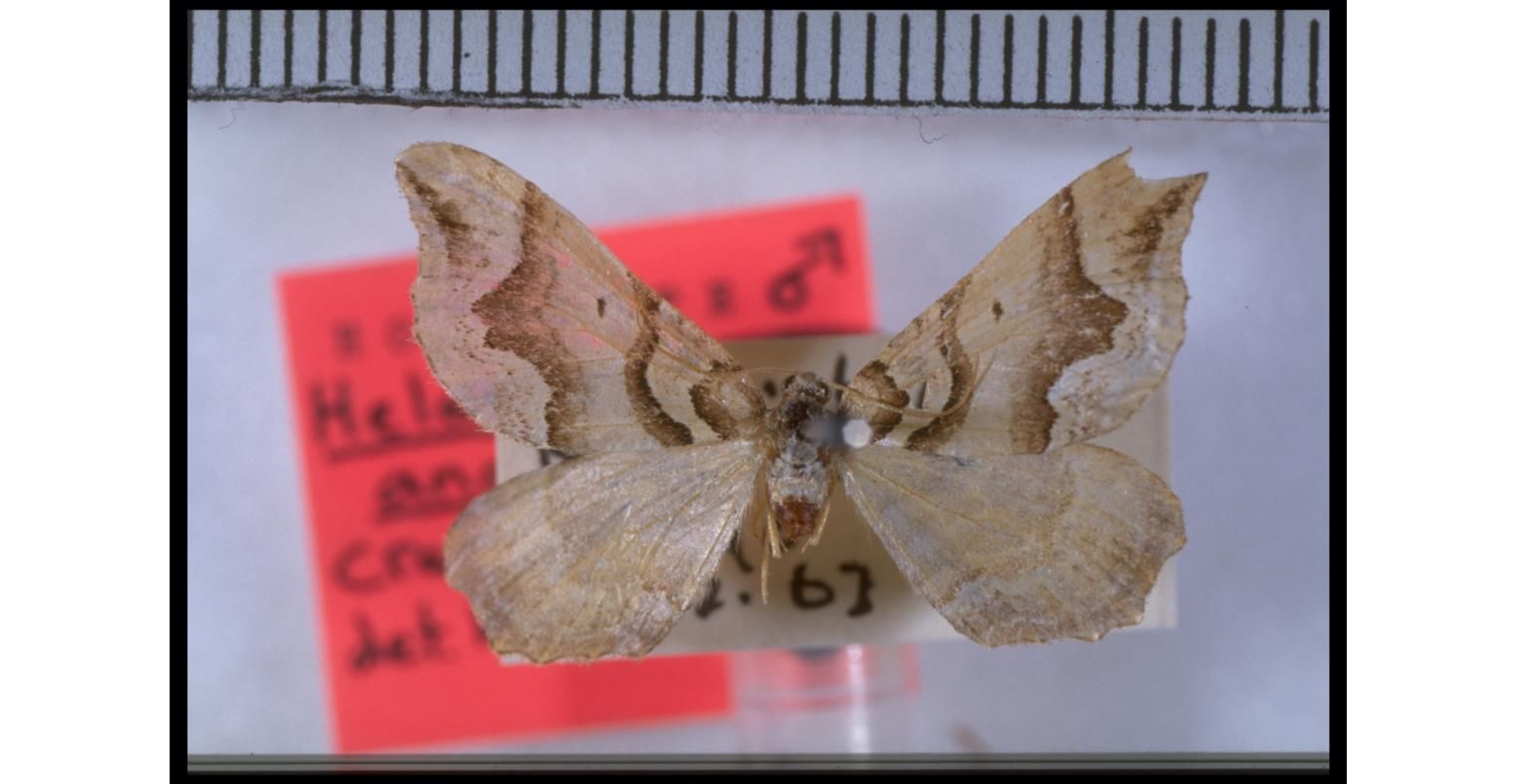
Helastia angust male holotype

Craw described the species as follows:

Medium sized (r.f.l. 13.5-14.1 mm) narrowly falcate forewing. Upperside forewing coloured whitish purplish brown with darker transverse basal, antemedial and postmedial lines; oblique purplish brown apical streak. Postmedial line with distinct double toothed median projection; basal line evenly curved, no angular projection. Male antennae ciliated.

Although similar in appearance to its relative H. expolita, H.angusta can be distinguished by its narrower forewing and the more rounded appearance of its underside basal line. The entomologist Graham White has stated that the size of the discal dot in H. angusta is smaller than that of H. expolita.

== Distribution ==
This species is endemic to New Zealand. It occurs in the Otago Lakes and Mackenzie areas.

== Habitat and host species ==
The preferred habitat of H. angusta is montane areas. The host species for the larvae of H. angusta is unknown but it has been hypothesised it may be a shrub species. Moth species closely related to H. angusta have larvae that feed Helichrysum lanceolatum.

== Behaviour ==
Adults have been observed on the wing from October until December. This species is nocturnal and are attracted to light.

== Conservation status ==
This moth is classified under the New Zealand Threat Classification system as being "At Risk, Relict".
