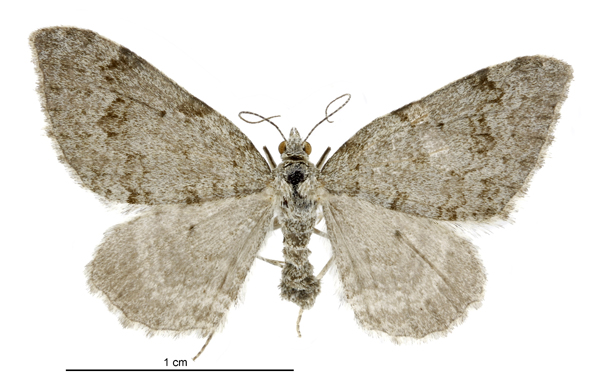
- Female
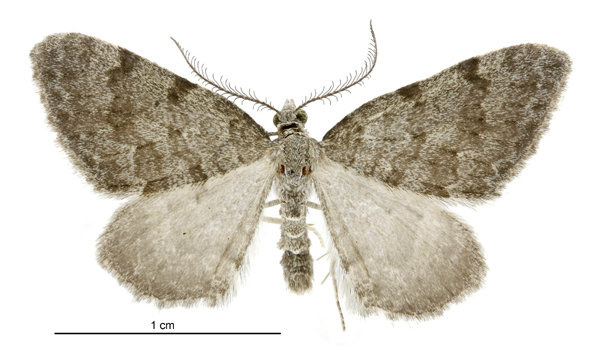
- Male

Scientific classification
- Kingdom: Animalia
- Phylum: Arthropoda
- Class: Insecta
- Order: Lepidoptera
- Family: Geometridae
- Genus: Helastia
- Species: H. farinata

Binomial name
- Helastia farinata (Warren, 1896)

Synonyms
- Xanthorhoe farinata Warren, 1896; Larentia farinata (Warren, 1896)

= Helastia farinata =

Species of moth endemic to New Zealand

Helastia farinata is a moth of the family Geometridae. It was first described by William Warren in 1896. This species is endemic to New Zealand and is found in the North Island. H. farinata inhabits shady and damp forest ravines.

== Taxonomy ==
It was first described by William Warren in 1896 using specimens collected by George Hudson in Wellington and named Xanthorhoe farinata. In 1912 Louis Beethoven Prout placed this species in the genus Larentia and affirmed this placement again in 1939. Edward Meyrick returned this species to the genus Xanthorhoe in 1917. George Hudson followed this placement when he discussed and illustrated this species in his 1928 publication The butterflies and moths of New Zealand. In 1971 J. S. Dugdale placed this species in the genus Helastia and this placement was confirmed by Robin C. Craw when he revised the genus in 1987. Dugdale agreed with this placement in his 1988 publication Lepidoptera - annotated catalogue, and keys to family-group taxa. The male lectotype is held at the Natural History Museum, London.

== Description ==
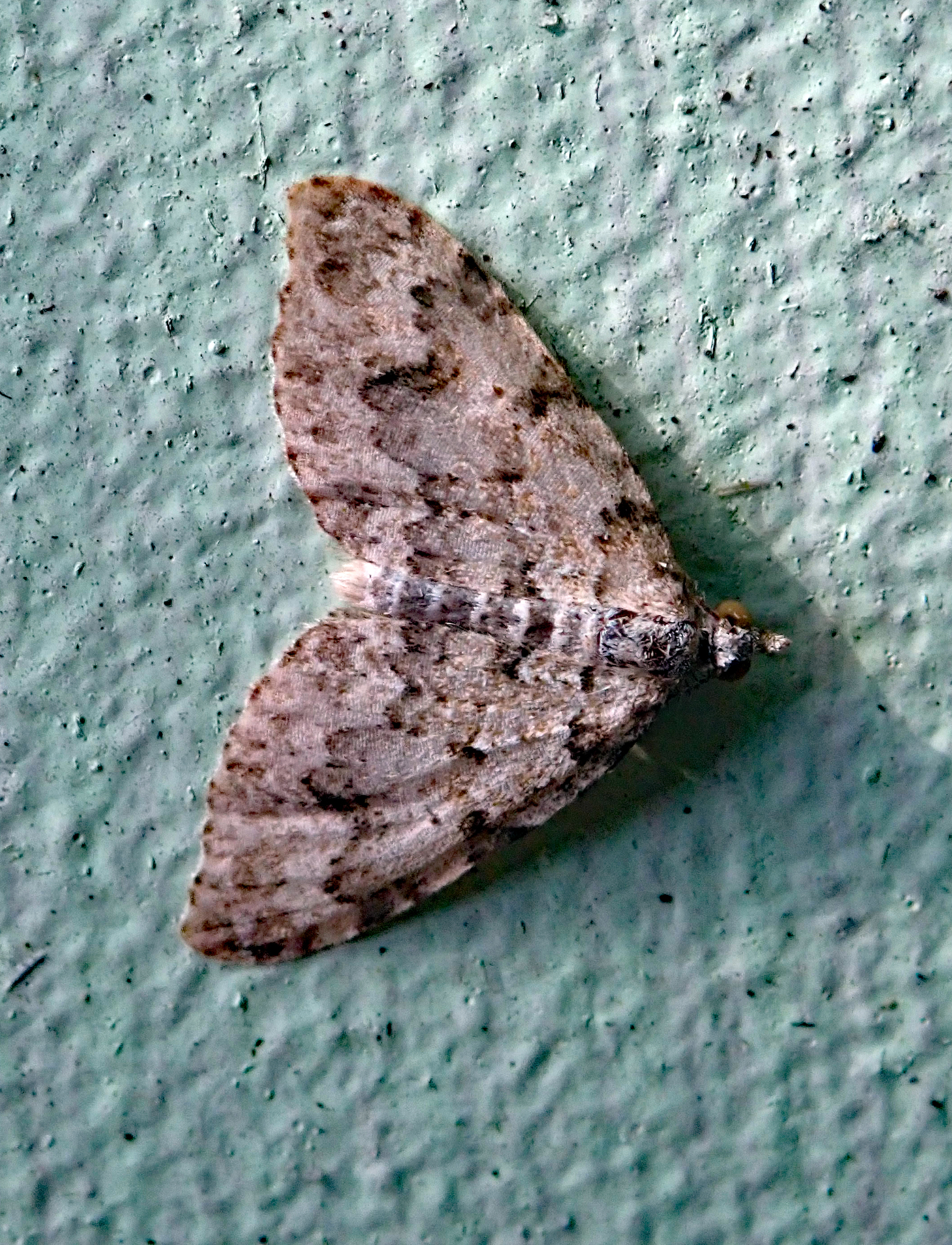
Observation of H. farinata.

Warren described this species as follows:

Forewings: grey, with very fine dark irroration; the lines blackish; first near base, angled in cell and preceded by a finer line; second line beyond one-third, angled on the subcostal, then oblique inwards and waved to inner margin before middle, followed by a similar finer line, the two marked with black on the median; outer line at two-thirds, angled on vein 6, bidentate below median, then incurved and wavy, preceded by a similar finer line; submarginal line pale grey, denticulate, with a darker grey shade on both sides; fringe grey, slightly mottled with dark, with no dark basal line; in the pale spaces before and beyond the central fascia, and in that fascia itself, traces can be seen of darker transverse lines; the space between the double lines forming the edges of the central fascia is filled up with blackish from the costa to the angulation.

Hindwings : paler grey, with traces of a sinuate still paler submarginal fascia with a dark line through it.
Underside: grey, with the outer line blackish. Head, thorax, and abdomen all grey; forelegs blackish, with white joints.

Expanse of wings : 26 mm.

== Distribution ==
This species is endemic to New Zealand. H. farinata is found in the North Island only in the Bay of Plenty, Taranaki, Gisborne, Hawkes Bay and Wellington regions. Although George Hudson records in 1939 that this species was observed in Awapiri, Marlborough, Craw pointes out that in Te Papa there is a faded specimen of Dichromodes sphaeriata which may have led Hudson to this conclusion.

== Habitat ==
The preferred habitat of H. farinata is shady and damp forest ravines.

== Behaviour ==
Adults of this species have been observed to be on the wing in January, February and September. Adults are nocturnal and are attracted to light.
