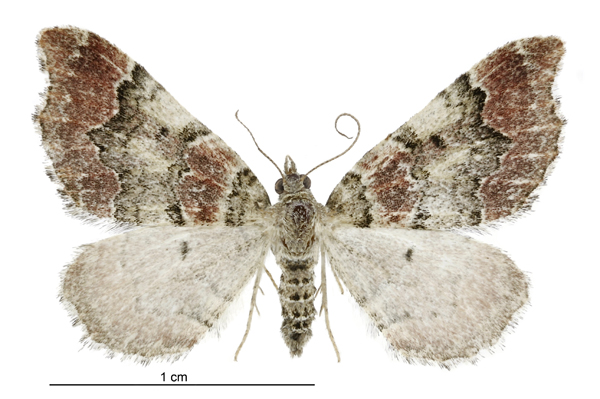
- Female
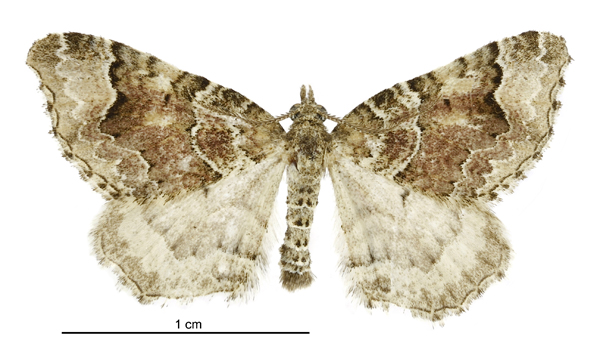
- Male

Scientific classification
- Kingdom: Animalia
- Phylum: Arthropoda
- Class: Insecta
- Order: Lepidoptera
- Family: Geometridae
- Genus: Helastia
- Species: H. cryptica

Binomial name
- Helastia cryptica Craw, 1987

= Helastia cryptica =

Species of moth endemic to New Zealand

Helastia cryptica is a moth of the family Geometridae. It was first described by Robin C. Craw in 1987. This species is endemic to New Zealand and is found from mid Canterbury south. This preferred habitat of H. cryptica is native forest and scrub at altitudes ranging from lowland to subalpine. It has also been observed in human modified habitat. The larvae of this species has been observed on Melicytus alpinus, likely feeding on perched dead leaves and have been hypothesised as feeding on epiphytic mosses. Adults are nocturnal and are on the wing from November until January. Externally this species is indistinguishable from its close relative H. cymozeucta. However the distribution of these two species can assist in the correct identification of specimens.

== Taxonomy ==
This species was first described by Craw in 1987. The male holotype, collected by Craw near the River Jordan in Paradise, Otago Lakes area, is held in the New Zealand Arthropod Collection.

== Description ==
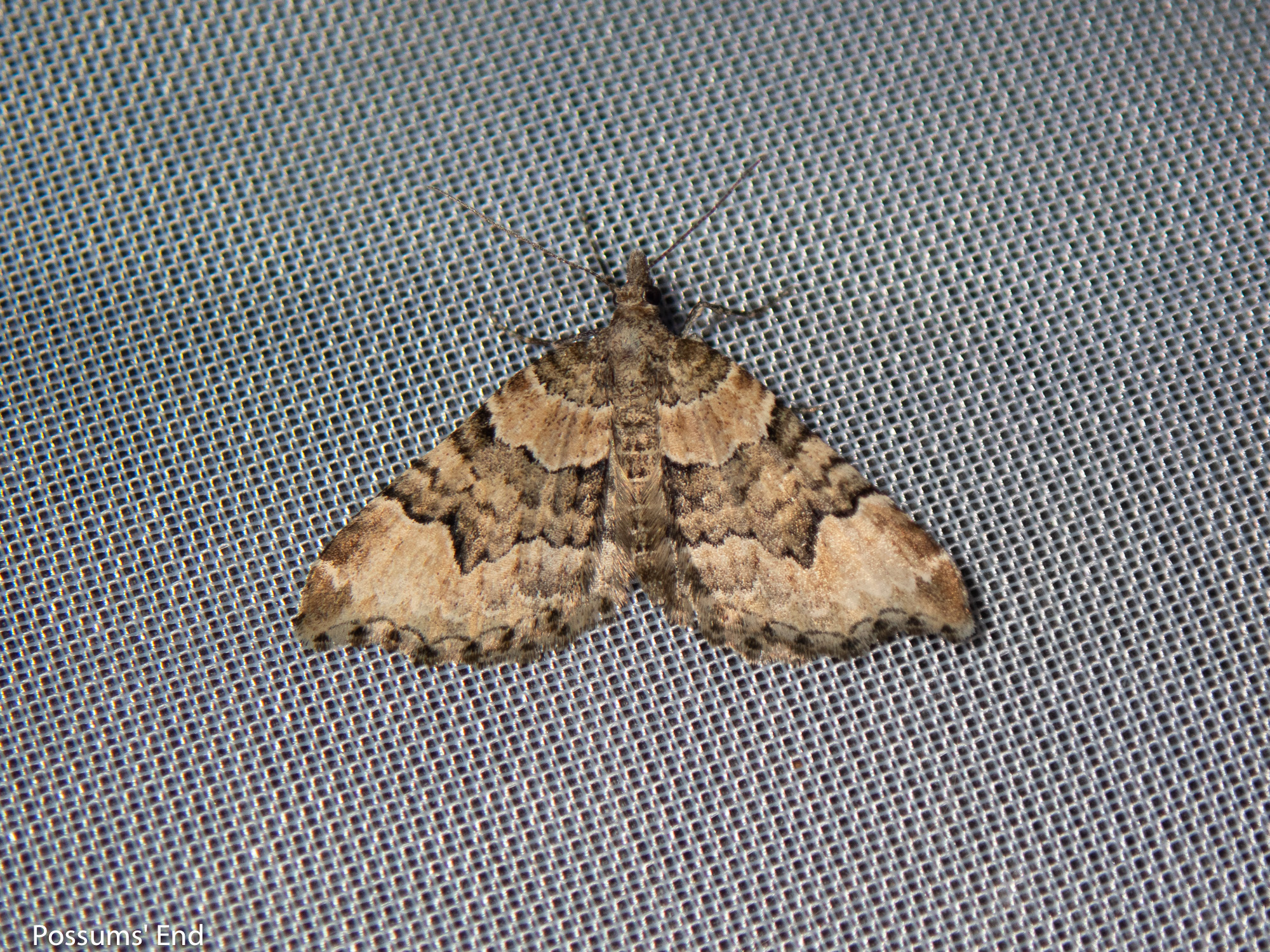
Observation of H. cryptica.

Craw described this species as follows:

Medium sized (r.f.l.10.4-13 mm) falcate forewing. Upper side fore- and hind wing coloration and pattern very variable ranging from reddish, green and brown to creamy white and blackish brown with wavy transverse black and white lines. Postmedial line with distinct median double toothed projection. Male antennae bipectinated.

The genitalia of the adults of this species make it easily distinguishable from its close relative H. cymozeucta. However Craw stated the two are impossible to distinguish externally. The distribution of the two species can help inform identification as H. cryozeucta is found in the North Island and the upper parts of the South Island while H. cryptica is restricted to Mid Canterbury south.

== Distribution ==
H. cryptica is endemic to New Zealand. It is found only in the South Island in the Mid Canterbury, Mackenzie, Dunedin, Central Otago, Otago Lakes and Fiordland areas.

== Habitat and hosts ==
The preferred habitat of this species is native forest and scrub as well as modified habitat. H. cryptica can be found at altitudes ranging from lowland to subalpine. The larvae of this species have been found on Melicytus alpinus likely feeding on perched dead leaves. It has also been hypothesised that the larvae of this species feed on epiphytic mosses.

== Behaviour ==
Adults are nocturnal and are on the wing from November until January.
