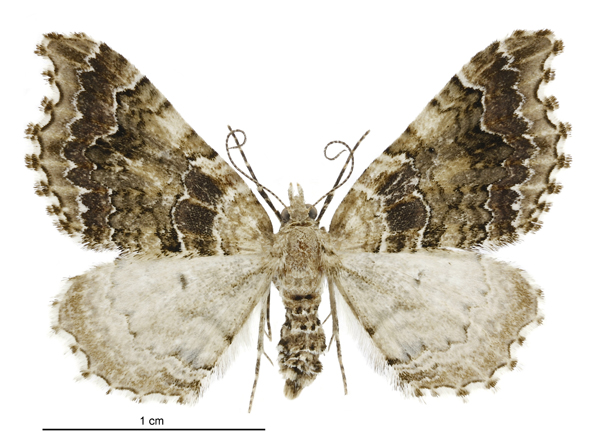
- Female
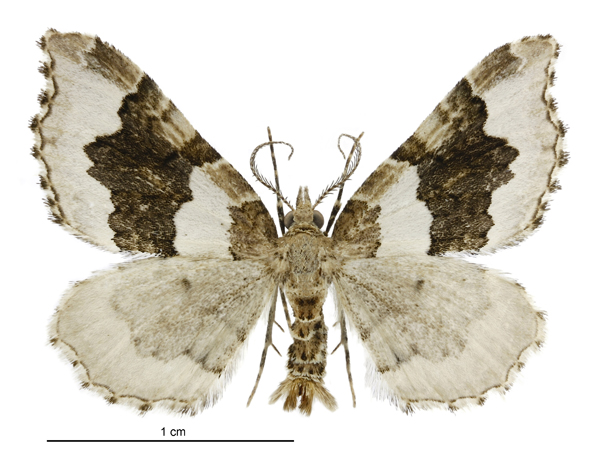
- Male

Scientific classification
- Kingdom: Animalia
- Phylum: Arthropoda
- Class: Insecta
- Order: Lepidoptera
- Family: Geometridae
- Genus: Helastia
- Species: H. cymozeucta

Binomial name
- Helastia cymozeucta (Meyrick, 1913)

Synonyms
- Xanthorhoe cymozeucta Meyrick, 1913; Xanthorhoe maoriaria Hudson, 1939; Helastia maoriaria (Hudson, 1939)

= Helastia cymozeucta =

Species of moth endemic to New Zealand

Helastia cymozeucta is a moth of the family Geometridae. It was first described by Edward Meyrick in 1913. This species is endemic to New Zealand and is found in both the North and the upper parts of the South Island. The adults of this species have been observed on the wing from November to January as well as in March.

== Taxonomy ==
This species was first described by Edward Meyrick in 1913 using specimens collected by George Hudson at Ohakune and named Xanthorhoe cymozeucta. Hudson used this same name when he discussed and illustrated the species in his 1928 book The butterflies and moths of New Zealand. In 1939 Hudson, thinking he was describing a new species, also named it Xanthorhoe maoriaria. In 1971 J. S. Dugdale placed both X. cymozeucta and X. maoriaria in the genus Helastia. Craw synonymised X. maoriaria with X. cymozeucta in his revision of the genus Helastia. The male lectotype is held at the Natural History Museum, London.

== Description ==
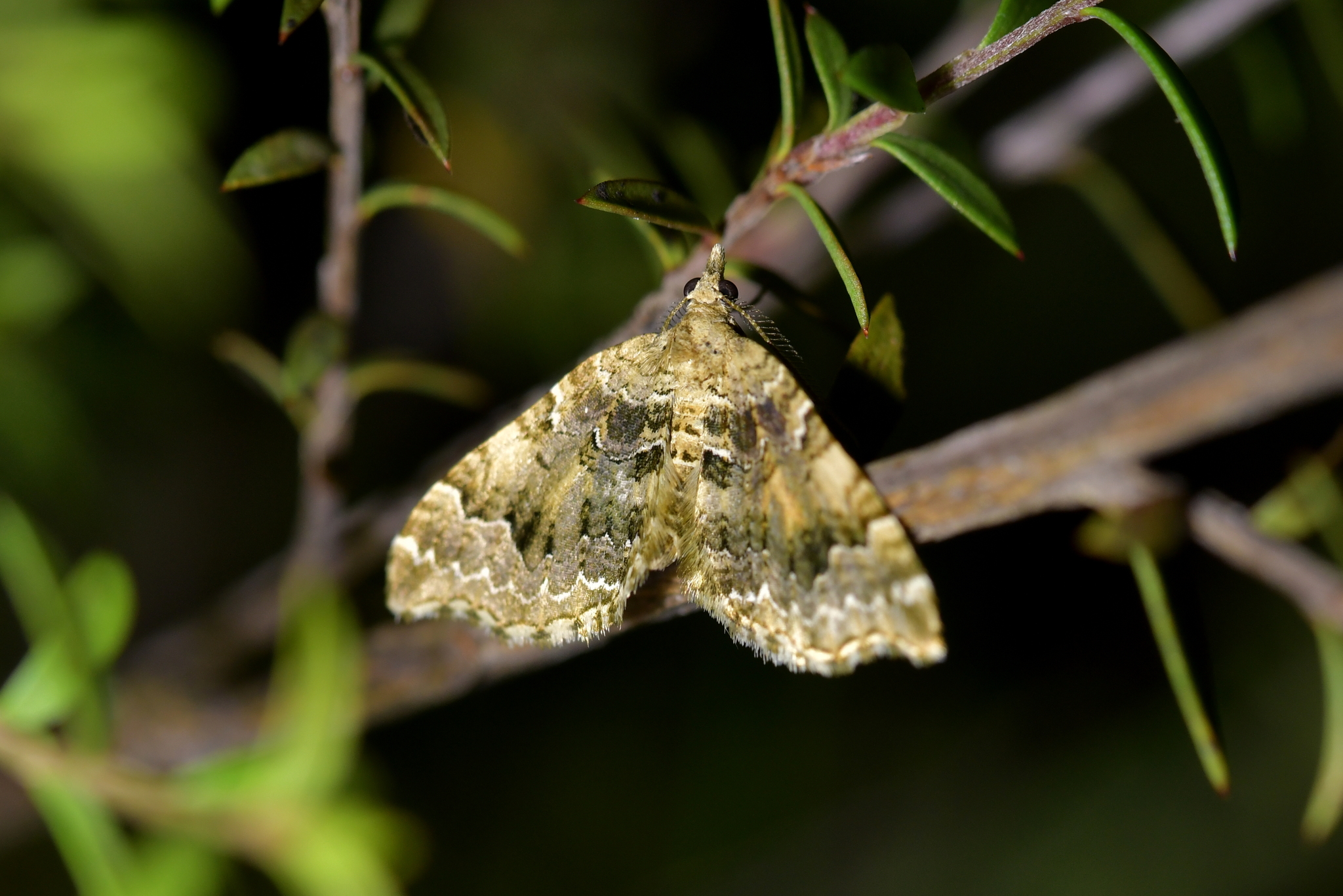
Observation of H. cymozeucta.

Meyrick described this species as follows:

♂♀. 23–25 mm. Head and thorax whitish-ochreous, face with conical tuft. Palpi 2 ⅔. Antennal pectinations in ♂ a 5, b 6. Abdomen whitish-ochreous sprinkled with fuscous, with double dorsal row of blackish spots. Forewings triangular, costa sinuate, apex obtuse, termen rather obliquely rounded, waved, subconcave on upper half; greyish-ochreous, irregularly sprinkled with fuscous and dark fuscous, towards costa and termen whitishochreous; first two fasciae each formed of two or three striae of blackish irroration; third and fourth fasciae of two and three blackish striae respectively, more or less suffused with fuscous, third preceded and fourth followed by a white stria, fourth irregular and forming an obtuse obliquely bidentate projection in middle; a black transverse-linear discal mark between these; a waved white subterminal stria edged anteriorly with more or less darkfuscous suffusion, space between this and fourth fascia more or less suffused with dull brown-reddish; a spot of dark-fuscous suffusion before apex; an interrupted blackish terminal line: cilia whitish, barred with dark fuscous. Hindwings somewhat elongate, termen rounded, somewhat waved; greywhitish; median band indicated by traces of grey striae; a blackish linear discal dot: cilia whitish, with a series of small dark-grey spots.

The genitalia of the adults of this species make it easily distinguishable from its close relative H. cryptica. However Craw stated the two are impossible to distinguish externally. The distribution of the two species can help inform identification as H. cryozeucta is found in the North Island and the upper parts of the South Island while H. cryptica is restricted to Mid Canterbury south.

== Distribution ==
This species is endemic to New Zealand. It is found in the North Island in the Auckland, Waikato, Gisborne, Taupō and Wellington regions and in the northern parts of the South Island in the Nelson, Buller and Westland regions.

== Habitat ==
The preferred habitat of this species is native forest and scrub as well as modified habitat. H. cymozeucta can be found at altitudes ranging from lowland to subalpine.

== Behaviour ==
The adults of this species have been observed on the wing from November to January as well as in March.
