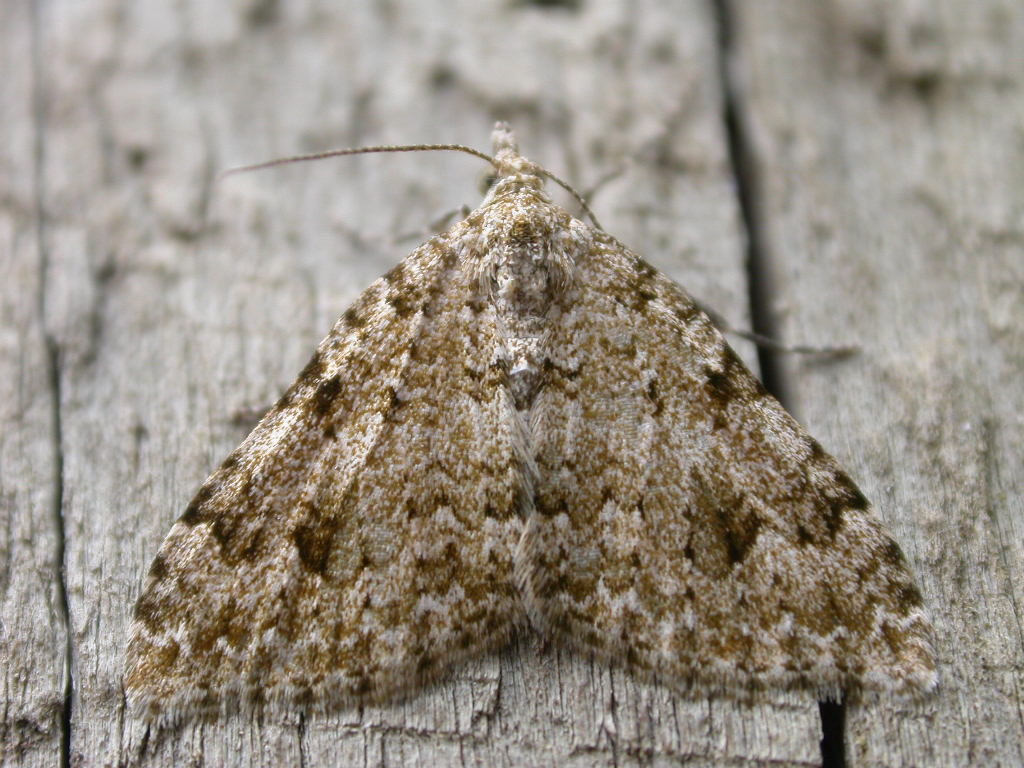

Scientific classification
- Kingdom: Animalia
- Phylum: Arthropoda
- Class: Insecta
- Order: Lepidoptera
- Family: Geometridae
- Tribe: Larentiini
- Genus: Helastia; Guenée, 1868

= Helastia =

Genus of moths

Helastia is a genus of moths in the family Geometridae erected by Achille Guenée in 1868. It is considered by some to be a synonym of Larentia. This genus was redefined and described in 1987 by Robin C. Craw. This genus is endemic to New Zealand.

== Species ==
- Helastia alba Craw, 1987
- Helastia angusta Craw, 1987
- Helastia christinae Craw, 1987
- Helastia cinerearia (Doubleday, 1843)
- Helastia clandestina (Philpott, 1921)
- Helastia corcularia (Guenée, 1868)
- Helastia cryptica Craw, 1987
- Helastia cymozeucta (Meyrick, 1913)
- Helastia expolita (Philpott, 1917)
- Helastia farinata (Warren, 1896)
- Helastia mutabilis Craw, 1987
- Helastia ohauensis Craw, 1987
- Helastia plumbea (Philpott, 1915)
- Helastia salmoni Craw, 1987
- Helastia scissa Craw, 1987
- Helastia semisignata (Walker, 1862)
- Helastia siris (Hawthorne, 1897)
- Helastia triphragma (Meyrick, 1883)
