= Helastia salmoni =

- Male holotype

Conservation status
- Data Deficit (NZ TCS)

Scientific classification
- Kingdom: Animalia
- Phylum: Arthropoda
- Clade: Pancrustacea
- Class: Insecta
- Order: Lepidoptera
- Family: Geometridae
- Genus: Helastia
- Species: H. salmoni

Binomial name
- Helastia salmoni Craw, 1987

Species of moth endemic to New Zealand

Helastia salmoni is a moth of the family Geometridae. This species is endemic to New Zealand and is found only in Fiordland in the South Island. Adults of this species are on the wing in January and are nocturnal and attracted to light. Although similar in appearance to Helastia corcularia, H. salmoni can be distinguished as its forewings are a lighter white-grey. This species was named in honour of John Salmon. In 2025 this species was classified as "data deficient" under the New Zealand Threat Classification System by the Department of Conservation.

== Taxonomy ==
This species was first described by Robin Craw in 1987 using specimens collected at the Homer Tunnel and at Gertrude in Otago. The male holotype, collected at the Homer Tunnel in January by John T. Salmon, is held at Te Papa. This species is named in John Salmon's honour.

== Description ==
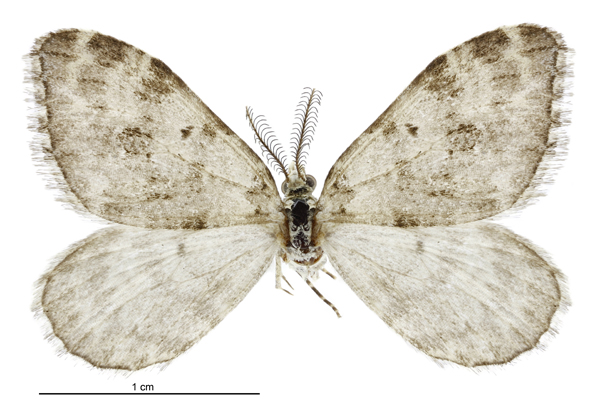
H. salmoni male

Craw described this species as follows:

Medium sized (r.f.l. 12.7-13.2 mm) triangular forewing. Upperside forewing whitish-grey with wavy brown transverse lines. Male antennae bipectinated.

Craw went on to explain that this species can be distinguished from Helastia corcularia as H. salmoni has forewings the upper side of which is coloured white-grey whereas H. corcularia has a darker more slate grey colour.

== Distribution ==
This species is endemic to New Zealand. It is only found in Fiordland in the South Island.

== Behaviour ==
Adults of this species are on the wing in January. They are nocturnal and are attracted to light.

== Habitat and hosts ==
This species inhabits subalpine terrain. Although the life history of this species is poorly known, the larval host plants of this species are likely mosses or herbs or possibly lichens.

== Conservation status ==
In 2025 this species was classified by the New Zealand Department of Conservation as "data deficient" under the New Zealand Threat Classification System as a result of the difficulty in identifying the species.
