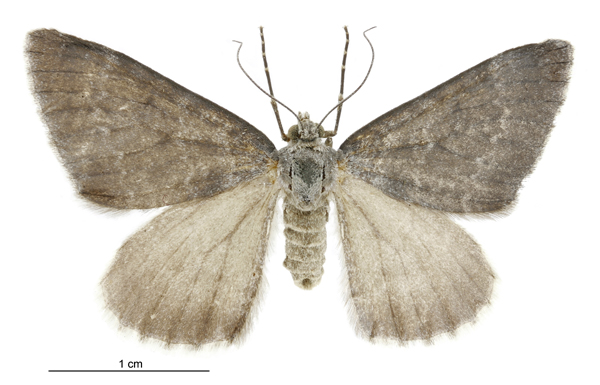
- Female
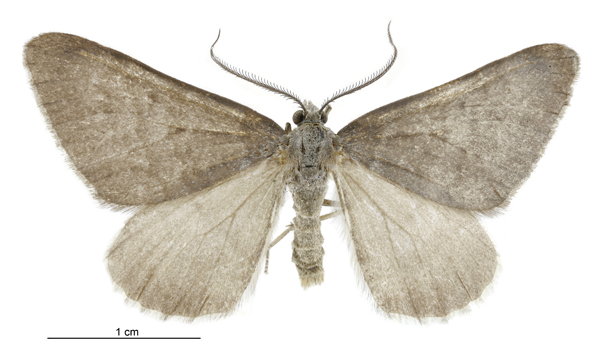
- Male

Conservation status
- Data Deficit (NZ TCS)

Scientific classification
- Kingdom: Animalia
- Phylum: Arthropoda
- Clade: Pancrustacea
- Class: Insecta
- Order: Lepidoptera
- Family: Geometridae
- Genus: Helastia
- Species: H. clandestina

Binomial name
- Helastia clandestina (Philpott, 1921)

Synonyms
- Xanthorhoe clandestina Philpott, 1921

= Helastia clandestina =

Species of moth endemic to New Zealand

Helastia clandestina is a moth of the family Geometridae. This species is endemic to New Zealand and is found only in the South Island in and around Arthur's Pass. Adults have been collected on the wing in February and are nocturnal. Its preferred habitat is dry stony riverbeds and flood plains. The glossy blueish grey colouration of the adults of this species helps camouflage them against the rocks in their preferred habitat. In 2025 this species was classified as "data deficient" under the New Zealand Threat Classification System.

== Taxonomy ==
This species was first described by Alfred Philpott in 1921 using a specimen collected by E. S. Gourlay at Arthur's Pass and named Xanthorhoe clandestina. George Hudson discussed and illustrated this species in his 1928 book The Butterflies and Moths of New Zealand under the same name. In 1987, Robin C. Craw placed this species within the genus Helastia. The holotype specimen is held at the Canterbury Museum.

== Description ==
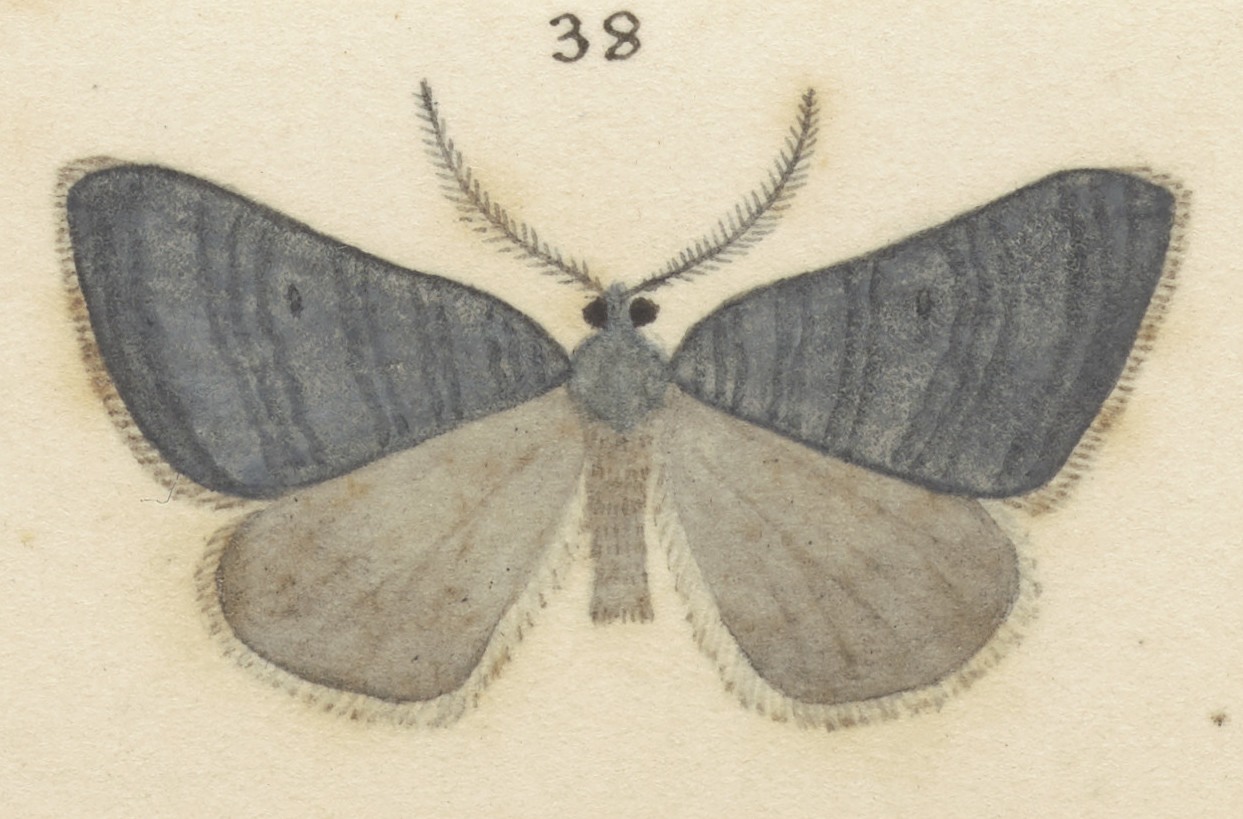
Illustration by George Hudson.

Philpott described the species as follows:

♂︎. 35 mm. Head and palpi grey-whitish. Eyes olive-brown. Antennae dark grey, pectinations 5 but appearing shorter owing to being basally appressed to the shaft. Thorax grey. Abdomen whitish-grey. Fore-wings elongate-triangular, costa sinuate, apex bluntly pointed, termen straight, oblique; bluish-grey; lines faintly indicated in darker; an irregular basal line at 1/6; first line at 1/3, double, slightly waved; discal spot rather elongate, transverse, dark; a fairly straight, slightly waved, median line; second line from 2/3 costa to 3/4 dorsum, excurved on upper half, faintly margined with white on veins : cilia white, basally mixed with grey. Hindwings grey, slightly darker round termen : cilia white.

The glossy blueish grey colouration of the adults of this species helps camouflage them against rocks.

== Distribution ==
This species is endemic to New Zealand. It occurs in Westland, North Canterbury and Mid Canterbury.

== Biology and lifecycle ==
Very little is known about the biology of H. clandestina. Hudson records it being on the wing in February. Adult moths are nocturnal and are drawn to light.

== Host species and habitat ==
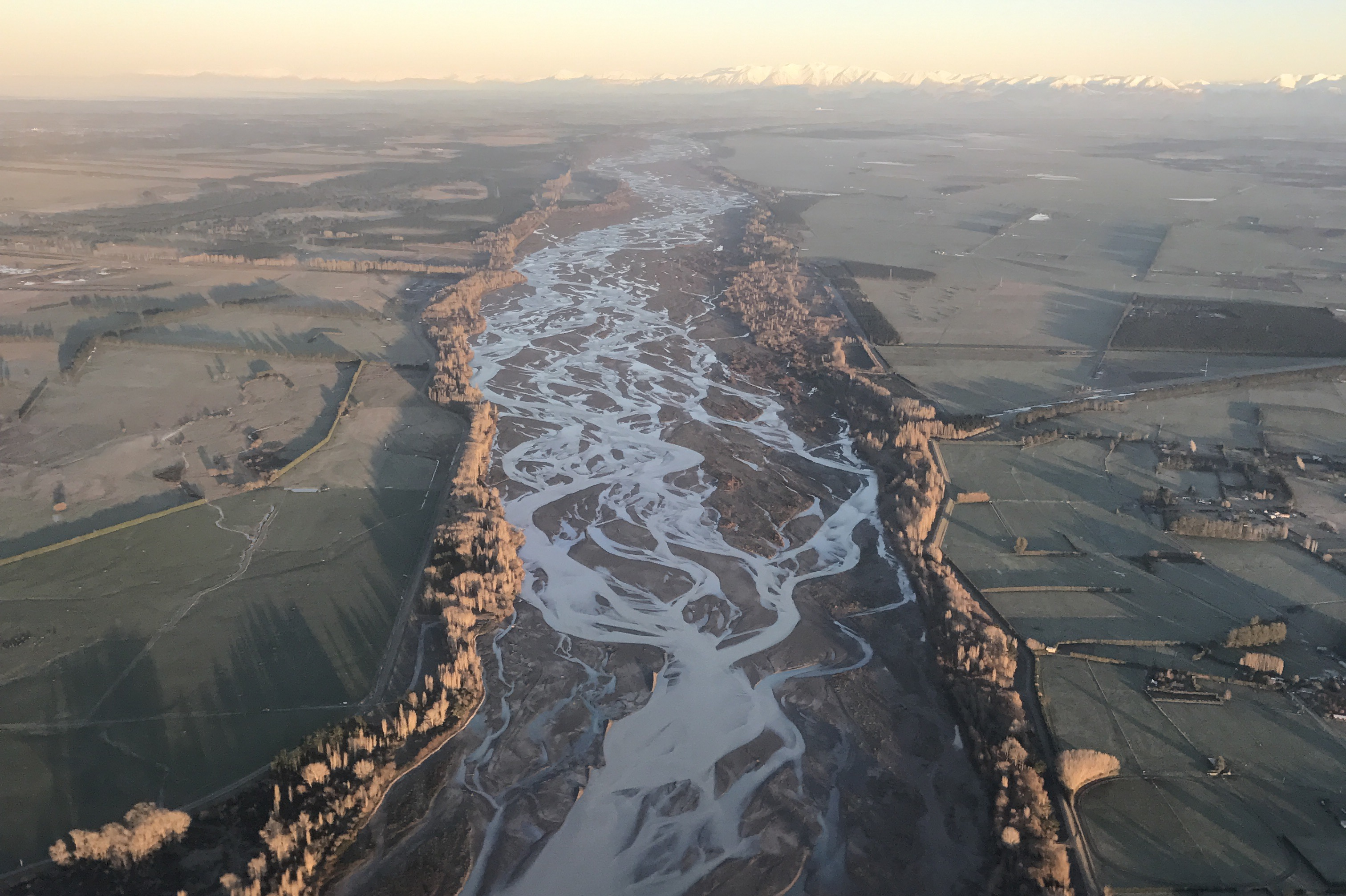
Waimakariri River

The host species for the larvae of H. clandestina is unknown. H. clandestina prefers stony riverbed habitat such as at the Waimakariri River flood plain.

== Conservation status ==
In 2025 this species was classified by the New Zealand Department of Conservation as "data deficient" under the New Zealand Threat Classification System. This species is regarded as being relict and range restricted.
