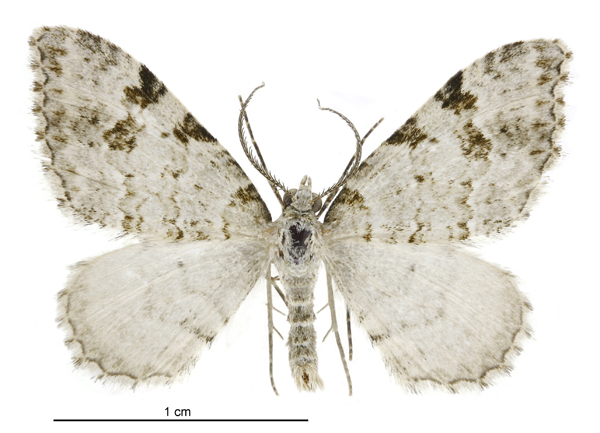
- Male

Scientific classification
- Kingdom: Animalia
- Phylum: Arthropoda
- Class: Insecta
- Order: Lepidoptera
- Family: Geometridae
- Genus: Helastia
- Species: H. alba

Binomial name
- Helastia alba Craw, 1987

= Helastia alba =

Species of moth endemic to New Zealand

Helastia alba is a moth of the family Geometridae. This species is endemic to New Zealand and is found only in the South Island. This species inhabits native forest or scrubland and can be observed in montane to subalpine Nothofagus dominant forests. It has also been observed at lower altitudes in native podocarp forests. Larvae of this species have been raised on mosses. Adults are on the wing from November to January and are nocturnal. This species is very similar in appearance to other species in the genus Helastia, but specimens can be distinguished by the dissection of their genitalia.

== Taxonomy ==
This species was first described by Robin C. Craw in 1987. The male holotype, collected by Merlin Owen Pascoe in Queenstown, is held in the New Zealand Arthropod Collection.

== Description ==
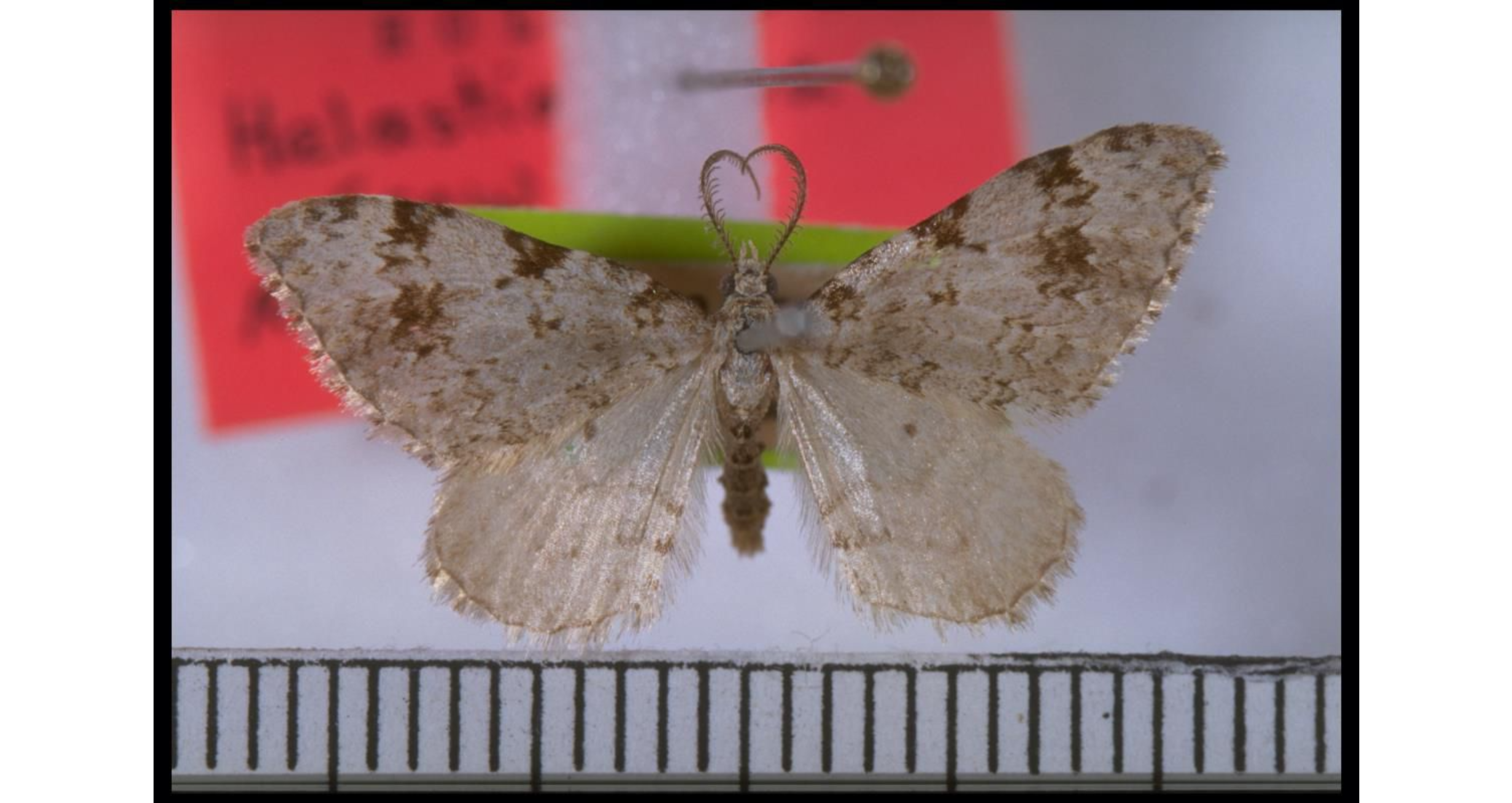
Male holotype of Helastia alba.

Craw described this species as follows:

Small to medium sized (r.f.l. 9-12.5mm) triangular forewing. Upper side forewing coloration and pattern dull whitish to whitish grey with dark brown to brown-ish ochreous wavy transverse lines. Male antennae bipectinated.

== Distribution ==
This species is endemic to New Zealand. This species is found only in the South Island and has been observed in the following regions: Nelson, Buller, North Canterbury, Mid Canterbury, Mackenzie, Otago Lakes, Fiordland and Southland. In the Otago Lakes region it is regarded as being widespread but local in occurrence.

Species within the genus Helastia are very similar in appearance and as such can be difficult to identify. H. alba has frequently been confused with H. cinerearia or with H. mutabilis. However all these species can be distinguished from one another by the dissection of the genitalia of the specimen.

== Habitat and hosts ==
This species inhabits the edge of native forest or shrubland. It lives in Nothofagus forests at altitudes ranging from montane to sub-alpine. It has also been observed in native podocarp forests at lower altitudes. Larvae have been raised on mosses.

== Behaviour ==
Adults are on the wing from November to January. They are nocturnal and are attracted to light.
