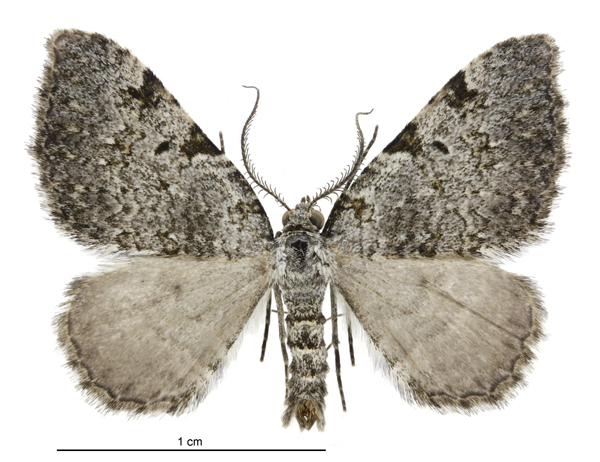
- Male
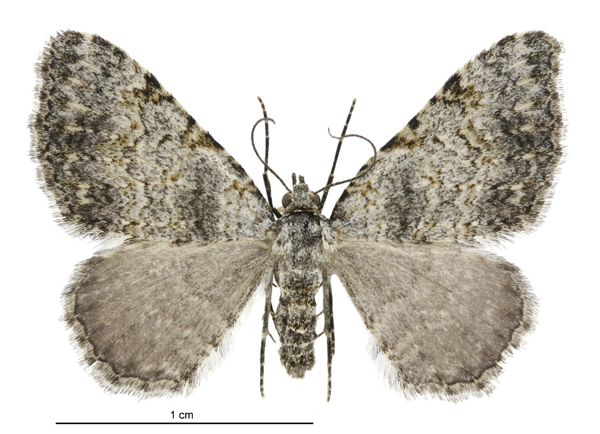
- Female

Scientific classification
- Domain: Eukaryota
- Kingdom: Animalia
- Phylum: Arthropoda
- Class: Insecta
- Order: Lepidoptera
- Family: Geometridae
- Genus: Helastia
- Species: H. mutabilis

Binomial name
- Helastia mutabilis Craw, 1987

= Helastia mutabilis =

Species of moth

Helastia mutabilis is a species of moth of the family Geometridae. It is endemic to New Zealand, where it is known from both the North and South Islands. It inhabits native forest at lower altitudes and its larval host are moss species in the genus Racomitrium. This species is nocturnal and is attracted to light. It can easily be confused with the similar in appearance species Helastia alba and Helastia cinerearia.

== Taxonomy ==
This species was first described by Robin C. Craw in 1987 using specimens collected in Riwaka by Alfred Philpott. The male holotype is held in the New Zealand Arthropod Collection.

== Description ==
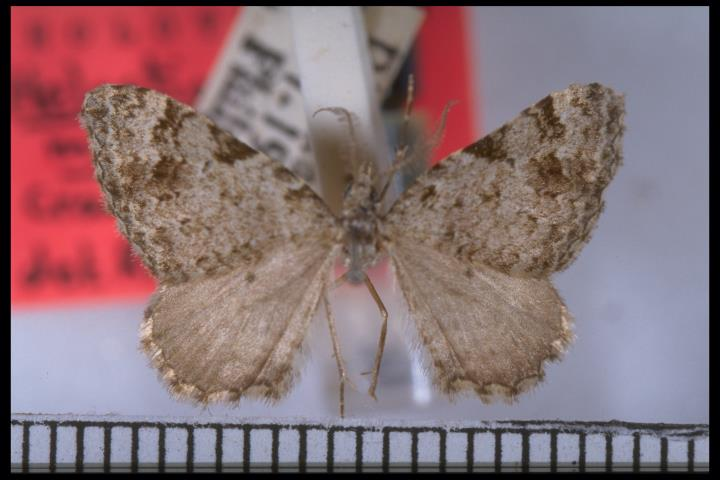
Male holotype of H. mutabilis

This species was described by Craw as follows:

Small to medium sized (9.5-13.1 mm) triangular forewing. Upperside forewing colouration brownish white to grey with brown to dark brown wavy transverse lines. Male antennae bipectinated.

This species is similar in appearance to and can be easily confused with H. alba and H. cinerearia. The most reliable way to distinguish between these species is via the examination of their genitalia.

== Distribution ==
H. mutabilis is endemic to New Zealand. It can be found in both the North and South Islands.

== Behaviour ==
This species is nocturnal and is attracted to light.

== Habitat and hosts ==
H. mutabilis is associated with lower altitude forests of Nothofagus and podocarp species. The larvae of this species have been observed in November feeding on moss species of the genus Racomitrium.
