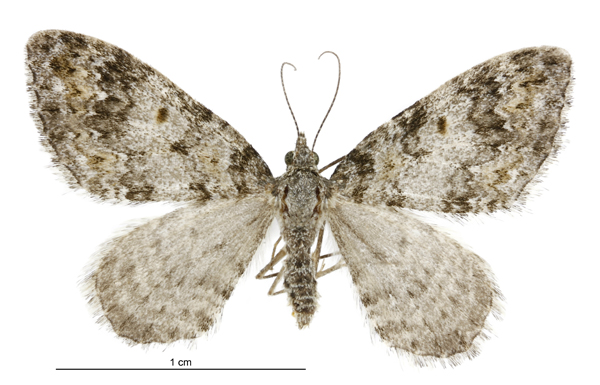
- Female
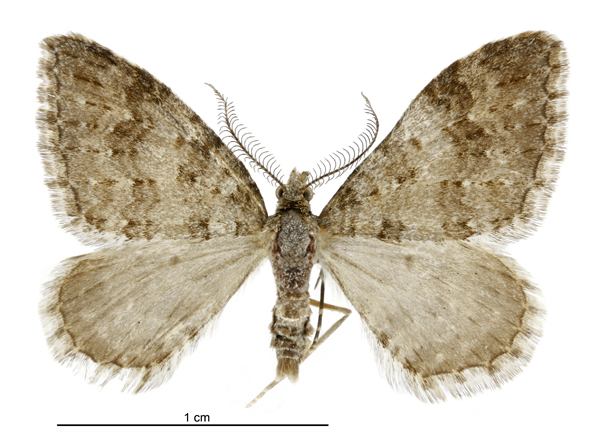
- Male

Scientific classification
- Domain: Eukaryota
- Kingdom: Animalia
- Phylum: Arthropoda
- Class: Insecta
- Order: Lepidoptera
- Family: Geometridae
- Genus: Helastia
- Species: H. plumbea

Binomial name
- Helastia plumbea (Philpott, 1915)

Synonyms
- Xanthorhoe plumbea Philpott, 1915

= Helastia plumbea =

Species of moth endemic to New Zealand

Helastia plumbea is a moth of the family Geometridae. This species is endemic to New Zealand and is found in both the North and South Islands. The species inhabits stream and river banks in montane to subalpine terrain. Adults are on the wing from October to April and are nocturnal and attracted to light. The life history of this species is, at 2024, poorly known but the larval host plants are likely mosses, herbs or possibly lichens.

== Taxonomy ==
This species was first described by Alfred Philpott in 1915 using four specimens collected in Queenstown in November and was originally named Xanthorhoe plumbea. George Hudson discussed this species under that name in his book The Butterflies and Moths of New Zealand. Philpott illustrated the male genitalia of this species in 1928. L. B. Prout, in 1939, discussed this species as a synonym of Xanthorhoe infantaria. In 1971 J. S. Dugdale placed this species in the genus Helastia. In 1987 R. C. Craw discussed this species while revising the genus Helastia. The male holotype is held at the New Zealand Arthropod Collection.

== Description ==
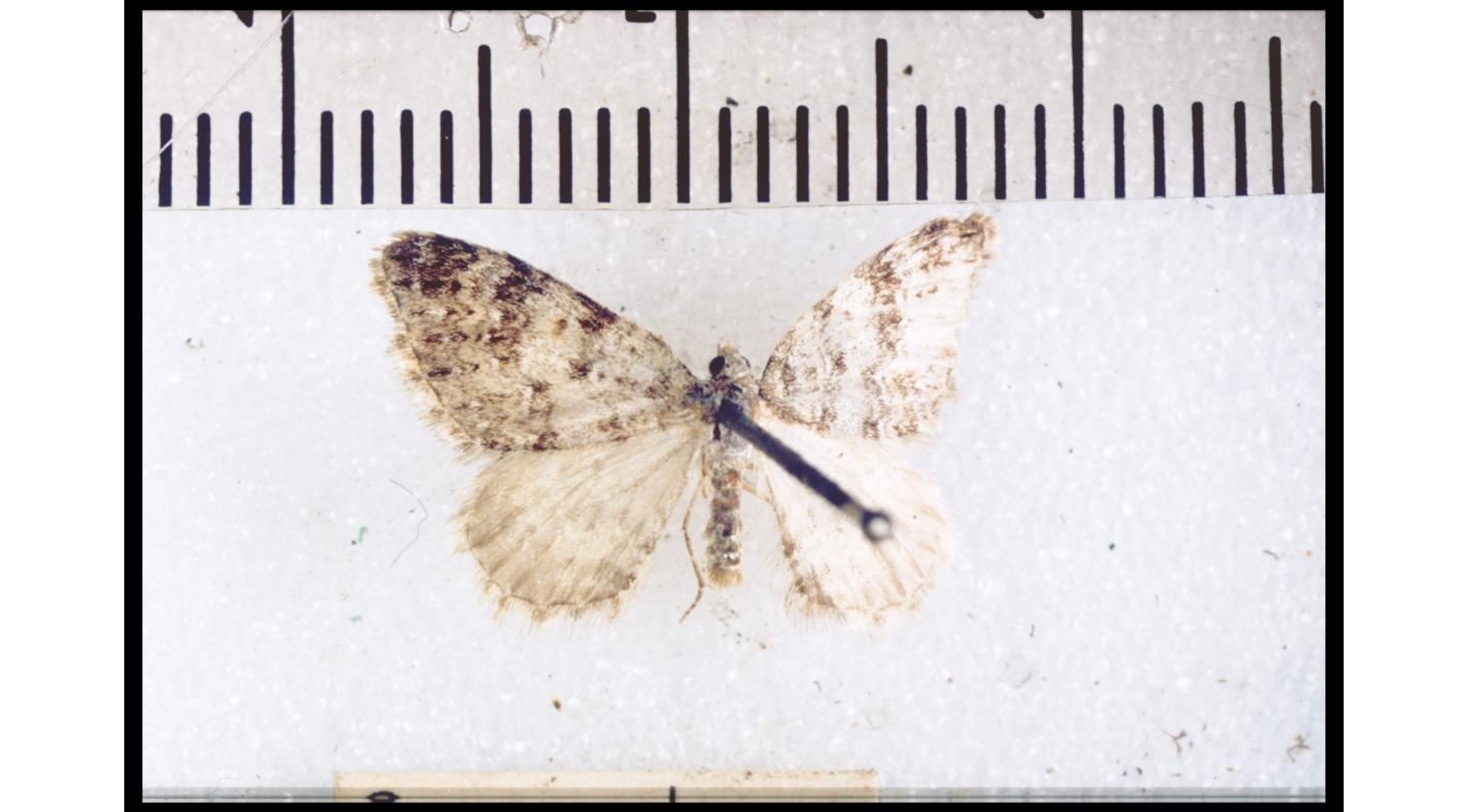
Male holotype specimen for Xanthorhoe plumbea, now known as Helastia plumbea.

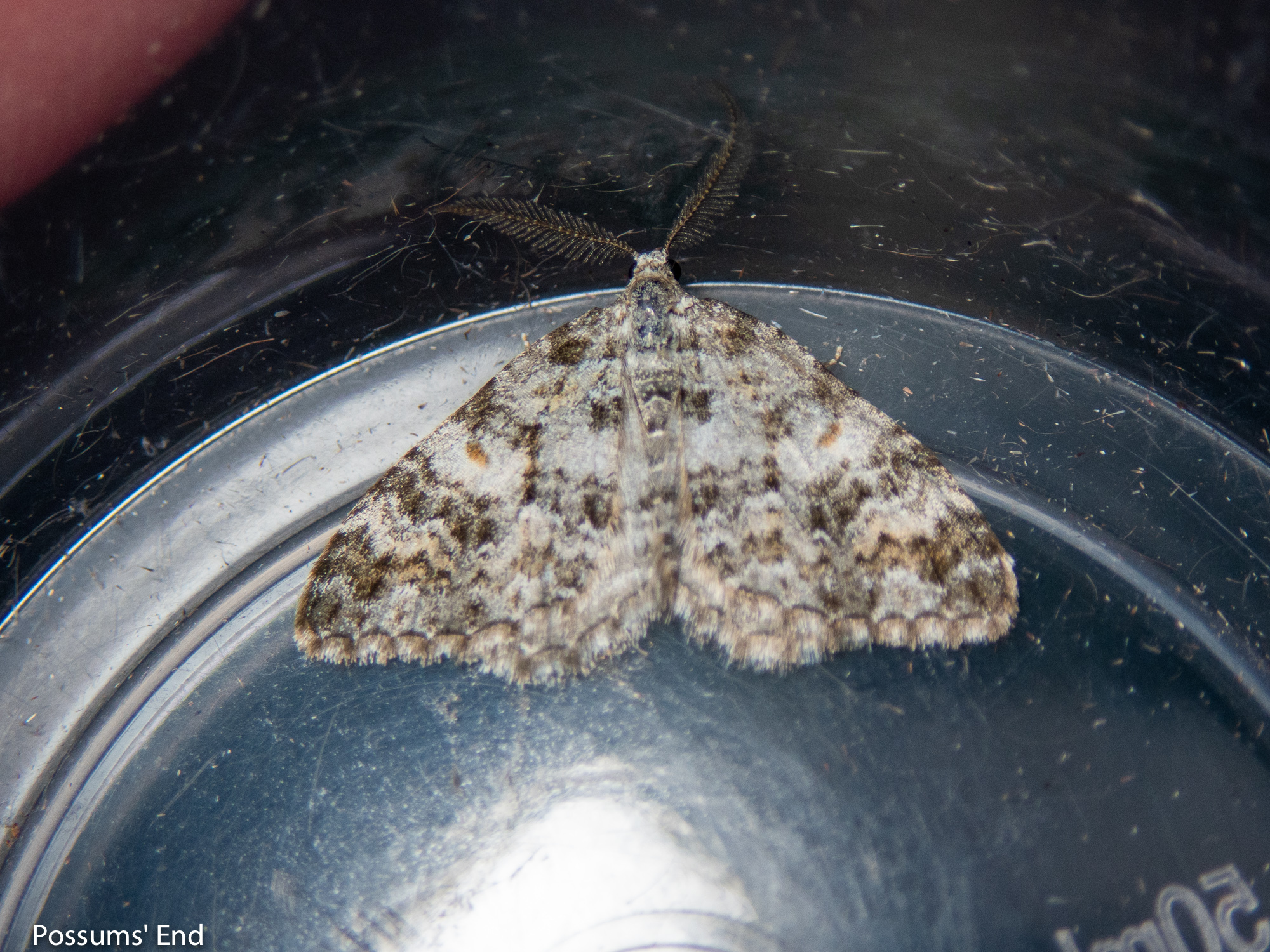
Living male specimen of Helastia plumbea.

This species was originally described by Philpott as follows:

♂ 18–20 mm. Head, palpi, and thorax grey mixed with black. Antennae fuscous, pectinations moderate. Abdomen grey, each segment bearing dorsally a pair of cuneate black marks. Forewings rather elongate, costa sinuate, moderately arched, apex subacute, termen almost straight, oblique; bluish-grey with some reddish-ochreous on veins and posterior to second line; lines formed of bluish-grey irregular paired striae; basal line obscure, curved; first line rather angulated at middle, margined anteriorly with white, angle marked with reddish-ochreous; a rather prominent spot of reddish-ochreous between basal and first lines at middle; a suffused reddish-ochreous discal spot; second line irregularly curved, its outer margin marked by a series of white points which are sometimes more or less connected by a thin white line; an obscure reddish-ochreous subterminal line; veins beyond second line marked with blackish interrupted by some white dots; an obscure black waved line round termen: cilia white, mixed with grey and with obscure darker bars. Hindwings rather elongate, termen strongly rounded; fuscous-grey; discal dot and some striae on terminal portion obscurely indicated; an obscure waved black line round termen: cilia white, mixed with grey and with suffused darker bars.

This species can be distinguished from its sister species as a result of the blueish grey colour of the underside of the forewing as well as the reddish-ochreous discal spot on the upperside of the forewing.

== Distribution ==
H. plumbea is endemic to New Zealand and is found in the North and South Islands. In the North Island it is recorded in the Taupo region; in the South Island it is found in the Nelson, Buller, Marlborough, North Canterbury, Westland, Mackenzie, Dunedin, Central Otago, Otago Lakes and Fiordland areas.

== Habitat and hosts ==
This species inhabits stream and river banks in montane to subalpine terrain. Although the life history of this species is poorly known, the larval host plants of this species are likely mosses or herbs or possibly lichens.

== Behaviour ==
Adults of this species have been observed on the wing from October to April. They are nocturnal and are attracted to light.
