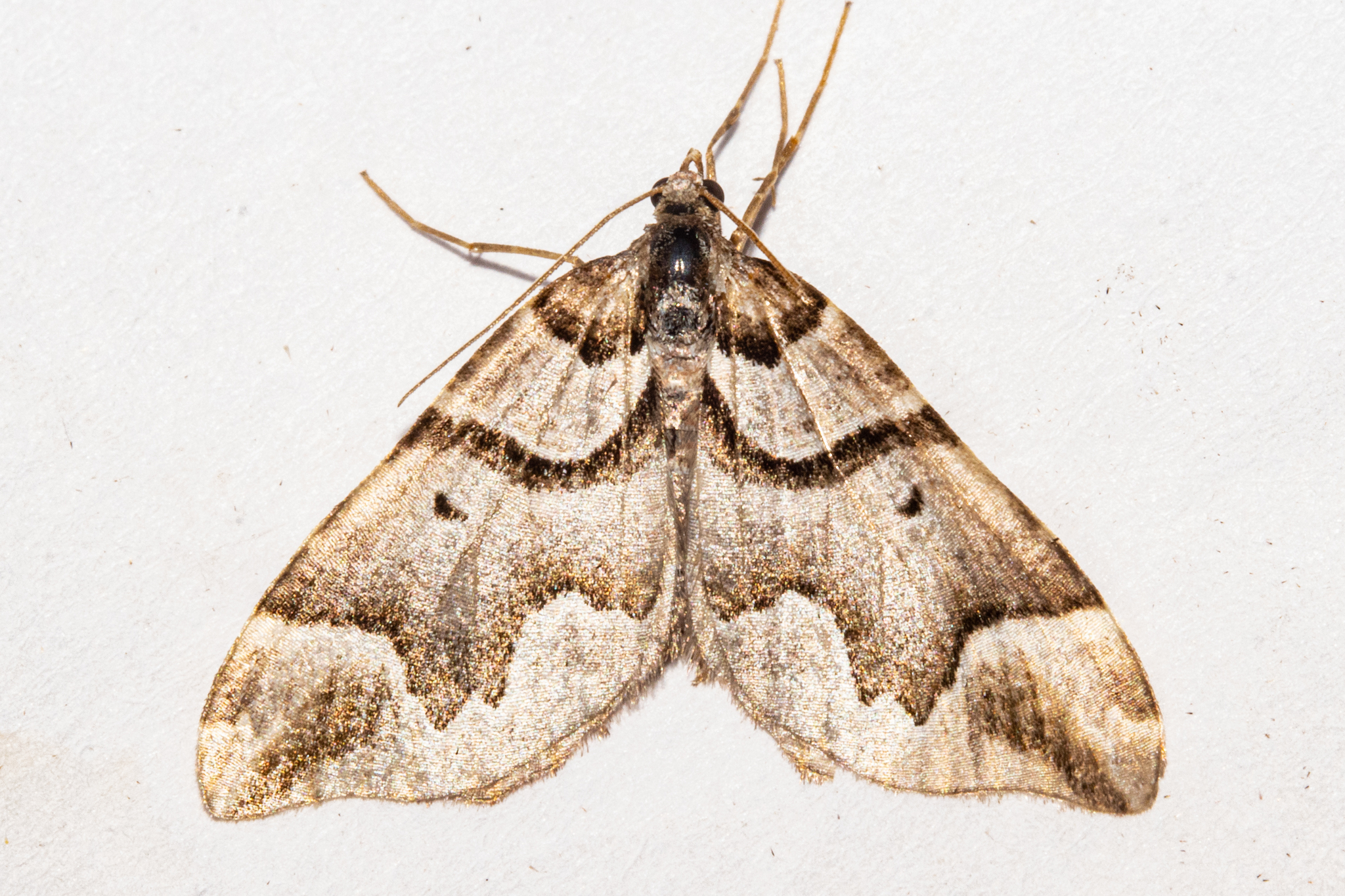

Conservation status
- Relict (NZ TCS)

Scientific classification
- Kingdom: Animalia
- Phylum: Arthropoda
- Class: Insecta
- Order: Lepidoptera
- Family: Geometridae
- Genus: Helastia
- Species: H. expolita

Binomial name
- Helastia expolita (Philpott, 1917)

Synonyms
- Hydriomena expolita Philpott, 1917; Euphyia expolita (Philpott, 1917)

= Helastia expolita =

Species of moth endemic to New Zealand

Helastia expolita is a species of moth in the family Geometridae. This species is endemic to New Zealand and occurs in the Buller, Marlborough, North and Mid Canterbury regions.This species inhabits short tussock grassland in montane to subalpine zones. Adult moths are nocturnal but little is known about the life history of H. expolita. Adults have been observed on the wing in November. It has been hypothesised the larvae of H. expolita feed on the flowers of Helichrysum species and then feed on mosses, lichens or shrubs growing nearby. It is classified as "At Risk, Relict'" by the Department of Conservation.

== Taxonomy ==
This species was first described by Alfred Philpott in 1917 using a specimen collected by J.H. Lewis at Broken River, Canterbury and named Hydriomena expolita. George Hudson discussed and illustrated this species in his 1928 book The Butterflies and Moths of New Zealand under the same name. Louis Beethoven Prout in 1939 placed this species in the genus Euphyia. In 1987 Robin C. Craw placed this species within the genus Helastia. The holotype specimen is held at the New Zealand Arthropod Collection.

== Description ==
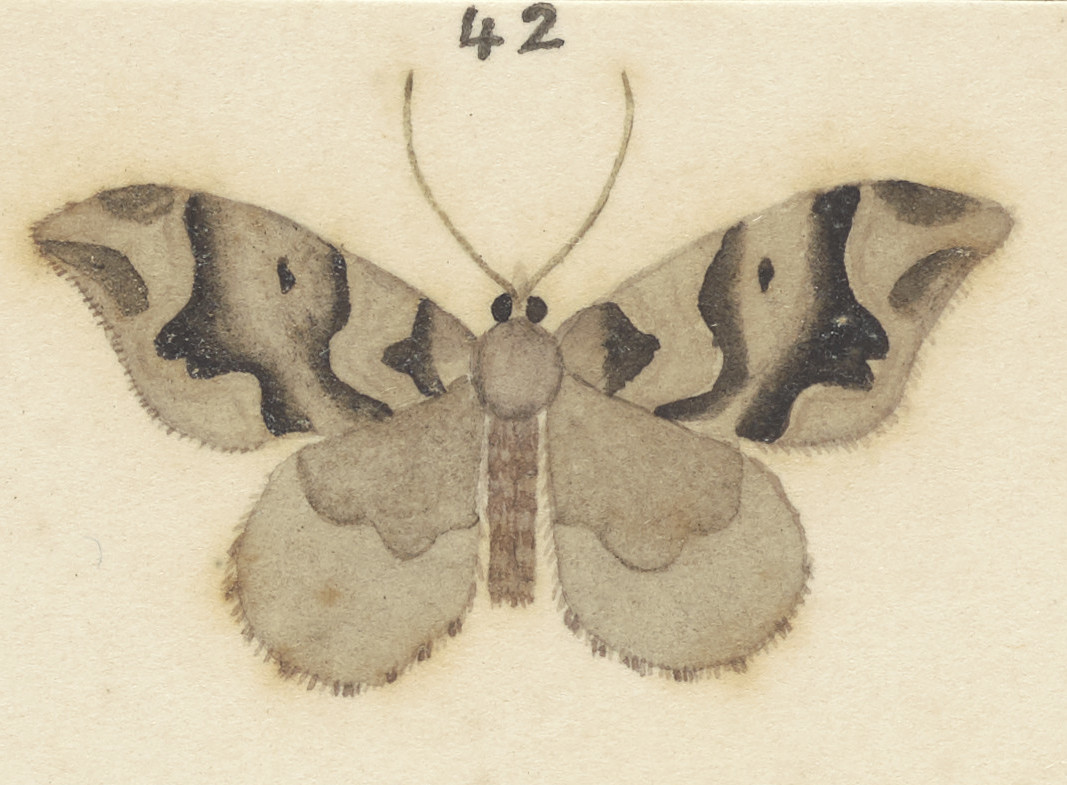
Illustration of H. expolita.

Philpott described the species as follows:

♂︎. 30 mm. Head, palpi, and antennae purplish-grey. Thorax fuscous-brown mixed with grey. Abdomen fuscous-grey with some reddish scales laterally. Forewings moderate, triangular, costa moderately arched, apex subacute, termen sinuate, oblique; whitish-grey with faint purplish tinge; markings dark purplish-fuscous; basal line thick, evenly curved, projecting angularly at middle; anterior margin of median band inwardly oblique beneath costa at 1/3, thence broadly excurved to dorsum at 1/4; posterior margin from 2/3 costa to 3/4 dorsum, with strong broad apically-indented projection at middle; traces of a thin waved white subterminal line; an oblique suffused purplish-fuscous fascia from apex : cilia grey, obscurely barred with fuscous, tips whitish. Hindwings elongate, termen angularly projecting at middle; purplish-grey; basal half darker, being marked off by a median fascia parallel to termen : cilia as in forewings. Undersides : Forewings ochreous-reddish with the upper markings faintly reproduced; hindwings ochreous-reddish, terminal half suffused with whitish.

== Distribution ==
This species is endemic to New Zealand. It occurs in Buller, Marlborough, North Canterbury and Mid Canterbury.

== Biology and lifecycle ==
Very little is known about the biology of H. expolita. Adults are nocturnal and have been collected when on the wing in November.

== Host species and habitat ==
This species prefers short tussock grassland habitat in montane to subalpine zones. The host species for the larvae of H. expolita is unknown. It has been hypothesised the larvae of H. expolita feed on the flowers of Helichrysum species and then feed on mosses, lichens or shrubs growing nearby.

== Conservation status ==
This moth is classified under the New Zealand Threat Classification system as being "At Risk, Relict". The decline in the area and quality of this species habitat is one of the factors putting this species at risk.
