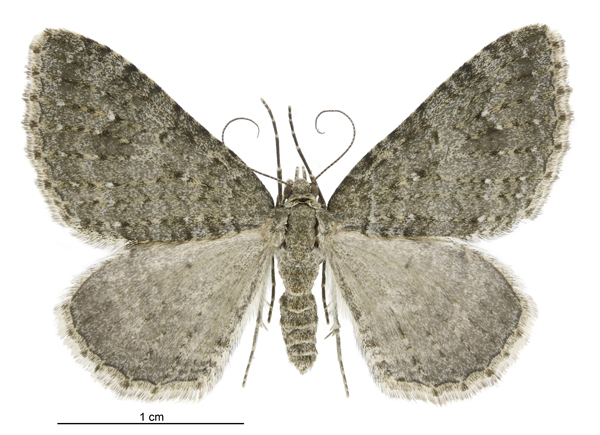
- Female
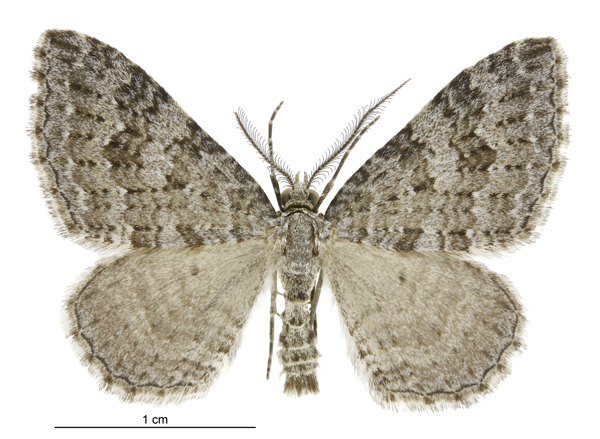
- Male

Scientific classification
- Kingdom: Animalia
- Phylum: Arthropoda
- Clade: Pancrustacea
- Class: Insecta
- Order: Lepidoptera
- Family: Geometridae
- Genus: Helastia
- Species: H. corcularia

Binomial name
- Helastia corcularia (Guenée, 1868)

Synonyms
- Larentia corcularia Guenée, 1868; Xanthorhoe corcularia (Guenée, 1868); Larentia infantaria Guenée, 1868; Xanthorhoe infantaria (Guenée, 1868)

= Helastia corcularia =

Species of moth endemic to New Zealand

Helastia corcularia is a moth of the family Geometridae. This species is endemic to New Zealand and is found only in the South Island and the Chatham Islands. It inhabits a wide variety of habitats including native forest and scrubland, gardens, parks, subalpine and coastal areas. Larvae feed on herbs, lichen and moss. The adults of the species are on the wing from September until May and are nocturnal and attracted to light. H. corcularia is considered an orchard and pack house contaminant.

== Taxonomy ==
This species was first described by Achille Guenée in 1868 using a specimen collected in Christchurch by Richard William Fereday and named Larentia corcularia. In the same publication and thinking he was describing another new species, Guenée also named this species Larentia infantaria. Robin C. Craw when revising this species in 1987 synonymised L. infantaria with L. corcularia. In 1877 Arthur Gardiner Butler synonymised H. corcularia with the species H. semisignata. This was followed by subsequent authors, including George Hudson in his 1928 publication, until Craw pointed out that the genitalia of both male and female specimens of H. corcularia were distinctly differently shaped from H. semisignata. The male holotype specimen is held at the Natural History Museum, London.

== Description ==
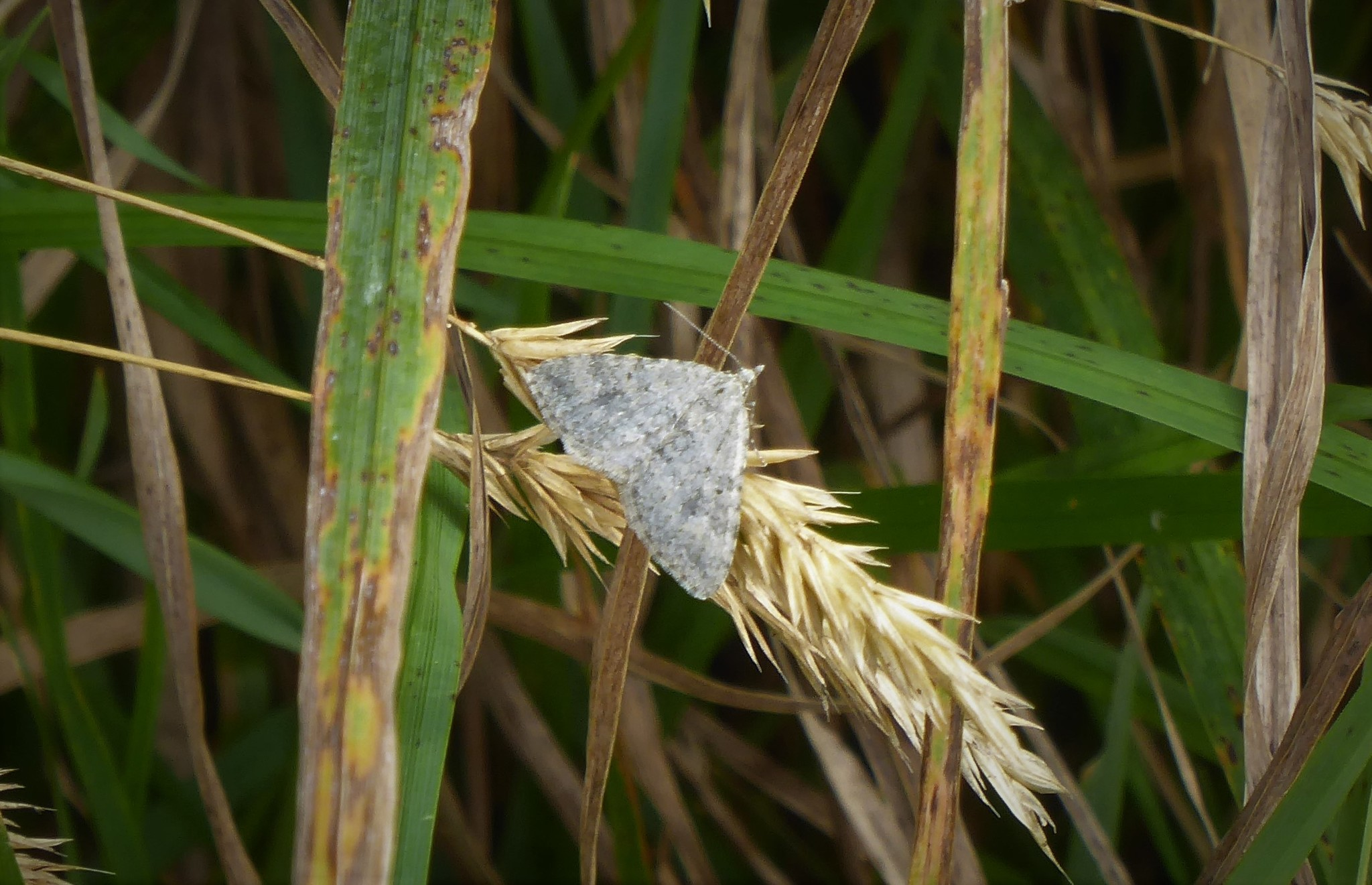
Observation of female H. corcularia.

Guenée described this species as follows:

It has some relationship with our salicata, of which it has scarcely the size, but almost the colour. One sees in it almost the same lines, which are equally denticulated and badly marked; the two median are better marked, or rather it should be said that the space they limit tends to become darker in their vicinity; small, very fine white dots follow the elbow hne, and others indicate the subterminal; the fringe is lightly sinuated with blackish : inferior wings slightly paler, with the line a little distinct; beneath they are whitish-grey, with the same punctiform lines. Palpi forming a sort of beak almost as long as the head. Antennae furnished with long and very fine pectinations. The ♀ resembles the ♂, but the antennae are filiform.

This species is distinguishable from H. semisignata as it is a slightly larger moth and there are distinct differences when the genitalia of a specimen is examined. H. semisignata can only be found in the North Island.

== Distribution ==
H. corcularia is endemic to New Zealand and is found throughout the South Island as well as in the Chatham Islands.

== Habitat and hosts ==
This species inhabits a wide variety of habitats including native forest, scrubland, gardens, parks, coastal areas and subalpine herbfields. Larvae have been observed feeding on lichens and herbs. Larvae are also said to feed on moss.

== Behaviour ==
The adults are on the wing from September until May. They are nocturnal and are attracted to light. They have been collected via a mercury vapour light trap.

== Interactions with humans ==
This species is regarded as an orchard and pack house contaminant.
