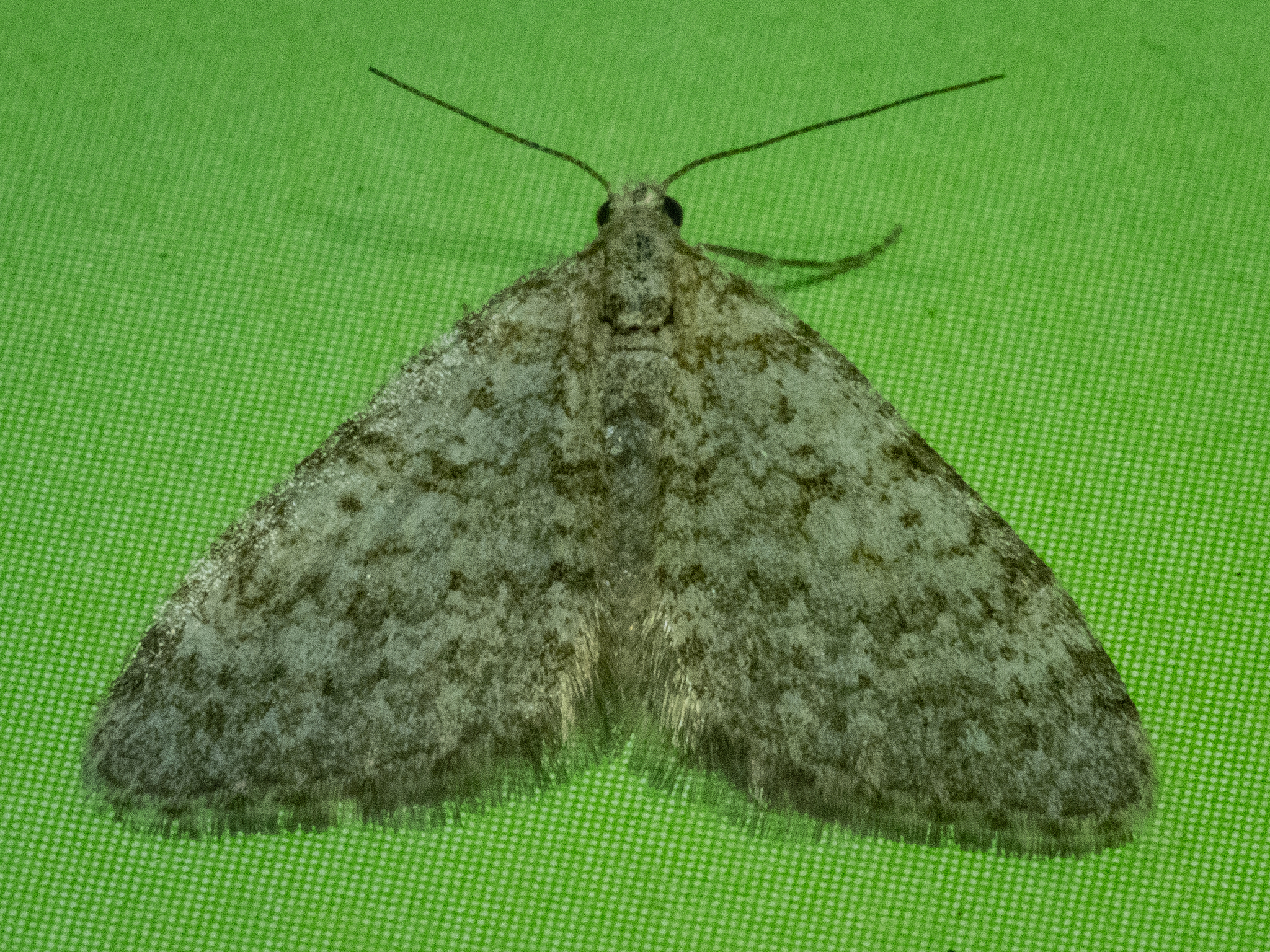

Scientific classification
- Domain: Eukaryota
- Kingdom: Animalia
- Phylum: Arthropoda
- Class: Insecta
- Order: Lepidoptera
- Family: Geometridae
- Genus: Helastia
- Species: H. ohauensis

Binomial name
- Helastia ohauensis Craw, 1987

= Helastia ohauensis =

Species of moth endemic to New Zealand

Helastia ohauensis is a species of moth in the family Geometridae. This species is endemic to New Zealand and can be found in the Mackenzie District in the South Island. Adults are on the wing in December and the species inhabits subalpine terrain.

== Taxonomy ==
This species was first described by Robin C. Craw in 1987 using specimens collected at the Freehold Range near Lake Ōhau at 4000 ft in December by S. Lindsay. The male holotype is held at the Canterbury Museum.

== Description ==
Craw originally described this species as follows:

Medium sized (13 mm) triangular forewing; fore- and hindwings more elongate than in H. corcularia with the forewing apex and hindwing termen more rounded than in that species. Upperside forewing coloration and pattern light slaty brownish grey with darker and lighter wavy transverse lines. Male antennae bipectinated.

== Distribution ==
H. ohauensis is endemic to New Zealand. It has been observed in the Mackenzie District of the South Island.

== Behaviour ==
Adults of this species are on the wing in December. They are nocturnal and are attracted to light.

== Habitat ==
This species inhibits subalpine terrain.
