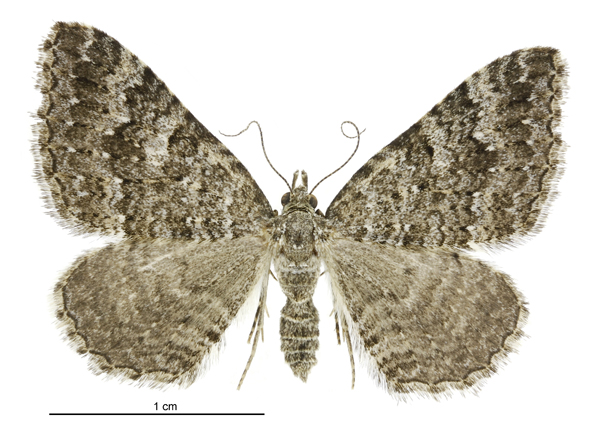
- Female
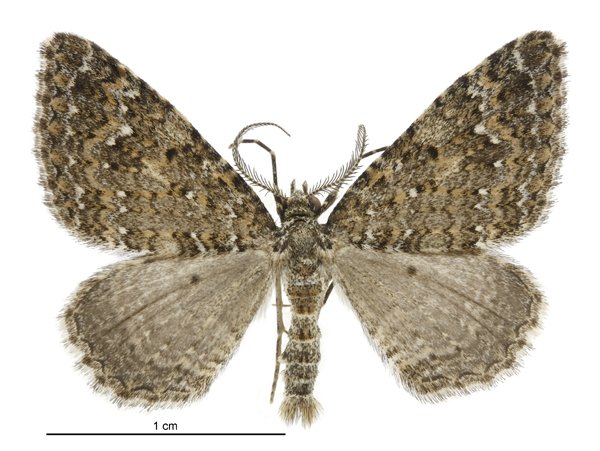
- Male

Scientific classification
- Kingdom: Animalia
- Phylum: Arthropoda
- Class: Insecta
- Order: Lepidoptera
- Family: Geometridae
- Genus: Helastia
- Species: H. semisignata

Binomial name
- Helastia semisignata (Walker, 1862)

Synonyms
- Larentia semisignata Walker, 1862; Xanthorhoe semisignata (Walker, 1862); Larentia punctilineata Walker, 1862; Cidaria dissociate Walker, 1863; Cidaria similisata Walker, 1863

= Helastia semisignata =

Species of moth endemic to New Zealand

Helastia semisignata is a moth of the family Geometridae. This species is endemic to New Zealand and is only found in the North Island. The life history of this species is in need of further investigation as sources differ about what plants host the larvae. Adults are on the wing commonly from October until March.

== Taxonomy ==
It was first described by Francis Walker in 1862 using specimens collected by A. Sinclair in Auckland and originally named Larentia semisignata. In 1877 Arthur Gardiner Butler synonymised Cidaria dissociate and Cidaria semisilata with L. semisignata. In the same publication Butler also mistakenly synonymised Larentia corcularia with L. semisignata. This taxonomic error was correct by R. C. Craw in 1987. In 1912 L. B. Prout placed this species in the genus Xanthorhoe. This placement was followed by George Hudson in his 1928 book The butterflies and moths of New Zealand. Subsequently, in 1971, J. S. Dugdale placed this species in the genus Helastia. R. C. Craw confirmed this placement in his revision of the genus in 1987. The male holotype is held at the Natural History Museum, London.

== Description ==
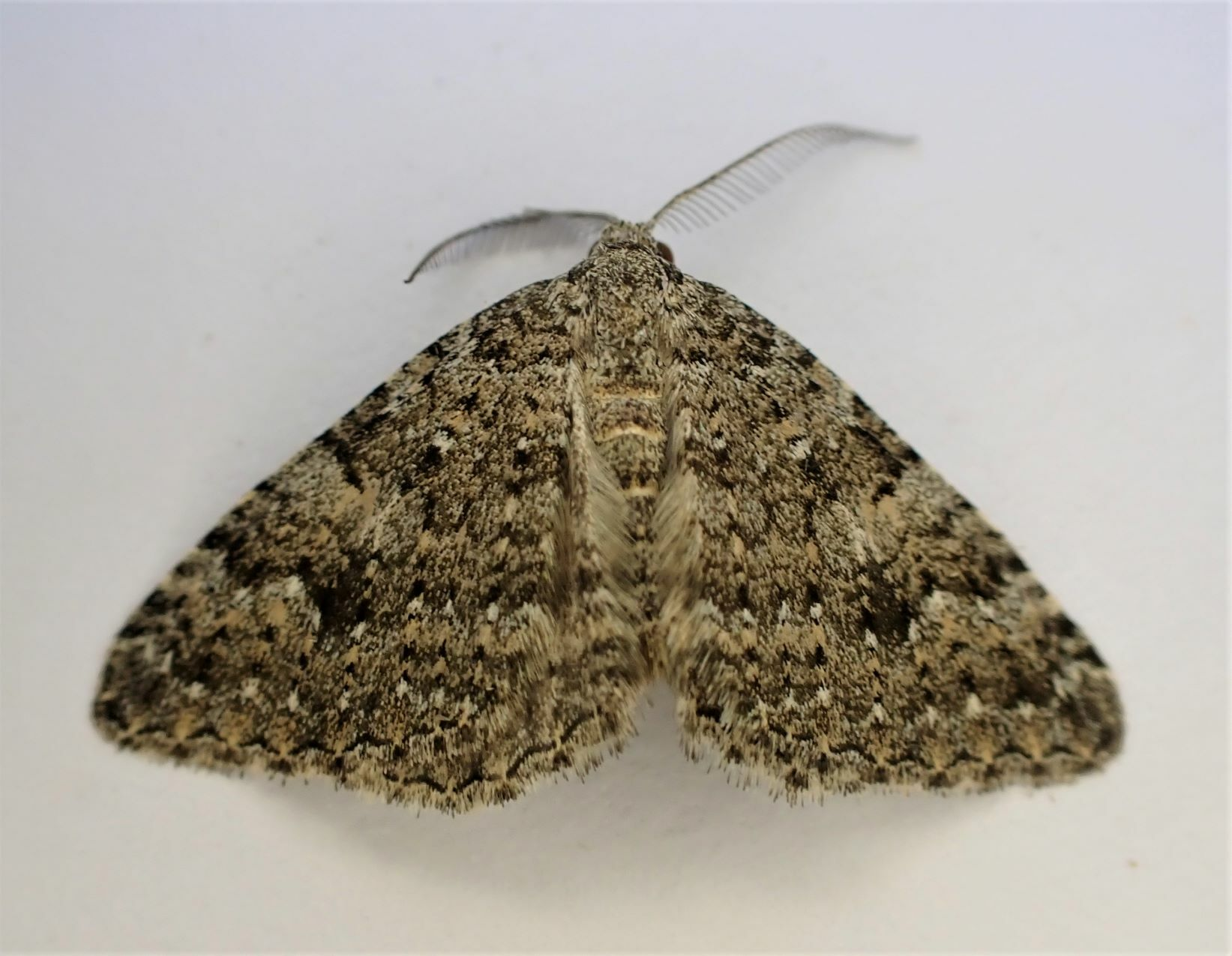
H. semisignata male

Walker described this species as follows:

Cinereous, minutely black-speckled. Head wanting. Fore wings with several denticulated blackish lines, some of which are most conspicuous on the veins, where they form black points; middle space without lines, containing the black transverse elongated discal point; interior, exterior and submarginal lines formed by whitish points on the veins; marginal lunules black; costa convex; exterior border hardly convex. Hind wings paler, with indistinct lines. Length of the body 4 lines; of the wings 12 lines.

Species in the genus Helastia can be difficult to distinguish from one another. However this species normally has orange scaling present on its forewings and its wing veins have black and white patches.

== Distribution ==
This species is endemic to New Zealand. It is found in the North Island only.

== Habitat ==
H. semisignata can be found in a variety of habitats at a variety of altitudes including native forest and scrubland, subalpine herbfields and in coastal areas. This species also inhabits developed areas such as parks and gardens.

== Behaviour ==
Adults are on the wing from most frequently from October until March and are attracted to light. They are nocturnal with adults resting on trees or stones during the day.

== Host plants ==
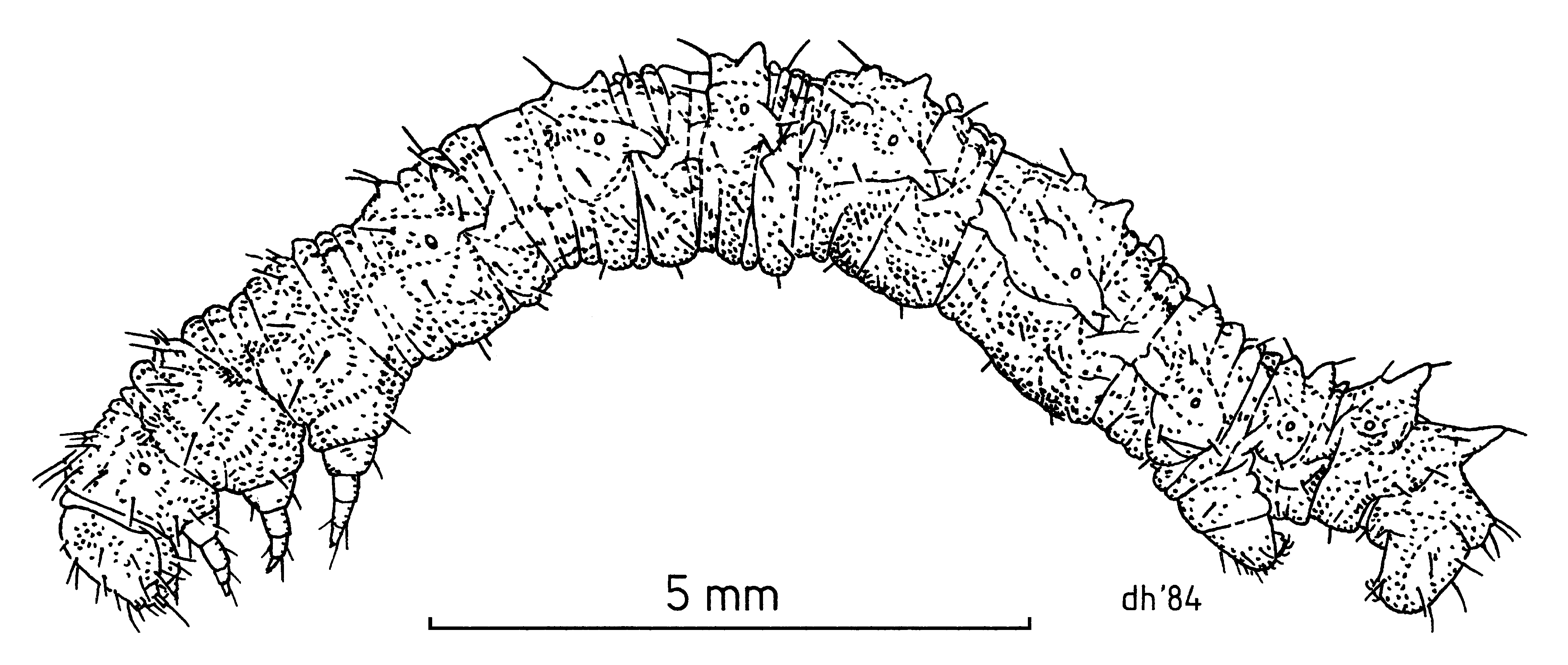
H. semisignata larva.

Larvae of this species have been raised on mosses. But other sources state that larvae have been reared on Pimelea foliage or that they feed on herbs. These inconsistencies have resulted in Robert Hoare stating that further investigations into the life history of this species is needed. The adult moths have been observed visiting and likely feeding from the flowers of Hoheria lyallii, Olearia virgata andVeronica salicifolia.
