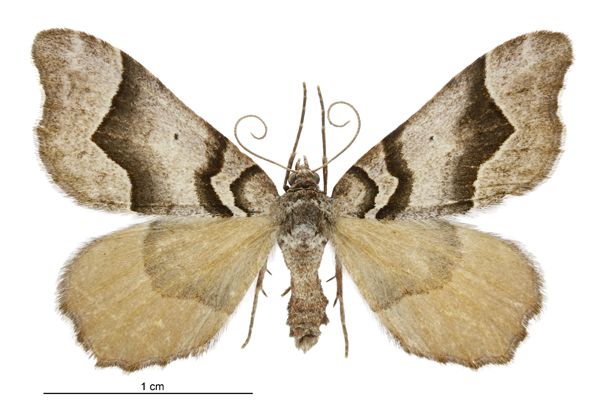
- Female
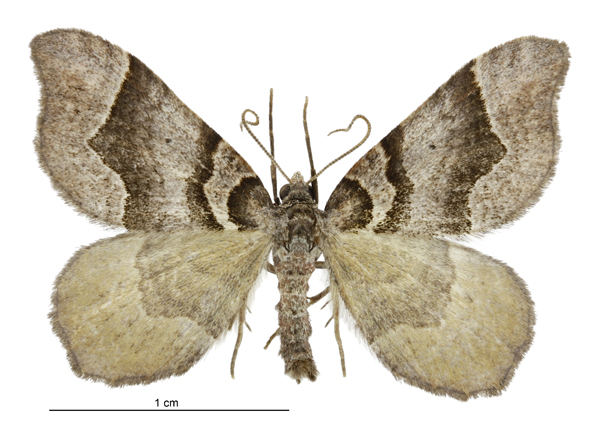
- Male

Scientific classification
- Domain: Eukaryota
- Kingdom: Animalia
- Phylum: Arthropoda
- Class: Insecta
- Order: Lepidoptera
- Family: Geometridae
- Genus: Helastia
- Species: H. triphragma

Binomial name
- Helastia triphragma (Meyrick, 1883)

Synonyms
- Cidaria triphragma Meyrick, 1883; Hydriomena triphragma (Meyrick, 1883); Euphyia triphragma (Meyrick, 1883)

= Helastia triphragma =

Species of moth endemic to New Zealand

Helastia triphragma, also known as the angle carpet moth, is a moth of the family Geometridae. It was first described by Edward Meyrick in 1883 and originally named Cidaria triphragma. This species is endemic to New Zealand and is only found in the South Island. It inhabits native scrub in coastal, lowland and montane areas. The larval host plant of this species is Helichrysum lanceolatum. Adults are nocturnal and attracted to light.

== Taxonomy ==
Edward Meyrick first described this species in 1883 using two specimens collected by Mr. Skellon in Blenheim and named it Cidaria triphragma. He gave a fuller description of this species in 1884. George Hudson discussed this species in his 1898 book under the name Hydriomena triphragma. He again used that name when discussing and illustrating this species in his book The Butterflies and Moths of New Zealand. In 1939 Louis Beethoven Prout discussed this species under the name Euphyia triphragma. Robin Craw, when revising the genus Helastia, placed this species within it in 1987. The male lectotype specimen, designated by Craw, was collected in Blenheim and is held at the Natural History Museum, London.

== Description ==
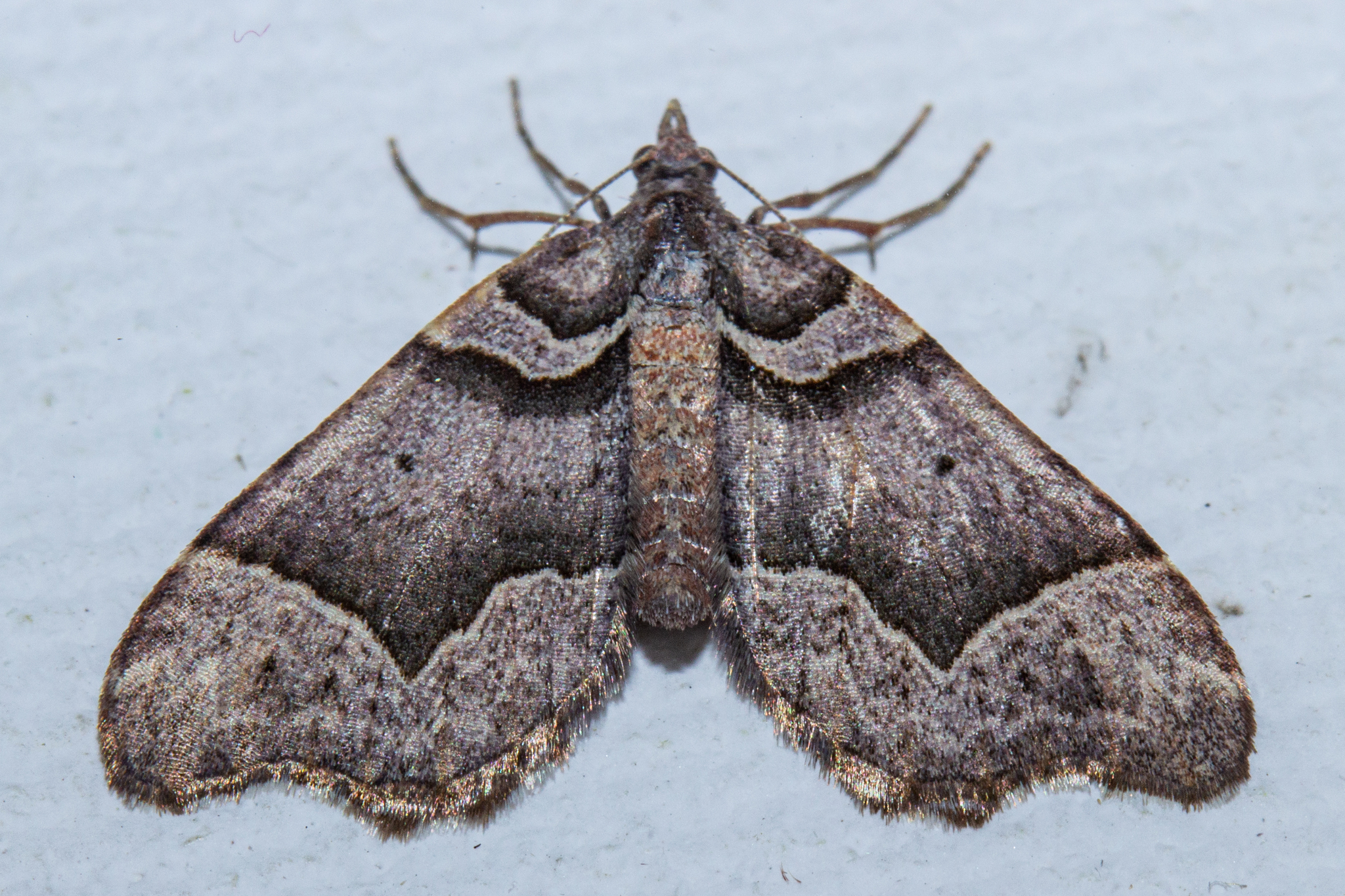
Living specimen

Meyrick described this species as follows:

Male.—26–27 mm. Forewings moderate, hindmargin strongly sinuate; pale dull greyish-purple; a very small darker basal patch, outer edge strongly convex, margined by a dark fuscous fascia, posteriorly whitish-edged; a dark fuscous fascia before ⅓, irregularly outwards-curved, posteriorly suffused, anteriorly sharply defined and whitish-edged; a minute blackish discal dot; a dark fuscous fascia beyond middle, forming a strong angle in middle, upper and lower halves both inwards-curved, anteriorly suffused, posteriorly sharply defined and whitish-edged. Hindwings moderate, hindmargin somewhat irregular, projecting in middle; whitish-ochreous mixed with pale purplish; an angulated darker band before middle.

Although similar in appearance to H. siris, H. triphragma has larger forewings which can help distinguish it from the other species.

== Distribution ==
H. triphragma is endemic to New Zealand and is only found in the South Island. It has been observed in the Marlborough, Canterbury, Dunedin, Central Otago and Otago Lakes regions.

== Habitat and hosts ==
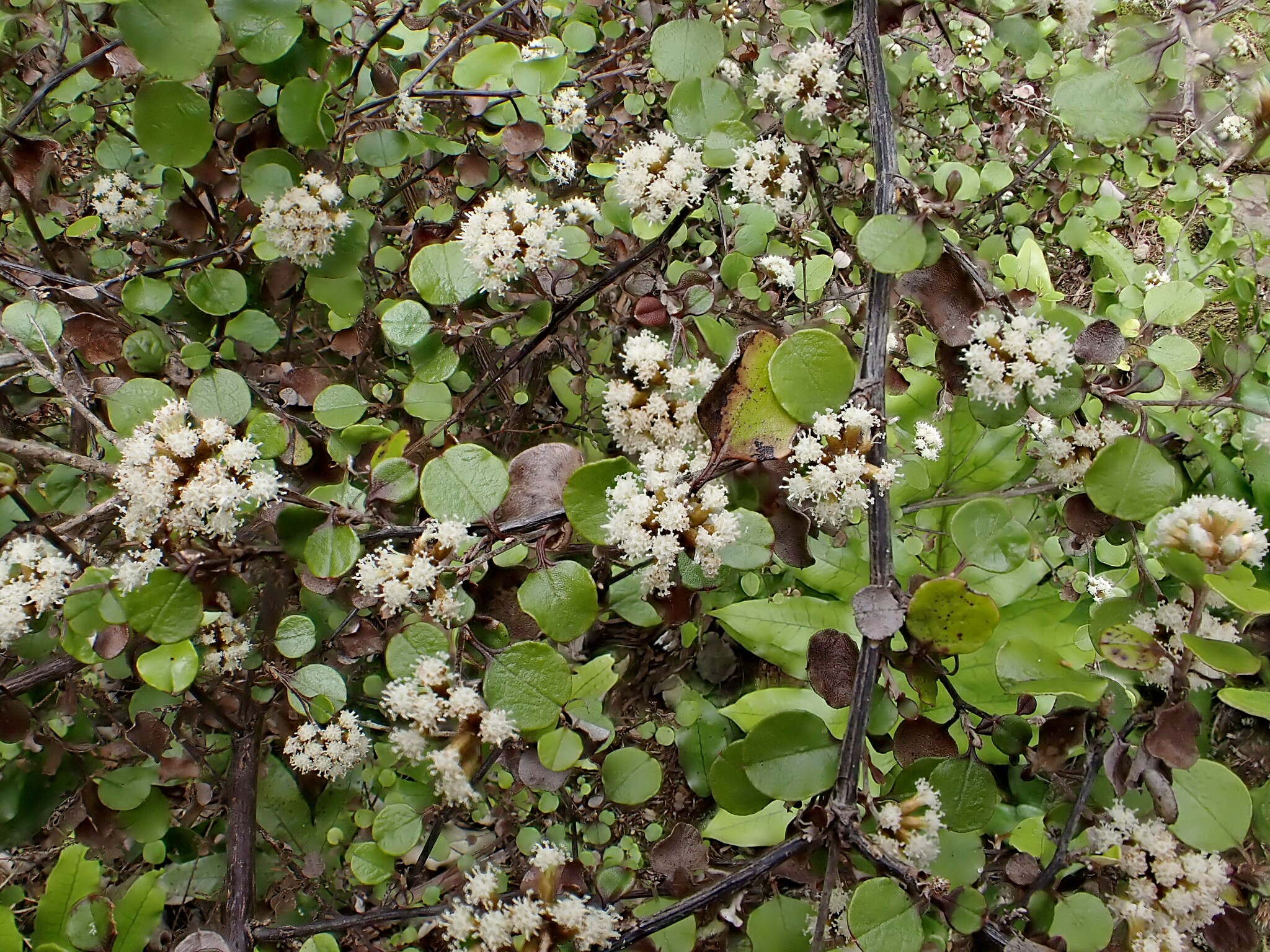
H. lanceolatum, larval host plant.

This species inhabits native scrub in coastal, lowland and montane areas. The larval host plant for this species is Helichrysum lanceolatum.

== Behaviour ==
Adults of this species are nocturnal and are attracted to light.
