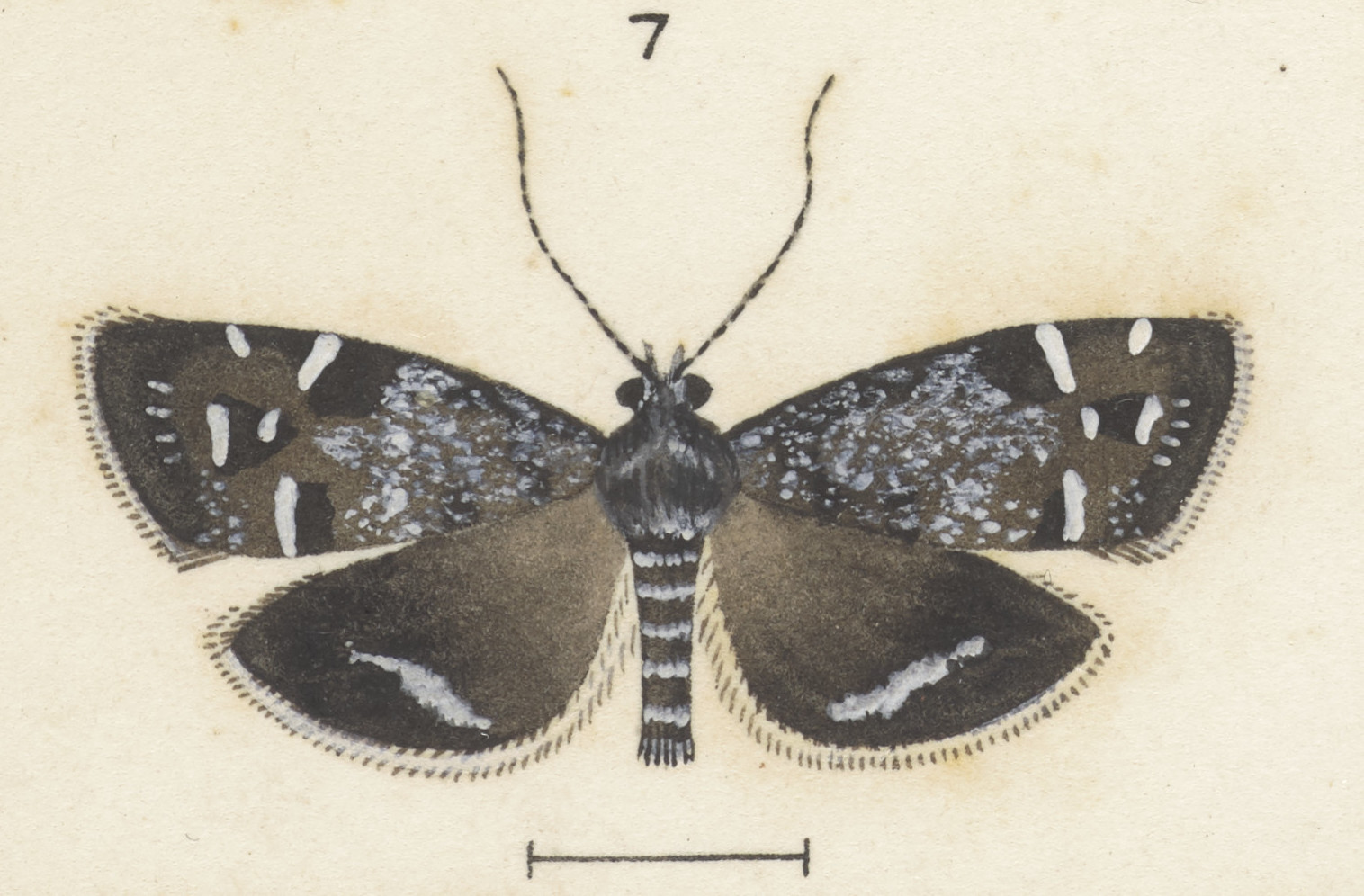

Scientific classification
- Kingdom: Animalia
- Phylum: Arthropoda
- Clade: Pancrustacea
- Class: Insecta
- Order: Lepidoptera
- Family: Choreutidae
- Genus: Asterivora
- Species: A. microlitha

Binomial name
- Asterivora microlitha (Meyrick, 1888)

Synonyms
- Simaethis microlitha Meyrick, 1888

= Asterivora microlitha =

Species of moth endemic to New Zealand

Asterivora microlitha is a species of moth in the family Choreutidae. This species was first described by Edward Meyrick in 1888. It is endemic to New Zealand and has been observed in both the North and South Islands. This species inhabits herbfields and scrub at alpine and subalpine altitudes. Adults are on the wing from September until February and larvae have been observed feeding on Helichrysum lanceolatum.

== Taxonomy ==
This species was first described by Edward Meyrick in 1888 and originally named Simaethis microlitha. In 1912 Meyrick restricted this species concept to include only those specimens used to first describe the species that were collected at Arthur's Pass. In 1927 Alfred Philpott studied the male genitalia of Simaethis microlitha. George Hudson discussed and illustrated this species under the original name in his 1928 book The butterflies and moths of New Zealand. In 1979 John S. Dugdale placed this species in the genus Asterivora. The female lectotype, collected at Arthur's Pass at an altitude of between 3,000 and 5,000 ft by Meyrick, is held at the Natural History Museum, London.

== Description ==
Meyrick described this species as follows:

♂♀. 9-10 mm. Head and thorax irrorated with white above ; scales of palpi longer and more projecting than in analoga ; antennae dotted with white : abdomen with segmental margins strongly white. Forewings more narrowed towards base than in ministra, fasciae of white irroration more strongly marked, fourth slender, but more sharply marked and brightly silvery-metallic above discal mark and at apex of dorsal section. Hindwings with white streak slender, regular, well-marked, extending 3/4 across wing from 3/4 of disc to middle of termen and thence running partially interrupted near termen almost to tornus.

== Distribution ==
This species is endemic to New Zealand. It has been observed in both the North and South Islands.

== Habitat and hosts ==
This species inhabits montane herbfields and scrub, often with species of Veronica present, at alpine and subalpine zones. A larval host plant of this species is Helichrysum lanceolatum.

== Behaviour ==
Adults have been recorded as being on the wing in from September until February.
