= List of shipwrecks in March 1874 =

The list of shipwrecks in March 1874 includes ships sunk, foundered, grounded, or otherwise lost during March 1874.

== 1 March ==
List of shipwrecks: 1 March 1874
Ship	State	Description
Anna	Norway	The schooner was beached at Lerwick, Shetland Islands, United Kingdom.
Farandus	Norway	The schooner was abandoned at sea. Her crew were rescued by the sealing steamship Haardrade (Norway). Farandus was on a voyage from Kristiansand to Stornoway, Isle of Lewis, United Kingdom.
Gudrun	Denmark	The schooner was driven ashore at Lunnasting, Shetland Islands with the loss of all hands, at least four lives. She was on a voyage from Copenhagen to Reykjavík, Iceland. The wreck was plundered by the local inhabitants.
Janus	Norway	The schooner was wrecked at Lerwick with the loss of all hands.
Problem	United Kingdom	The schooner sank at Warrenpoint, County Antrim. She was on a voyage from Paisley, Renfrewshire to Dublin.

== 2 March ==
List of shipwrecks: 2 March 1874
Ship	State	Description
Cybele	United Kingdom	The ship was wrecked near Peterhead, Aberdeenshire.
Germania	United Kingdom	The ship was wrecked near Newburgh, Fife. She was on a voyage from Riga, Russia to South Shields, County Durham.
Gitana	Germany	The brig was driven ashore and wrecked 3 nautical miles (5.6 km) north of Seaham, County Durham, United Kingdom. She was refloated and towed in to Sunderland, County Durham in a waterlogged condition.
Margaret	United States	The schooner was driven ashore and wrecked near Kake in the Department of Alaska during a snowstorm. Her crew of three survived.
Percy	United Kingdom	The ship was driven ashore at Exmouth, Devon. She was on a voyage from Portsmouth, Hampshire to Par, Cornwall.
President Thiers	France	The full-rigged ship foundered. Her crew were rescued by Bertha (United Kingdom).
Tubal Cain	United Kingdom	The barque was abandoned at sea. Her crew were rescued by the fishing vessel Leverette (France). Tubal Cain was on a voyage from Liverpool, Lancashire to Limerick.
Walter Scott	United Kingdom	The schooner was wrecked on Islay, Inner Hebrides.

== 3 March ==
List of shipwrecks: 3 March 1874
Ship	State	Description
Ausgar	Norway	The ship was abandoned in the Atlantic Ocean (25°00′N 9°20′W). Her crew were rescued by the barque St. Mirren (United Kingdom). Ausgar was on a voyage from Santander, Spain to Sligo, United Kingdom.

== 4 March ==
List of shipwrecks: 4 March 1874
Ship	State	Description
Burmah	Canada	The ship was abandoned in the Atlantic Ocean. She was on a voyage from Pensacola, Florida, United States to Liverpool, Lancashire, United Kingdom.
Elina	Denmark	The ship departed from Haiti for a European port. No further trace, presumed foundered with the loss of all hands.
Marie	Germany	The schooner was wrecked on Flores Island, Azores with the loss of all hands.

== 5 March ==
List of shipwrecks: 5 March 1874
Ship	State	Description
Camilla	United Kingdom	The steamship ran aground in the Douro. She was refloated and resumed her voyage.
Enterprise	Belgium	The steamship stranded off Brouwershaven, Zeeland, Netherlands and broke her back. Declared a total loss. She was on a voyage from Antwerp to Pillau, Germany.
Hare	Sweden	The schooner was towed in to Montrose, Forfarshire, United Kingdom in a capsized condition She was on a voyage from Halmstad to West Hartlepool, County Durham, United Kingdom.
Maria Benvenuto	Italy	The barque was wrecked at Barnegat, New Jersey, United States. She was on a voyage from Cagliari, Sardinia to New York, United States.
Volunteer	United Kingdom	The barque was wrecked on the Haisborough Sands, in the North Sea off the coast of Norfolk. Her crew were rescued by the schooner Thirza (United Kingdom). Volunteer was on a voyage from Sunderland, County Durham to Venice, Kingdom of Italy.

== 6 March ==
List of shipwrecks: 6 March 1874
Ship	State	Description
Mary Van Every	New Zealand	The 41-ton schooner was being towed across the bar at the mouth of the Molyneux River by the steamship Lady of the Lake (New Zealand) in a heavy swell. Both ships grounded, but a swell carried the Lady of the Lake free and in doing so broke the towline. The Mary Van Every was struck broadside on by several breakers and carried onto rocks. Her crew survived.
Nomad	United Kingdom	The schooner was wrecked near Mazagan, Morocco. She was on a voyage from Cádiz, Spain to Safi, Morocco.

== 7 March ==
List of shipwrecks: 7 March 1874
Ship	State	Description
Cyrus	New Zealand	The 317-ton collier, a barque, was caught by a violent storm in Cook Strait while en route from Wellington to Newcastle, New South Wales, and was wrecked to the east of Sinclair Head. The ship was in company with Wellington (New Zealand), which was also wrecked. Five of the twelve on board Cyrus, two crew and three passengers, died.
Junon	France	The steamship was driven ashore at Piraeus, Greece, or Marseille, Bouches-du-Rhône. She was later refloated.
Randolph or Helen Burns	New Zealand	The 20-ton schooner capsized and sank near the entrance to Lyttelton Harbour. All hands were saved.
Wellington	New Zealand	The 696-ton collier was caught by a violent storm in Cook Strait while en route from Wellington to Newcastle, New South Wales, and was wrecked to the east of Sinclair Head. The ship was in company with Cyrus, which was also wrecked. Two of the eleven crew on board Wellington died.

== 8 March ==
List of shipwrecks: 8 March 1874
Ship	State	Description
American, and Aracan	United Kingdom	The ship Aracan collided with the steamship American and sank in the English Channel 17 nautical miles (31 km) off Portland, Dorset with the loss of a crew member. Survivors were rescued by Syrian (United Kingdom). Aracan was on a voyage from London to Hong Kong. American was on a voyage from the Cape Colony to Southampton, Hampshire. She was towed in to Southampton by Syrian.
Tacna	United Kingdom	The steamship capsized and sank in the Pacific Ocean 50 nautical miles (93 km) off the coast of Chile with the loss of nineteen lives. She was on a voyage from Valparaíso to Los Vilos, Chile.

== 9 March ==
List of shipwrecks: 9 March 1874
Ship	State	Description
Bamborough	United Kingdom	The steamship ran aground at the mouth of the River Tees. Her eleven crew were rescued by the Seaton Lifeboat Job Hindley ( Royal National Lifeboat Institution). She was on a voyage from Hamburg, Germany to North Shields, Northumberland.
Brockham	United Kingdom	The ship was driven ashore at Barbados. She was on a voyage from Trinidad to Barbados. She was declared a total loss.
Silver Lining	New Zealand	The 219-ton brig struck a reef while attempting to gain shelter at Kakanui, New Zealand, during a stiff gale. Her hull was badly holed by the reef and the rudder had become dislodged, so the decision was taken to abandon ship.

== 10 March ==
List of shipwrecks: 10 March 1874
Ship	State	Description
Adieu	United Kingdom	The barque ran aground at the mouth of the River Mersey. She was on a voyage from Liverpool, Lancashire to Baltimore, Maryland, United States. She was refloated and put back to Liverpool for repairs.
Argyle	United Kingdom	The steamship ran aground at Dragør, Denmark.
Howard	Canada	The barque was abandoned in the Atlantic Ocean. Her crew were rescued by Meteor (United Kingdom). Howard was on a voyage from Jamaica to Queenstown, County Cork, United Kingdom.
Fanny Buller	United Kingdom	The ship departed from A Coruña, Spain for Plymouth, Devon. No further trace, presumed foundered with the loss of all seven crew.
Lindisfarne	United Kingdom	The brig was driven ashore at Råbjerg, Denmark with the loss of seven of her nine crew. She was on a voyage from Blyth, Northumberland to Danzig Germany.
Ranneys	United Kingdom	The ship ran aground on the Spanish Ledges. She was on a voyage from Cardiff, Glamorgan to Palermo, Sicily, Italy. She was refloated and taken in to Palermo.
San Antonio	Italy	The barque was wrecked on the Tuskar Rock. Her crew were rescued by a fishing smack. She was on a voyage from Troon, Ayrshire, United Kingdom to Genoa.
Sun Foo	United Kingdom	The steamship ran aground on Reef Island, 30 nautical miles (56 km) off Hong Kong and was wrecked. All on board were rescued.
Wellington	United Kingdom	The ship foundered in the North Sea 25 nautical miles (46 km) south east of Lowestoft, Suffolk. Her crew were rescued by the fishing smack Dauphin (France). Wellington was on a voyage from Saint Andrews, Fife to London.
Unnamed	Flag unknown	A barque foundered 1 nautical mile (1.9 km) off the Brandies, off the coast of County Waterford, United Kingdom. Her crew were presumed to have been rescued by fishing boats.

== 11 March ==
List of shipwrecks: 11 March 1874
Ship	State	Description
Jane	United Kingdom	The Mersey Flat sank at Birkenhead, Cheshire.
Luigia Madre	Flag unknown	The ship caught fire at Singapore, Straits Settlements and was scuttled. She was refloated on 26 March.
Richard	United Kingdom	The Mersey Flat sank at Birkenhead. She was refloated.
(not named)	United Kingdom	The dredger capsized in the River Forth with the loss of a crew member. She was being towed from the Clyde to Alloa, Clackmannanshire. She was refloated on 7 April and towed in to Alloa, where she sank. Refloated on 9 April, subsequently repaired and entered service.

== 12 March ==
List of shipwrecks: 12 March 1874
Ship	State	Description
Fiery Cross	United Kingdom	The lugger was wrecked at Eyemouth, Berwickshire. Her crew were rescued.

== 13 March ==
List of shipwrecks: 13 March 1874
Ship	State	Description
Anazi	United Kingdom	The ship was driven ashore at Wellington, New Zealand. She was on a voyage from London to Wellington. She was refloated with the assistance of a steamship.
Flying Meteor	United Kingdom	The paddle tugboat suffered an engine failure and consequently foundered off the Calf of Man, Isle of Man. Her crew were rescued by the barque Ravensbourne (United Kingdom), which she was towing from Liverpool, Lancashire to Troon, Ayrshire.
Little Susannah	United Kingdom	The ship collided with the barque Elizabeth (United Kingdom) and foundered 1 nautical mile (1.9 km) off Sheerness, Kent. Her four crew were rescued by the smack Active (United Kingdom).
Silbury	United Kingdom	The steamship was driven ashore at Lydden Spout, Kent. She was on a voyage from Cardiff, Glamorgan to London. She was refloated and taken in to The Downs flooded at the bow.

== 14 March ==
List of shipwrecks: 14 March 1874
Ship	State	Description
Queen Elizabeth	United Kingdom	The steamship was wrecked near Tarifa, Spain with the loss of twenty of the 71 people on board. She was on a voyage from Calcutta, India to London.

== 15 March ==
List of shipwrecks: 15 March 1874
Ship	State	Description
Belle of the Clyde	United Kingdom	The ship was wrecked on Grand Cayman, Cayman Islands. She was on a voyage from Liverpool, Lancashire to Tobasco.
Clara	United Kingdom	The brig was wrecked on Skagen, Denmark. Her crew were rescued. She was on a voyage from Middlesbrough, Yorkshire to Gothenburg, Sweden.
Hannah	United Kingdom	The ketch ran aground on the Gore, in the Bristol Channel. She was refloated with the assistance of a steamship and taken in to Bridgwater, Somerset.

== 16 March ==
List of shipwrecks: 16 March 1874
Ship	State	Description
Albert	United Kingdom	The brig was wrecked on Saona Island, Dominican Republic. Her crew were rescued. She was on a voyage from Glasgow, Renfrewshire to Falmouth, Jamaica.
Hey Dick	United Kingdom	The ship was driven ashore at Winterton-on-Sea, Norfolk. She was on a voyage from Woolwich, Kent to Goole, Yorkshire. She was refloated the next day and resumed her voyage.

== 17 March ==
List of shipwrecks: 17 March 1874
Ship	State	Description
Adonis	United Kingdom	The schooner ran aground on Crundell's Rocks, in the River Suir.
Adoram	United Kingdom	The ship ran aground on the Maglin Rocks and sank. Her crew were rescued.
Alexander II	Russia	The steamship ran aground on the Englishman's Shoal, in the Baltic Sea.
Arton	United Kingdom	The steamship ran aground on the Stoney Binks, in the North Sea off the mouth of the Humber. She was on a voyage from Port Said, Egypt to Hull, Yorkshire. She was refloated and taken in to Hull.
British Empire	United Kingdom	The ship collided with the paddle tug W. Scott (United Kingdom) and ran aground in the River Tay. She was on a voyage from Calcutta, India to Dundee, Forfarshire. She was refloated.
Cesar	Norway	The schooner was abandoned in the North Sea off Schiermonnikoog, Friesland, Netherlands. Her eight crew were rescued by the fishing smack Adele (Belgium). Cesar was on a voyage from Christiania to Southampton, Hampshire, United Kingdom.
Industry	United Kingdom	The schooner sank at Girvan, Ayrshire. Her crew were rescued by the Girvan Lifeboat Earl of Carrick ( Royal National Lifeboat Institution).
Ingolf	Russia	The schooner was driven ashore and wrecked on Skagen, Denmark. She was on a voyage from Königsberg, Germany to Brussels, East Flanders, Belgium.
John Corliss	United States	The fishing schooner was lost on Half Moon Rocks, near Barrington, Nova Scotia. Crew saved.
Princess	United Kingdom	The brig was driven ashore near Berwick upon Tweed, Northumberland. She was on a voyage form London to the Firth of Forth. She was refloated and taken in to Berwick upon Tweed.
Princess Somawatty	United Kingdom	The barque was run into by the steamship Indus (United Kingdom) and sank in the River Thames at Gravesend, Kent. All on board survived. She was on a voyage from London to Bombay, India. She was refloated on 9 April and taken in to a dry dock.
Schiller	Germany	The steamship ran aground on the Krant Sand, in the North Sea off the German coast. She was on a voyage from New York to Hamburg. She was refloated and taken in to Hamburg in a leaky condition.
Seaforth	United Kingdom	The brig departed from Blyth, Northumberland for Helsingør, Denmark. No further trace, presumed foundered with the loss of all hands.
Spartan	Canada	The schooner was driven ashore at Rhoscolyn, Caernarfonshire, United Kingdom. Her crew were rescued. she was on a voyage from Hayle, Cornwall to Liverpool, Lancashire, United Kingdom.
Spinner	United Kingdom	The brig departed from Blyth for Lübeck, Germany. No further trace, presumed foundered with the loss of all hands.
Unnamed	Flag unknown	A schooner was wrecked at Mytilene, Greece with the loss of all hands.

== 18 March ==
List of shipwrecks: 18 March 1874
Ship	State	Description
Elisa Forbes	United Kingdom	The ship departed from Blyth, Northumberland. No further trace, presumed foundered with the loss of all hands.
Enterprise	France	The barque was abandoned in the Mediterranean Sea. Her crew were rescued by La Pace (France). Enterprise subsequently foundered. She was on a voyage from Cardiff, Glamorgan, United Kingdom to Nice, Alpes-Maritimes.
William Batters	United Kingdom	The steamship collided with the steamship Pizarro (Spain) in the Guadiana and was beached. She was on a voyage from Pomaron, Portugal to South Shields, County Durham. She was refloated and taken in to Villareal, Spain, where she was repaired.
Unnamed	United Kingdom	A schooner was wrecked on the Mugland Rock, off the coast of County Dublin.

== 19 March ==
List of shipwrecks: 19 March 1874
Ship	State	Description
Adelchi Bignani	Germany	The ship was wrecked on Borkum. Her crew were rescued.
Augusta	United Kingdom	The ship was driven ashore at Lindisfarne, Northumberland. She was on a voyage from Invergordon, Ross-shire to London. She was refloated the next day and found to be leaky.
Chalmers	United Kingdom	The barque was wrecked on the Murray Reef, 30 nautical miles (56 km) off Fremantle, Western Australia. She was on a voyage from Mauritius to Fremantle.
Commerce	United Kingdom	The sloop was driven ashore and wrecked at Whitehaven, Cumberland with the loss of two of her three crew.
Emerald	United Kingdom	The schooner was driven ashore and wrecked 2 nautical miles (3.7 km) north of Ayr. Her crew were rescued. She was on a voyage from an Irish port to Liverpool, Lancashire. She was refloated on 8 April and taken in to Troon, Ayrshire.
Henry M. Hine	United Kingdom	The brigantine foundered off St. Catherine's Island, Pembrokeshire. She was on a voyage carrying coal from Neath, Glamorgan to Cork. She was refloated on 18 April.
Krydseren	Norway	The schooner was driven ashore on Læsø, Denmark. She was on a voyage from Holmestrand to London, United Kingdom.
Rover	United Kingdom	The tug was driven ashore and wrecked at Garroch Head, Argyllshire.
Unnamed	United Kingdom	A Yorkshire Billyboy collided with the Cockle Lightship ( Trinity House ) and foundered in the North Sea off the coast of Norfolk with the loss of all hands. She was under tow by the steamship Ocean (United Kingdom), which had also collided with the lightship.

== 20 March ==
List of shipwrecks: 20 March 1874
Ship	State	Description
A. E. Denham	United Kingdom	The steamship foundered off Læsø, Denmark. Her crew were rescued. She was on a voyage from Newcastle upon Tyne, Northumberland to Copenhagen, Denmark.
Alpha	United Kingdom	The ship was driven ashore at Lindisfarne, Northumberland. She was refloated.
Hurrel	United Kingdom	The ship was travelling between Padstow, Cornwall to Swansea. She foundered off Breaksea Point and the crew taken to Cardiff.
James Rankine	United Kingdom	The steamship was driven ashore in the Carron River. She was refloated.
Margaret	United Kingdom	The steamship struck the pier at Liverpool, Lancashire and was consequently beached. She was on a voyage from Valencia, Spain to Liverpool.
Matador	Germany	The ship ran aground on the Sunenplate. She was refloated on 18 April with the assistance of five tugs and taken in to the Geeste.
Nil	France	The steamship struck a sunken rock and sank in the Inland Sea of Japan off Cape Idzu with the loss of 142 lives. She was on a voyage from Hong Kong to Yokohama, Japan.
Pantaloon	United Kingdom	The brig was abandoned in the North Sea 250 nautical miles (460 km) off Tynemouth Castle, County Durham. Her crew were rescued by the smack Boiler and the dandy Violet (both United Kingdom). Pantaloon was on a voyage from Blyth, Northumberland to a Baltic port.
Prince	United Kingdom	The steamship ran aground at Grangemouth, Stirlingshire. She was refloated.
Unnamed	Germany	A pilot boat, a schooner, departed from Cuxhaven. No further trace, presumed foundered with the loss of all eleven people on board.

== 21 March ==
List of shipwrecks: 21 March 1874
Ship	State	Description
Doretta	Germany	The ship ran aground on the Oysterplatte, in the Harle and was wrecked. She was on a voyage from London, United Kingdom to Bremen. She was refloated on 30 March and taken in to Carolinensiel.
Olive	(United Kingdom of Great Britain and Ireland) Isle of Man	The fishing smack was run down and sunk off the Old Head of Kinsale, County Cork by the full-rigged ship Oakworth (United Kingdom), which failed to render assistance. Her captain's certificate was consequently cancelled. Olive's crew had survived the collision, but later drowned.
Schiller	Germany	The brig was driven ashore at Ottendorf. She was on a voyage from Hamburg to Grangemouth, Stirlingshire, United Kingdom.
Venetia	United Kingdom	The steamship ran aground off Bowerlie Castle. She was on a voyage from Odesa, Russia to Queenstown, County Cork.

== 22 March ==
List of shipwrecks: 22 March 1874
Ship	State	Description
Christine Marie	Denmark	The schooner was driven ashore near Thisted. Her crew were rescued. She was on a voyage from Hartlepool, County Durham, United Kingdom to Nykøbing.
E. A. Carrington	(United Kingdom of Great Britain and Ireland) Guernsey	The brig was destroyed by fire in the Atlantic Ocean. Her crew survived. She was on a voyage from Bahia, Brazil to Hamburg, Germany.
Era	United Kingdom	The schooner was driven ashore at Campbeltown, Argyllshire. She was on a voyage from Glasgow, Renfrewshire to Dublin.

== 23 March ==
List of shipwrecks: 23 March 1874
Ship	State	Description
Attofts	United Kingdom	The steamship was driven ashore at Spurn Point, Yorkshire. She was on a voyage from Rouen, Seine-Inférieure, France to Hull, Yorkshire. She was refloated and completed her voyage.
Charles A. Farwell	United States	The barque was driven ashore on Anholt, Denmark. She was on a voyage from Savannah, Georgia to Reval, Russia.
Eugenie	United Kingdom	The ship foundered in the Atlantic Ocean. Her crew were rescued by Hamilton (United Kingdom). Eugenie was on a voyage from Portugal to the Newfoundland Colony.
Francis Thomas	United Kingdom	The schooner ran aground in the Maas.
H. D. Pochin	Netherlands	The steamship was driven ashore at Hellevoetsluis, Zeeland. She was on a voyage from Bône, Algeria to Rotterdam, South Holland. She was refloated with assistance.
Hercules	New Zealand	The 139-ton brigantine went ashore near the mouth of the Kaipara Harbour while en route to Sydney with a cargo of timber. All hands survived.
L. G. Bigelow	United Kingdom	The ship ran aground on the Cannon Rock off Donaghadee, County Down. She was on a voyage from Liverpool, Lancashire to Providence, Rhode Island, United States. She floated off in a severely leaky condition and was beached near Cloughy, County Down with the assistance of two steamships.
Livonia	(United Kingdom of Great Britain and Ireland) Guernsey	The brig ran aground on the Jenkin Sand, in the Thames Estuary.
Marie Mathilde	Sweden	The ship was lost in the Limfjord. Her crew were rescued. She was on a voyage from Nyköping to Hull.
Madge	United Kingdom	The brig foundered in the North Sea 80 nautical miles (150 km) west of Lindesnes, Norway with the loss of a crew member. Survivors were rescued by the steamship Kirkstall (United Kingdom).
Oberon	Sweden	The schooner was driven ashore near Kristiansand, Norway with the loss of all but one of her crew. She was on a voyage from Gothenburg to Shoreham-by-Sea, Sussex, United Kingdom. She subsequently broke up.

== 24 March ==
List of shipwrecks: 24 March 1874
Ship	State	Description
Akola	United Kingdom	The steamship ran aground on the Kentish Knock and broke in two. Her nineteen crew were rescued. She was on a voyage from Constanţa, Ottoman Empire to London.
Crescent City	United States	The steamboat exploded and sank in the Mississippi River at "Montezuma Island" with the loss of thirteen lives. She was on a voyage from New Orleans, Louisiana to St. Louis, Missouri.
Emilie	Germany	The barque ran aground on the Shipwash Sand, in the North Sea off the coast of Suffolk, United Kingdom. She was on a voyage from South Shields, County Durham, United Kingdom to San Francisco, California, United States. She was refloated and assisted in to Harwich, Essex, United Kingdom.

== 25 March ==
List of shipwrecks: 25 March 1874
Ship	State	Description
Furioso	Italy	The ship was driven ashore at Currituck, North Carolina, United States. She was on a voyage from Genoa to Baltimore, Maryland, United States.
Gascon, and St. Etienne	France	The ships collided. Gascon was abandoned. Some of her crew were rescued by Ville de Soller (France). St. Etienne sank. Her crew were rescued by Ville de Soller.
Hélène Burchard	United Kingdom	The ship ran aground at Copenhagen, Denmark. She was on a voyage from Liepāja, Russia to Hull, Yorkshire.
Markwell	United Kingdom	The barque was driven ashore and sank at Lyngby, Denmark. Her crew were rescued. she was on a voyage from Liverpool, Lancashire to Pillau, Germany.
Sjofna	Norway	The brig was abandoned ain the North Sea Her seven crew were rescued by the fishing smack Humber (United Kingdom). Sjofna was discovered by the sloop Azziel (United Kingdom) and towed in to Mandal.
Southern Cross	United Kingdom	The smack ran aground and capsized in the River Parrett. She was on a voyage from Swansea, Glamorgan to Bridgwater, Somerset.

== 26 March ==
List of shipwrecks: 26 March 1874
Ship	State	Description
City of Kandy	United Kingdom	The barque caught fire and sank at Hull, Yorkshire.
Live Oak	Canada	The barque foundered in the Atlantic Ocean. Her crew took to two boats; those in one of the boats were rescued by the brig Aino (Russia). Eleven crew in the second boat were reported missing. Live Oak was on a voyage from New York, United States to Queenstown, County Cork, United Kingdom.
Mexican	France	The steamship ran aground at Gonaïves, Haiti. She was on a voyage from Haiti to Havre de Grâce, Seine-Inférieure. She was refloated on 2 April and resumed her voyage.
Perseverante	France	The schooner was wrecked on the Madeleine Bank, off Cherbourg, Manche. Her crew were rescued. She was on a voyage from an English port to Isigny-sur-Mer, Manche.

== 27 March ==
List of shipwrecks: 27 March 1874
Ship	State	Description
Mary Mitchison	Norway	The brig was driven ashore and wrecked at Lemvig, Denmark with the loss of four of her crew. She was on a voyage from Hartlepool, County Durham, United Kingdom to Copenhagen, Denmark.
Tornado	United Kingdom	The ship sprang a severe leak in the Atlantic Ocean. She was on a voyage from Pensacola, Florida to Greenock, Renfrewshire. She was towed in to Gourock, Renfrewshire in a waterlogged condition on 30 March.

== 28 March ==
List of shipwrecks: 28 March 1874
Ship	State	Description
Electric	Germany	The brigantine was driven ashore and wrecked north of the mouth of the Rio Grande with the loss of a crew member. She was on a voyage from Lisbon, Portugal to the Rio Grande.
Holly Bough, and Leontine Suzanne	United Kingdom; France	The barques collided in the Mediterranean Sea 10 nautical miles (19 km) from Gibraltar. Holly Bough was severely damaged and put in to Gibraltar. She was on a voyage from Swansea, Glamorgan to Syros, Greece. Leontine Suzanne sank. She was on a voyage from Cardiff, Glamorgan to a French port.
Magnolia	Norway	The barque was wrecked at Ballyheigue, County Kerry, United Kingdom. Her crew were rescued by the Coastguard.
Perseverante	France	The schooner was wrecked on the Madeleine Bank. Her crew were rescued. She was on a voyage from an English port to Isigny-sur-Mer, Calvados.
Victoria	Norway	The schooner was driven ashore in Sinclairs Bay. Her crew were rescued.
Wanderer	United Kingdom	The brig was driven ashore near Silloth, Cumberland. She was on a voyage from Savannah, Georgia, United States to Silloth.
Sturgeon	United Kingdom	The fishing vessel was wrecked on Digg's Scar, near Ravenglass.

== 29 March ==
List of shipwrecks: 29 March 1874
Ship	State	Description
Carbonaria	United Kingdom	The ship ran aground in the Nieuw Diep and sank. She was on a voyage from Cardiff, Glamorgan to Hamburg, Germany.
Tugend	United Kingdom	The ship was abandoned in the Atlantic Ocean. Her crew were rescued by Leopoldine Iraude (France).

== 30 March ==
List of shipwrecks: 30 March 1874
Ship	State	Description
Adelphi	United Kingdom	The brig was wrecked on Tiree, Inner Hebrides with the loss of a crew member. She was on a voyage from Ardrossan, Ayrshire to Oran, Algeria.
Cartonaria	Germany	The brig ran aground off the Dutch coast. She was on a voyage from Cardiff, Glamorgan, United Kingdom to Hamburg. She was refloated and put in to the Nieuw Diep in a sinking condition.
Caspian	United Kingdom	The brig was wrecked on Colonsay, Inner Hebrides with the loss of all but one of the ten people on board. She was on a voyage from Marianople, Russia to Sligo.
Eugene	France	The schooner was wrecked at Pointe de la Coubre, Charente-Inférieure with the loss of four of her crew.
Hebe	Norway	The schooner ran aground and capsized in the Humber. Her crew were rescued. She was on a voyage from Christiania to Goole, Yorkshire, United Kingdom.
Julia	United Kingdom	The ship sank at Sunderland, County Durham. She was on a voyage from Sunderland to Woodbridge, Suffolk.
Juno	Germany	The ship was driven ashore at Hammeren, Denmark. Her crew were rescued. She was on a voyage from Gothenburg, Sweden to Königsberg.
St. Paul	France	The schooner was driven ashore at the Rammekens Castle, near Vlissingen, Zeeland, Netherlands. She was on a voyage from Antwerp to Honfleur, Manche.

== 31 March ==
List of shipwrecks: 31 March 1874
Ship	State	Description
Alaric	United Kingdom	The ship was driven ashore and wrecked on the Scars Rocks, near Solva, Pembrokeshire.
Flyn Nilsen	Denmark	The brig was driven ashore at Kollerup. She was abandoned as a total loss in April.
Idra	Greece	The brig was driven ashore and wrecked at "Elleborg", Zeeland, Netherlands with the loss of all but one of those on board. She was on a voyage from Constantinople, Ottoman Empire to Antwerp, Belgium.
Magnolia	Norway	The barque struck the Black Rock, in Ballyhuge Bay and was wrecked.
Rapide	United Kingdom	The ship caught fire and was beached at New Brighton, Cheshire. Her crew were rescued She was on a voyage from Pernambuco, Brazil to Liverpool, Lancashire Rapide was a total loss.
Tjumadoes	Greece	The brig was driven ashore and wrecked at Cornel Mawr, Carmarthenshire, United Kingdom. Her eight crew were rescued. She was on a voyage from Smyrna, Ottoman Empire to Berwick upon Tweed, Northumberland, United Kingdom.

== Unknown date ==
List of shipwrecks: Unknown date in March 1874
Ship	State	Description
Adria	United Kingdom	The barque was damaged in a hurricane at Mauritius between 25 and 30 March.
Agnes	Norway	The barque collided with another vessel and was abandoned in the North Sea before 22 March.
Ailsa	United Kingdom	The ship was damaged by fire at New Orleans, Louisiana, United States.
Algeria	France	The ship was driven ashore at Bolivar, United States. She was on a voyage from Havre de Grâce, Seine-Inférieure to Philadelphia, Pennsylvania, United States.
Almora	United Kingdom	The steamship ran aground on the Hastings Shoal, in the Rangoon River. She was refloated and resumed her voyage.
Alpington	United Kingdom	The barque was damaged in a hurricane at Mauritius between 25 and 30 March.
Annie Bingay	Canada	The ship ran aground in the Schuylkill River.
Antonia	United Kingdom	The ship was driven ashore at Torre del Mar, Spain. Her crew were rescued.
Araminta	United States	The ship was wrecked at Bermuda after 3 March. She was on a voyage from Savannah, Georgia to Liverpool, Lancashire, United Kingdom.
Ariel	France	The ship was abandoned off Málaga, Spain. Her crew were rescued by the Málaga Lifeboat. She was on a voyage from the Newfoundland Colony to Málaga. She was subsequent driven ashore, but was refloated and taken in to Málaga.
Augusta	Germany	The ship was abandoned in the Atlantic Ocean. Her crew were rescued. She was on a voyage from Liverpool to Savannah.
Balkan	United Kingdom	The barque was driven ashore and wrecked at Torre del Mar. Her crew were rescued.
Barbadian	United Kingdom	The ship sprang a severe leak off Inishtrahull, County Donegal between 20 and 24 March. She was on a voyage from the Clyde to Buenos Aires. She put back to the Clyde.
Benjamin Greene	United Kingdom	The barque was driven ashore and damaged in a hurricane at Mauritius between 25 and 30 March. She was refloated and placed under repair.
Billy Simpson	United Kingdom	The ship capsized at New York, United States after 11 March. She was later righted.
Blonde	(United Kingdom of Great Britain and Ireland) Isle of Man	The steamship foundered in the Irish Sea on or before 21 March with the loss of all hands. She was on a voyage from Laxey to Swansea, Glamorgan.
Caroline	United Kingdom	The ship caspsized in the North Sea on or before 20 March.
Cassini	Flag unknown	The ship ran aground at Portici, Italy. She was refloated and resumed her voyage.
Chaldea	United Kingdom	The steamship struck a sunken rock and was beached at Vingoria, India. All on board were rescued. She was on a voyage from Bombay, India to Colombo, Ceylon.
China	United Kingdom	The ship foundered in the Atlantic Ocean. Her crew were rescued. She was on a voyage from South Shields, County Durham to Quebec City, Canada.
City of Nankin	United Kingdom	The full-rigged ship was driven ashore in a cyclone at "China Buckeer".
City of Niagara	United Kingdom	The schooner was wrecked in the Gotō Islands after 19 March. She was on a voyage from Nagasaki to Taku, Japan.
Constance	United Kingdom	The steamship was driven ashore near Paimbœuf, Loire-Inférieure, France. She was on a voyage from Nantes, Loire-Inférieure to Liverpool.
Cora	United Kingdom	The ship ran aground at Figueira da Foz, Portugal. She was on a voyage from Cádiz, Spain to Figueira da Foz. She was refloated.
Craigewan	United States	The full-rigged ship was damaged in a hurricane at Mauritius between 25 and 30 March.
Deux Frères	France	The ship sprang a leak and sank at "Guerbaville".
Ecliptica	United Kingdom	The ship was driven ashore and wrecked at Vardø, Norway.
Eliza Cornish	United Kingdom	The schooner ran aground on the Goodwin Sands, Kent. She was refloated with assistance from the North Deal Lifeboat and taken in to The Downs.
Eliza Laine	United Kingdom	The ship was driven ashore on "Sheik Shaub Island". Her crew were rescued. She was on a voyage from Busreh, Persia to Batavia, Netherlands East Indies.
Eliza Oulton	Canada	The barque ran aground at Höganäs, Sweden. She was on a voyage from Savannah, Georgia, United States to Malmö. She had been refloated by 25 March and had resumed her voyage.
Embla	Norway	The schooner was abandoned in the North Sea. She was taken in to Cuxhaven, Germany by the fishing smack Blanche (United Kingdom).
Enterprise	France	The barque sprang a leak and foundered. Her crew were rescued. She was on a voyage from Cardiff to Nice, Alpes-Maritimes.
Excelsior	United States	The ship was driven ashore on the Willoughby Spit, Virginia. She was on a voyage from Santos, Brazil to New York.
Excelsior	(United Kingdom of Great Britain and Ireland) Guernsey	The ship foundered in the North Sea before 24 March.
Fortune	France	The full-rigged ship was damaged in a hurricane at Mauritius between 25 and 30 March.
Gelie	Germany	The ship ran aground near Wremen.
Glenure	France	The barque was damaged in a hurricane at Mauritius between 25 and 30 March.
Goothaab	Norway	The barque was wrecked at Langesund.
Gustave Petersen	Norway	The smack foundered in the North Sea on or before 22 March.
Harriet Williams	United Kingdom	The brigantine was wrecked in Dunny Cove, County Cork. Her seven crew were rescued by a Board of Customs gig.
Hartfield	United Kingdom	The ship was driven ashore in a hurricane at Mauritius between 25 and 30 March. She was refloated.
Havilah	United Kingdom	The ship was damaged in a hurricane at Mauritius between 25 and 30 March.
Hazel Holme	United Kingdom	The ship ran aground in a hurricane at Mauritius between 25 and 30 March. She was refloated.
Helen	United Kingdom	The ship departed from Whitby, Yorkshire in mid-March. No further trace, presumed foundered with the loss of all hands.
Iberian	United Kingdom	The steamship ran aground in the Sea of Marmara.
Industry	United Kingdom	The sloop was wrecked at Girvan, Ayrshire. Her three crew were rescued by the Girvan Lifeboat.
Ionian	United Kingdom	The schooner was driven ashore in the Nieuw Diep. She was on a voyage from the Nieuw Diep to Newcastle upon Tyne, Northumberland.
Johann Heinrich	Germany	The schooner was wrecked at Casablanca, Morocco with the loss of all hands.
Julie	United Kingdom	The ship ran aground on the Salthammer Reef, in the Baltic Sea. She was on a voyage from Memel, Germany to Hartlepool, County Durham. She was refloated.
Leading Star	United Kingdom	The schooner was damaged in a hurricane at Mauritius between 25 and 30 March.
Leonore	France	The barque was damaged in a hurricane at Mauritius between 25 and 30 March.
Liburno	Austria-Hungary	The ship was wrecked on the west coast of Africa before 2 March.
Margaret Falconer	United Kingdom	The barque was damaged in a hurricane at Mauritius between 25 and 30 March.
Louisa	United Kingdom	The ship departed from South Shields in mid-March. No further trace, presumed foundered with the loss of all hands.
Maria	United Kingdom	The ship departed from South Shields in mid-March. No further trace, presumed foundered with the loss of all hands.
Maria Tantina	United Kingdom	The ship foundered with the loss of all hands on or before 8 March. She was on a voyage from Groningen to Cardiff, Glamorgan.
Marie	France	The ship was wrecked at Wells-next-the-Sea, Norfolk, United Kingdom. Her five crew were rescued by the Wells Lifeboat.
Mary Ann	United Kingdom	The ship foundered near Marstrand, Sweden with the loss of her captain. She was on a voyage from Blyth, Northumberland to Helsingør, Denmark.
Minerva	United Kingdom	The barque was driven ashore and wrecked at Torre del Mar. Her crew were rescued. She was on a voyage from South Shieldsto Torre del Mar.
Minnet	Sweden	The ship was driven ashore on the coast of Jutland. She was on a voyage from Cardiff to Copenhagen, Denmark. She was refloated and put in to Gothenburg, Sweden in a leaky condition.
Minnie Bruce	United Kingdom	The ship foundered in the Atlantic Ocean. Her crew were rescued. She was on a voyage from New York to Saint John's, Newfoundland Colony.
Nathaniel	United Kingdom	The ship was wrecked on Santa Rosa Island, Florida, United States. She was on a voyage from Liverpool, Lancashire to New Orleans.
Naworth Castle	United Kingdom	The barque was damaged in a hurricane at Mauritius between 25 and 30 March.
Nina Maria	United Kingdom	The ship was abandoned in the North Sea before 21 March with the loss of at least four of her crew. She was on a voyage from Vyborg, Grand Duchy of Finland to Hull, Yorkshire.
Oncle Felix	France	The barque was damaged in a hurricane at Mauritius between 25 and 30 March.
Oscar	Denmark	The schooner foundered in the North Sea. Her crew were rescued. She was on a voyage from Charlestown, Cornwall, United Kingdom to Aarhus.
Peter Brown	United Kingdom	The schooner was driven against the quayside at Peterhead, Aberdeenshire and was wrecked. She was on a voyage from London to Wick, Caithness.
Phœnix	United Kingdom	The ship was driven ashore at "Stonehouse". She was on a voyage from Liverpool to Savannah, Georgia.
Pondicherry	France	The barque was damaged in a hurricane at Mauritius between 25 and 30 March.
Promesi	Italy	The schooner was damaged in a hurricane at Mauritius between 25 and 30 March.
Rapido	United Kingdom	The barque was damaged in a hurricane at Mauritius between 25 and 30 March.
Sambo	United Kingdom	The ship was abandoned in the North Sea between 4 and 24 March. She was on a voyage from Drammen, Norway to a Scottish port.
Scotia	United Kingdom	The full-rigged ship was damaged in a hurricane at Mauritius between 25 and 30 March.
Scottish Lass	United Kingdom	The schooner was driven ashore at Kidsdale, Wigtownshire. Her five crew were rescued.
Sidi	United Kingdom	The ship was wrecked in the Columbia River. She was on a voyage from San Francisco, California to Portland, Oregon, United States.
Stad Papenburg	Germany	The ship was wrecked near Mazagan, Morocco.
St. John	United Kingdom	The cutter was abandoned in Broad Strand Bay, County Cork. Her seven crew were rescued by the Coastguard.
Toronto	United Kingdom	The barque was damaged in a hurricane at Mauritius between 25 and 30 March.
Victor Louis	France	The lugger was driven ashore in the Pentland Firth. Her crew were rescued. She was on a voyage from Dunkirk, Nord to Iceland.
Vigilia	United Kingdom	The ship was abandoned in the Atlantic Ocean. Her crew were rescued by Lilly ( Canada). Vigilia was on a voyage from Darien, Georgia, United States to London.
Waverley	United Kingdom	The schooner was wrecked on São Jorge Island, Azores.
White Fawn	United States	The schooner was lost sometime in March. Lost with all 12 hands.
William Anning	United Kingdom	The ship was lost whilst on a voyage from Philadelphia to Penarth, Glamorgan. Her crew were rescued.
