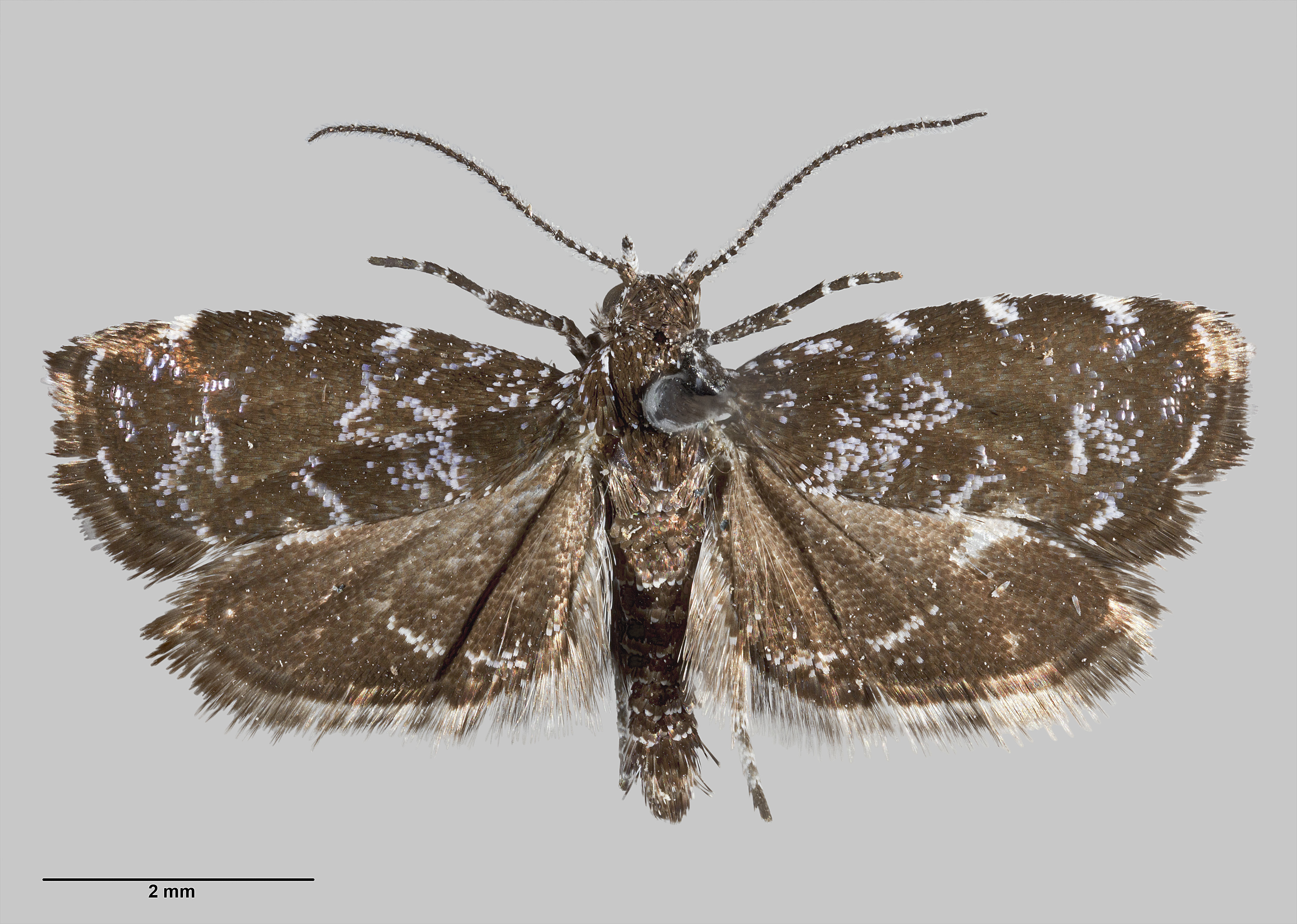
- Male syntype specimen
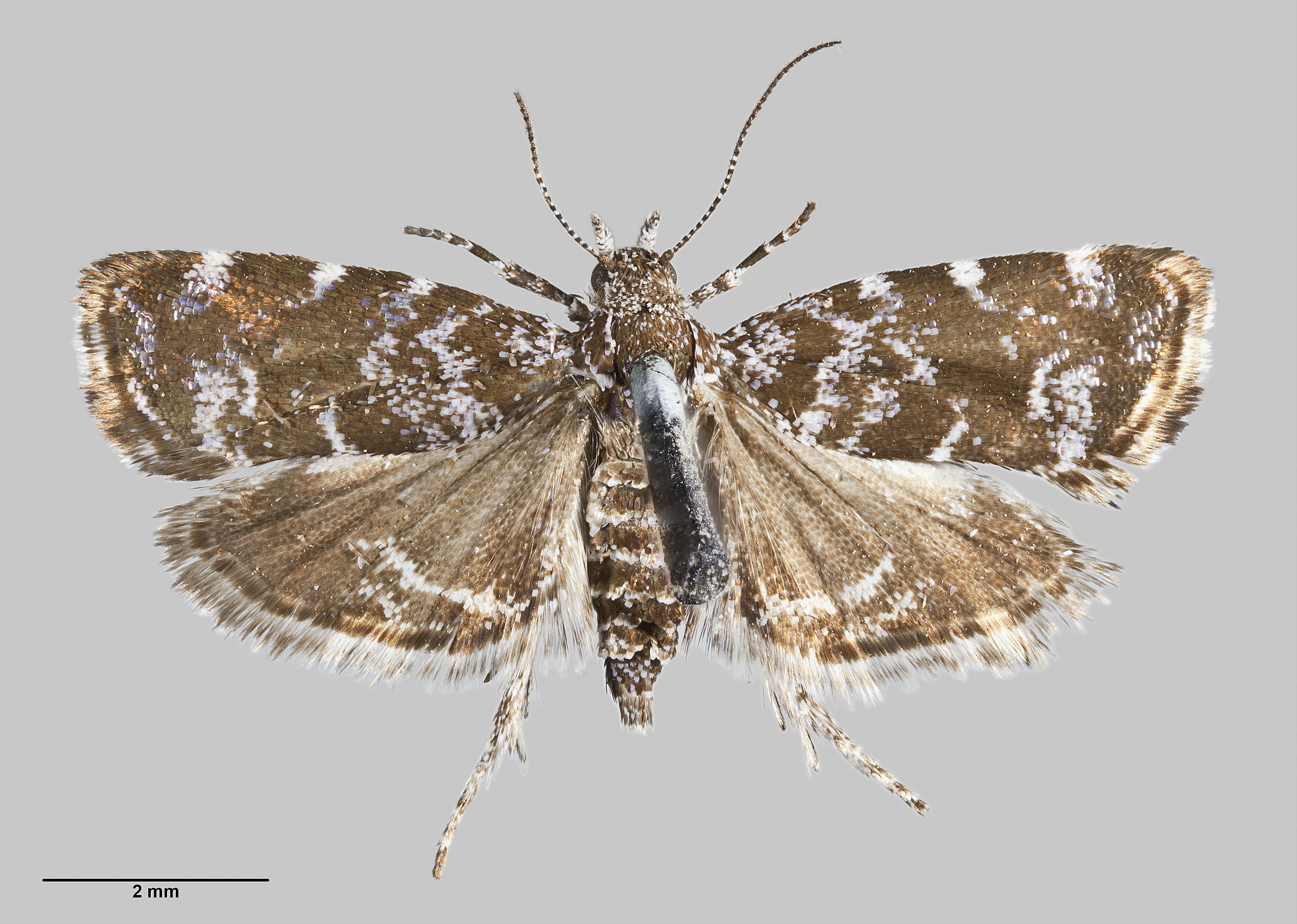
- Female syntype specimen

Scientific classification
- Kingdom: Animalia
- Phylum: Arthropoda
- Class: Insecta
- Order: Lepidoptera
- Family: Choreutidae
- Genus: Asterivora
- Species: A. chatuidea

Binomial name
- Asterivora chatuidea (Clarke, 1926)

Synonyms
- Simaethis chatuidea Clarke, 1926

= Asterivora chatuidea =

Species of moth

Asterivora chatuidea is a moth of the family Choreutidae. It is endemic to New Zealand and has been collected in and around Dunedin. The larvae of this species are leaf miners and hosts include Helichrysum lanceolatum, Olearia quinquevulnera and Pseudognaphalium luteoalbum. Adults of this species has been recorded as being on the wing in November, January and February.

== Taxonomy ==
This species was first described by Charles E. Clarke in 1926 using 12 specimens collected in November at Vauxhall, Andersons Bay in Dunedin. Clarke originally named the species Simaethis chatuidea. In 1979 J. S. Dugdale placed this species within the genus Asterivora. In 1988 Dugdale confirmed this placement. The male holotype specimen, as well as other specimens using in the naming of this species, are held at the Auckland War Memorial Museum.

== Description ==
The wingspan is about 8 mm for males and 9 mm for females.

== Distribution ==
This species is endemic to New Zealand. It has been collected in and around Dunedin.

== Behaviour ==
The adults of this species is on the wing in November, January and February.

== Hosts ==
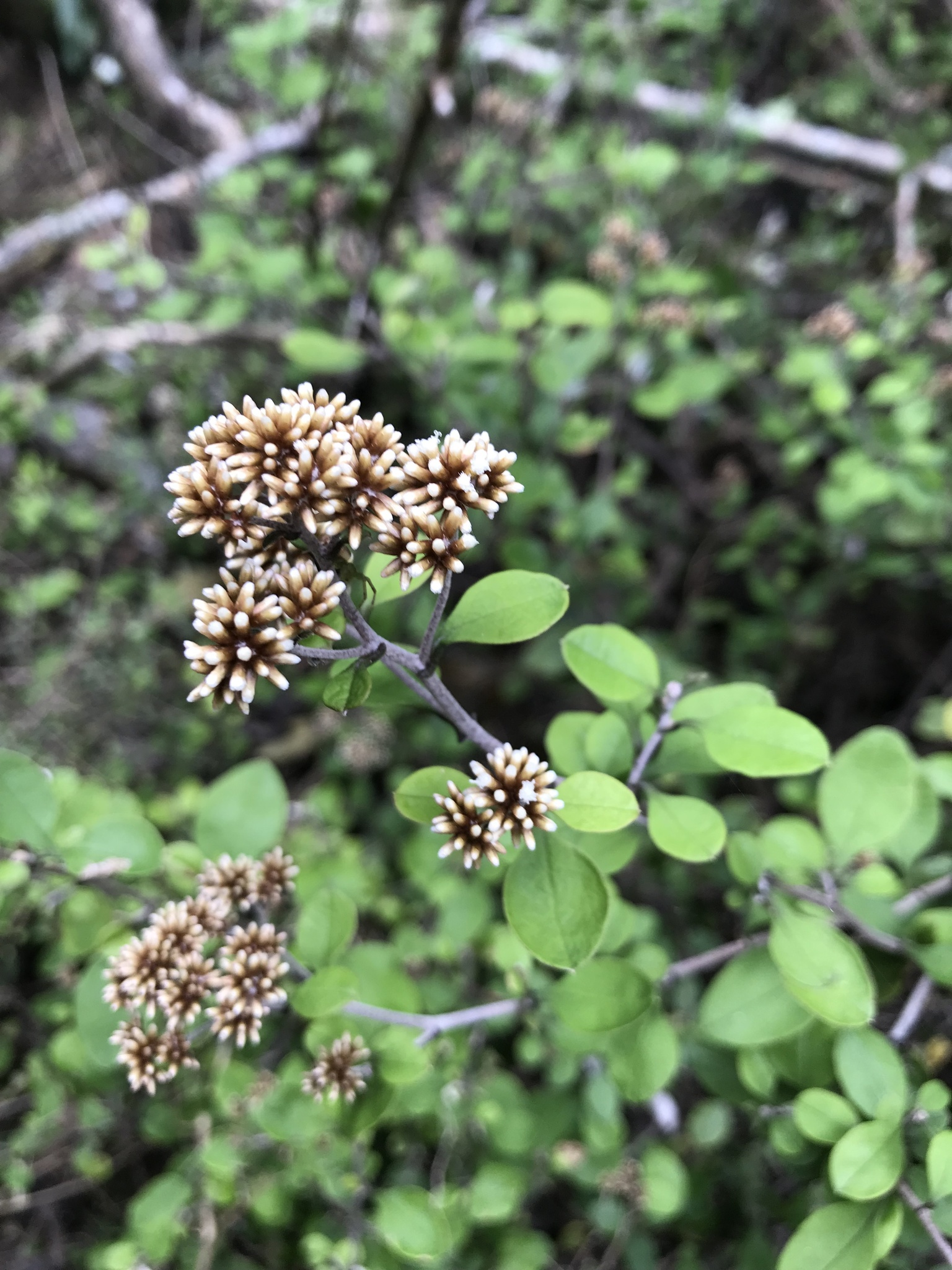
Helichrysum lanceolatum, a larval host plant of A. chatuidea.

The larvae of A. chatuidea are leaf miners and form distinctive damage on their host plants. These include Helichrysum lanceolatum, Olearia quinquevulnera and Pseudognaphalium luteoalbum.
