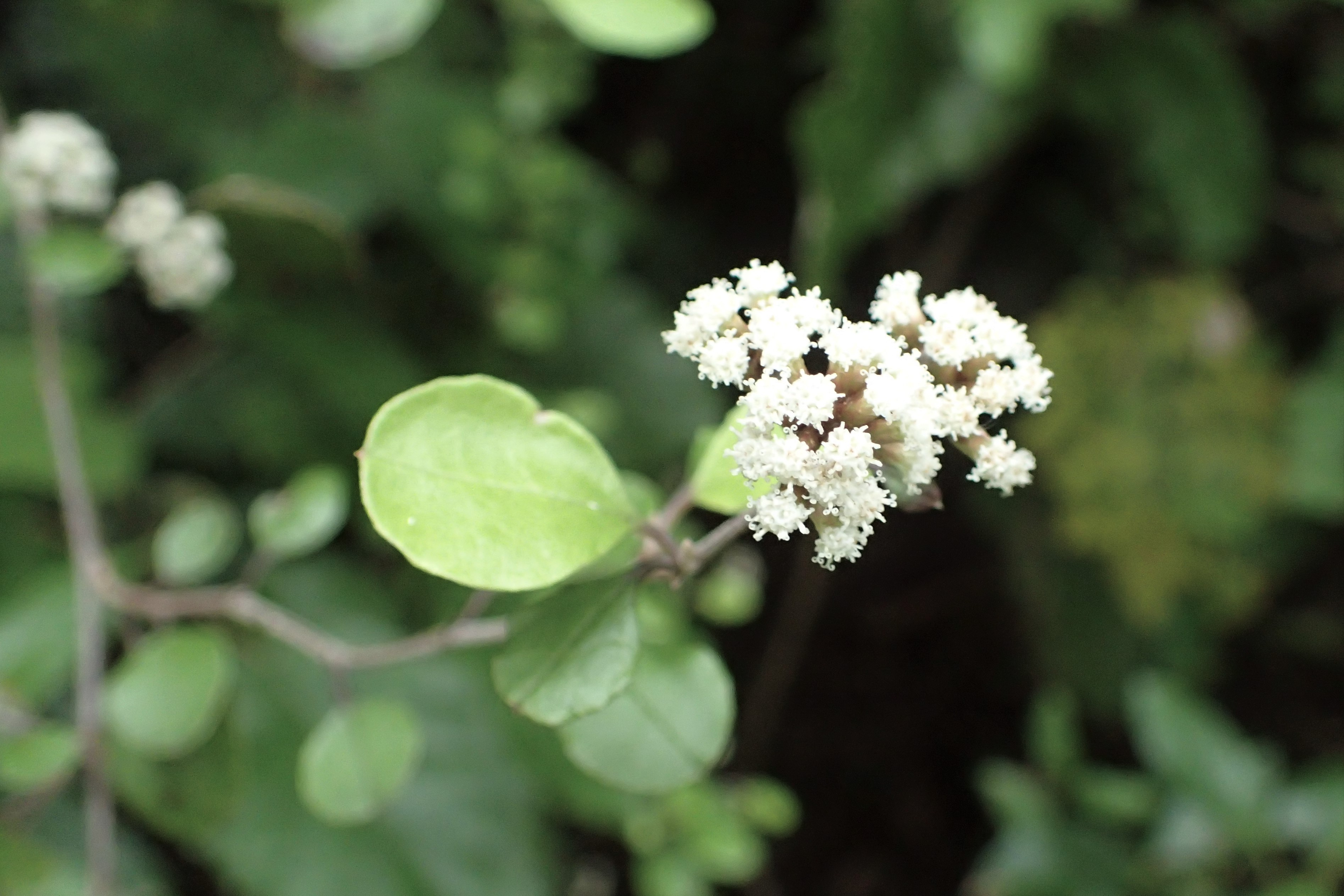

Scientific classification
- Kingdom: Plantae
- Clade: Tracheophytes
- Clade: Angiosperms
- Clade: Eudicots
- Clade: Asterids
- Order: Asterales
- Family: Asteraceae
- Genus: Helichrysum
- Species: H. lanceolatum

Binomial name
- Helichrysum lanceolatum (Buchanan) Kirk

Synonyms
- Ozothamnus lanceolatus Buchanan; Helichrysum glomeratum var. lanceolatum (Buchanan) Allan; Helichrysum glomeratum var. majus Allan; Swammerdamia glomerata Raoul; Helichrysum glomeratum (Raoul) Benth. et Hook.f. ex Kirk nom. illegit.; Helichrysum aggregatum Yeo

= Helichrysum lanceolatum =

Species of flowering plant

Helichrysum lanceolatum, commonly known as niniao, is a species of plant endemic to New Zealand.

== Description ==
Helichrysum lanceolatum is a member of the daisy family (Asteraceae) which is the most widely distributed and successful flowering family of plants in the world. H. lanceolatum is among a significant number of New Zealand Helichrysum species, nine of which are endemic to New Zealand. Many of these species grow into shrubs or trees and are woody, thus being termed tree daisy. The New Zealand endemic Helichrysum species are heterogeneous, meaning they are not uniform and have distinctive traits.

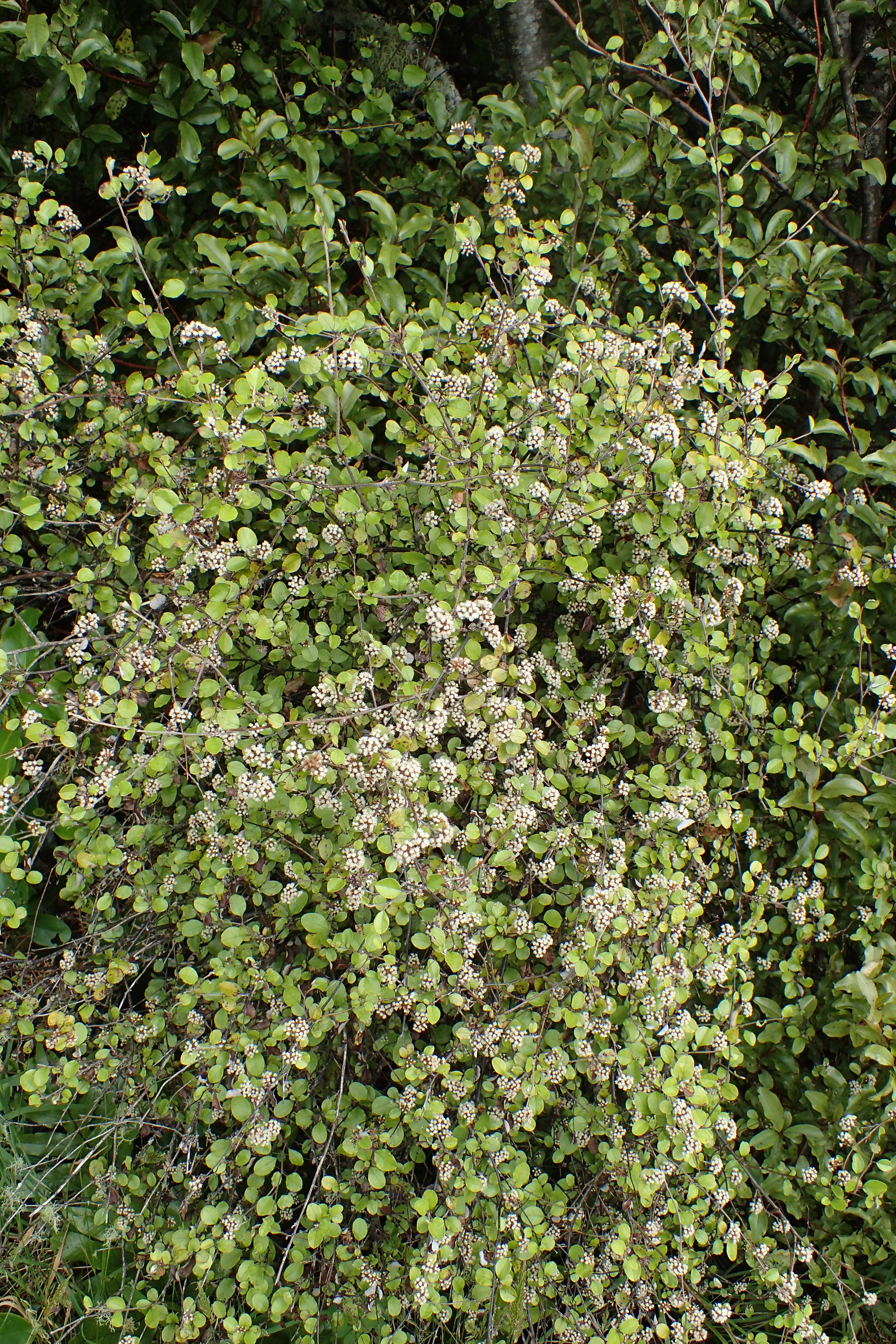
Helichrysum lanceolaum

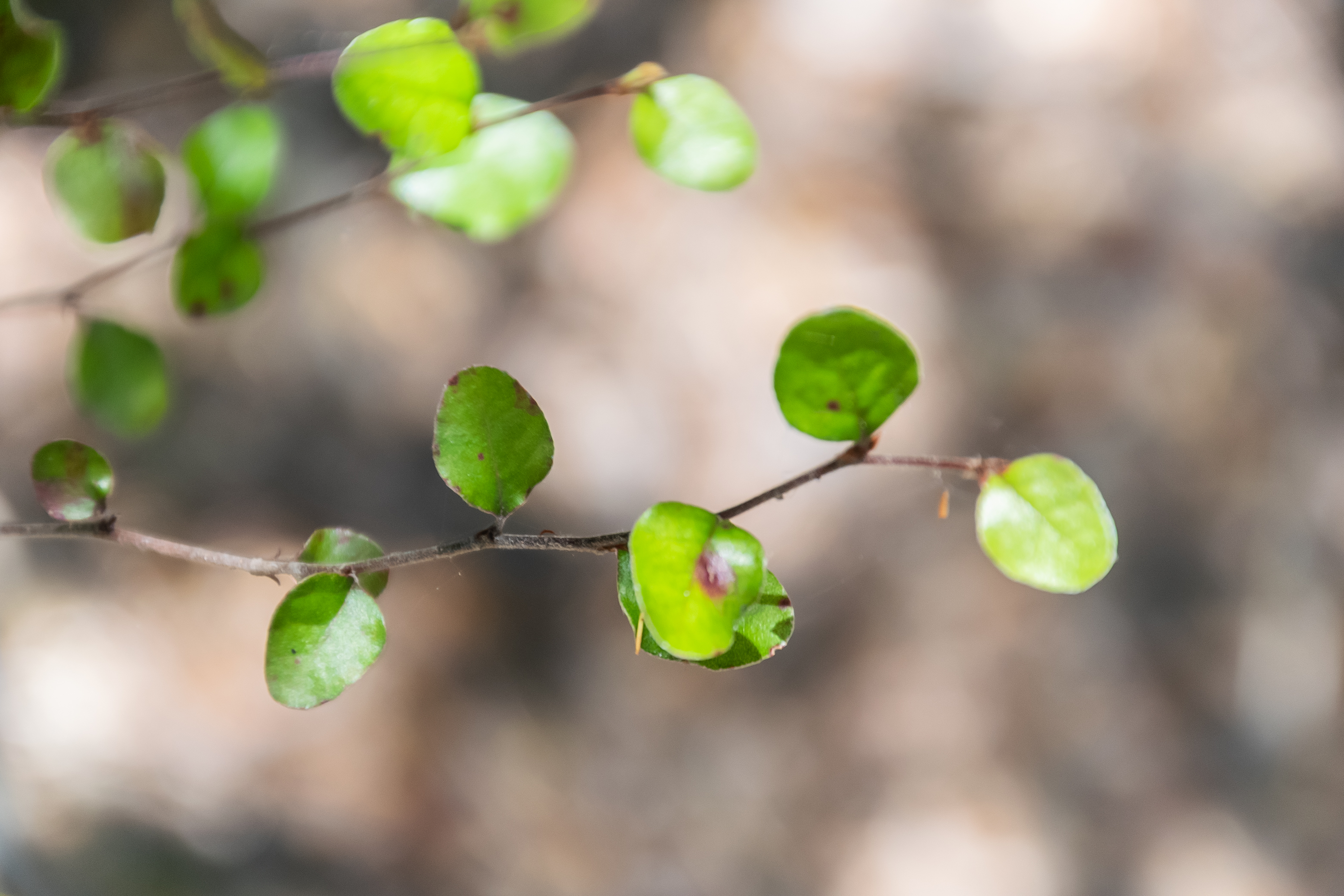
Detail of Helichrysum lanceolatum leaves

Helichrysum lanceolatum is a tangled, much branched, interlacing shrub, growing up to 3 m (9.8 ft) in height. It has light brown bark with slightly grooved branches and alternate leaves. Young branchlets are finely hairy and evolve from dark brown to lighter brown with dark streaks as the wood thickens and ages. The leaves are green/grey in colour and are pointed or rounded, smaller on flowering branches, and are arranged alternately along branches. The upper surface of the leaf is smooth, the tip is silver, and the underside is grey and downy.

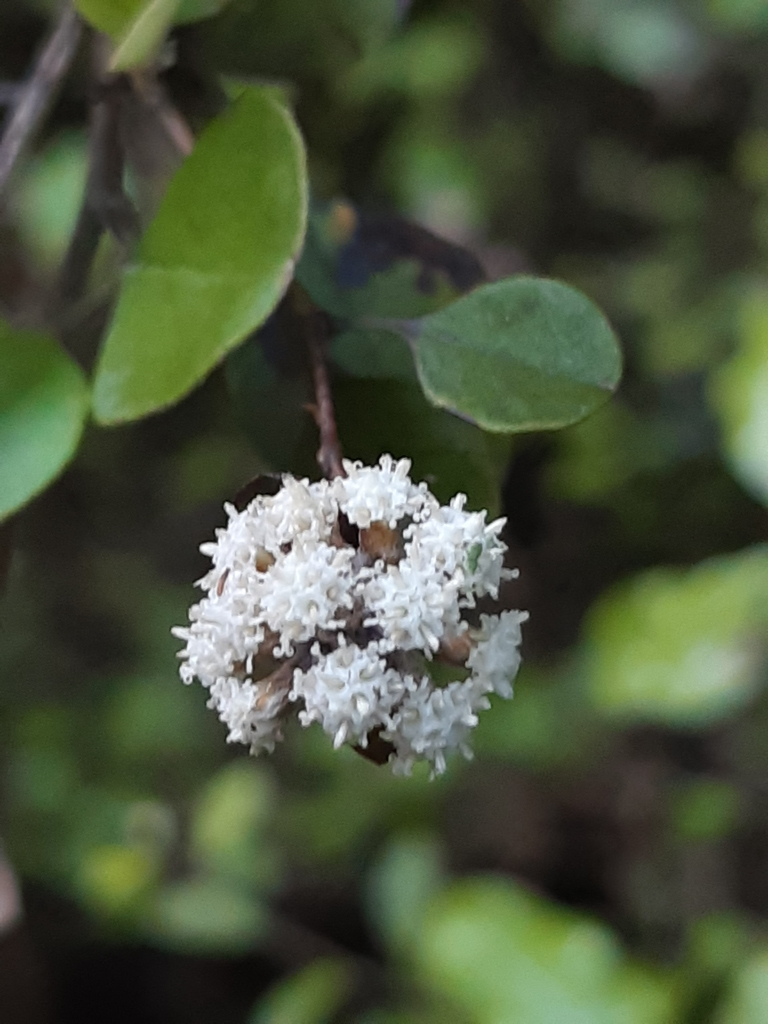
Composite flower head

The flower heads consist of abundant clusters of very small, up to 1 cm diameter, creamy white, scented flower heads. These can be confused with the furry galls induced by Cecidomyiidae larvae. The composite or compound flowers, resembling a single flower, are made up of multiple small flowers bordered by rows of discreet bracts; the whole structure termed a capitulum.

Morphological differences are strongly linked to habitat and soil substrate with much smaller leaves found on plants growing in full sun and in rocky soil.

== Varieties ==
Helichrysum lanceolatum contains the following varieties:

- Helichrysum lanceolatum var. majus
- Helichrysum lanceolatum var. lanceolatum
- Helichrysum lanceolatum var. glomeratum

== Range ==
=== Natural global range ===
Helichrysum lanceolatum is endemic to New Zealand, so only occurs in Aotearoa/New Zealand.

The genus Helichrysum has 500–600 species in Africa, Madagascar, the Mediterranean basin, Macaronesia, western and central Asia, and India.

=== New Zealand range ===
Helichrysum lanceolatum is found throughout New Zealand and is widespread. It is termed morphologically variable, meaning it has differing forms depending on habitat and geographical location. Its New Zealand range is from the Northland Peninsula to the south of the South Island from sea level to about 900 m (3,000 ft). It is also found on Great Barrier Island and the Chatham Islands.

== Habitat ==
Helichrysum lanceolatum grows well in dry soil and prefers open, sunny aspects and rocky ground. Historically thought to grow only in rocky habitats it now appears to grow well in ecologically disturbed sites, forest margins, as well as dry and humid and open forest ecosystems and coastal habitats. It is one of several native shrubby understory species in pōhutukawa/kānuka dominant forest on Great Barrier Island.

== Ecology ==
=== Life cycle and phenology ===
Helichrysum lancoelatum has composite flowers which encourages pollination. Many flowers can be pollinated by a single visiting insect, even though only 2–3 florets within a cluster of 8–12 are female.

Insects are attracted by nectar-secreting glands on the inner base of each single flower, a strategy for mass pollination by a single insect visit.

Following successful fertilisation, flowers wither and drop off, allowing seeds to develop within achenes. Achenes are hard-shelled casings for a single seed and are covered with fine, downy hairs that act as parachutes aiding wind dispersal function.

Aaron Wilton's research in 1997 suggests that most native Helichrysum species are pollinated by a wide range of insects, though more research is needed on pollination or phenology of New Zealand Helichrysum species. H. lanceolatum flowers from October to January with seeds ripening in February and fruit developing in December.

=== Diet and foraging ===
Helichrysum lanceolatum prefers rocky soils and full sun and grows well in dry soil and can tolerate low rainfall. It is also one of many native shrubs within the coastal, mid-dune plant community, so can tolerate a sandy soil substrate. Interestingly, a 2004 study showed the H. lanceolatum populations of Central Otago, a drastically modified environment, to be more susceptible to fire and drought, perhaps due to the sparse vegetation cover and disturbed ecology of the area.

While not unpalatable, a 2002 study showed Helichrysum lanceolatum to be less palatable to introduced ungulates than other native species.

=== Predators, parasites, and diseases ===
H. lanceolatum is a host plant to some species in the native gall fly family Cecidomyiidae, whose larvae induce a large gall on the developing flower head. More research is needed to understand the relationship between these species.

Other examples of moth species whose larvae feed on H. lanceolatum are the Pseudocoremia rudisata, and the Celama parvitis, a rare small moth, occurring in eastern and inland South Island shrublands whose larvae feed on the foliage of H. lanceolatum. The larvae of another moth species, Helastia siris, may be associated with H. lanceolatum though more research is needed.

A subsequent study has highlighted the association between the moth species Helastia triphragma and H. lanceolatum on Ōtamahua/Quail Island in Whakaraupō/Lyttelton Harbour and suggests that increasing plantings of H. lanceolatum may help to keep populations of this moth stable and attract other native moths like Asterivora chatuidea.

== Interesting facts ==
The Latin derivation for Helichrysum comes from the Greek word, helios, the sun; chrysos, gold and lanecolatum, lance shaped; from the Latin lancea, light lance, spear. The Māori name niniao means glowing as dawn.

H. lanceolatum has many historical synonyms and has been named both Helichrysum glomeratum and Helichrysum aggregatum, both describing the ball-shaped flower heads.

In New Zealand Flora Vol. 1, H.H Allan, 1982, recognised three varieties due to different growing habits, distribution, and leaf size and shape; Helichrysum glomeratum, and var lanceolatum and var majus. The species Helichrysum glomeratum var lanceolatum was soon found to already be named Helichrysum lanceolatum, and var majus not specifically distinct from H. lanecolatum, thus Helichrysum lanceolatum remained the official scientific name.

A DNA sequencing study in 2007 of H. lanceolatum and Anaphalioides bellioides, previously Helichrysum bellioides, showed intergeneric hybridisation (crossing of genes between two distinct species within the same genus), occurring between these endemic species. Both species belong to the Gnaphieae tribe (Asteraceae family). The study looked at species from two distant Banks Peninsula populations, at Gibraltar Rock in the southern Port Hills and Long Bay Road in the remote eastern bays; the hybrids studied showed many distinctive traits, of particular note, serrated leaves, a trait of neither parent plant and they demonstrated lower fertility. The hybrid species has been named Helichrysum purdiei.

Hybrids between Helichrysum lanceolatum and Ewartiothamnus sinclairii (Hook.f.) have also been reported.

The late botanist Tony Druce noted that plants from Paerutu (Surville Cliffs), in Te Paki Ecological District on the Northern most point of the North Island might be a distinct species due to their trailing growth habit. This population also has fewer side branches, and smaller leaves than other North Island populations. Druce also identified a large round-leaved form from Hick's Bay and recognized this species as having distinctive characteristics. More recent studies have shown little genetic variation between populations, but some variability between geographically distant populations.
