= Pariwhero / Red Rocks =

Rock formation near Wellington, New Zealand

Pariwhero / Red Rocks Pariwhero (Māori)
- Rock formation
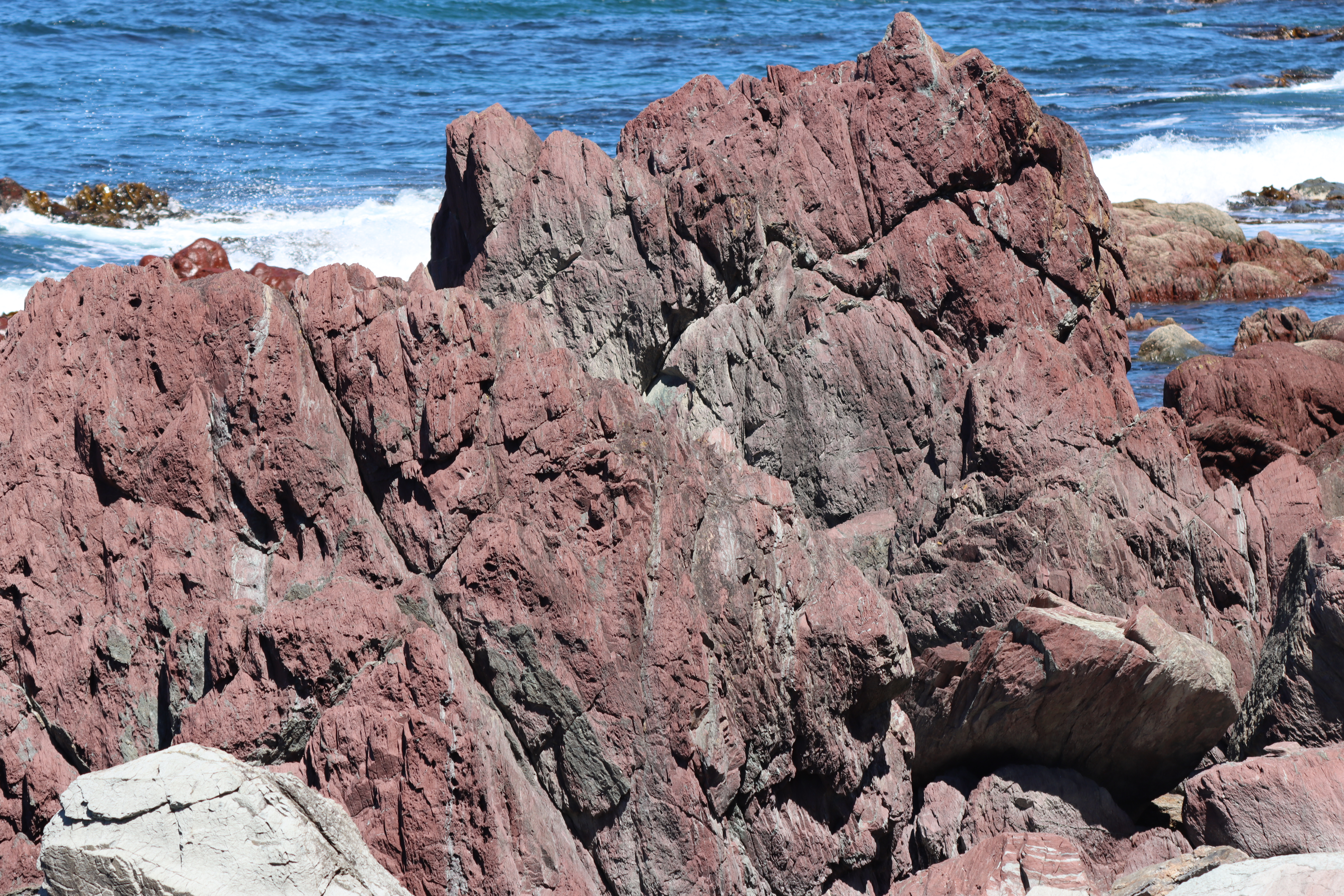
- Red-coloured rocks at Pariwhero / Red Rocks
- Interactive map of Pariwhero / Red Rocks
- Coordinates: 41.359°S 174.725°E
- Location: Wellington South coast
- Etymology: Named for the site's red rocks. Pariwhero translates as Red Cliffs
- Defining authority: New Zealand Geographic Board

Area
  - Total: 0.52 hectares (1.3 acres)
- Designation: Scientific Reserve

Pariwhero / Red Rocks is a geological formation located in a scientific reserve on the south coast of Wellington, New Zealand. The site has been classified as nationally significant, and of high educational and scientific importance. The reserve provides examples of a wide range of rock formations and geological processes that are representative of the earliest stages in the formation of New Zealand. Access to the site is along a walking track from Te Kopahou Reserve visitor centre in Ōwhiro Bay. The track is a popular attraction and provides access for observation of New Zealand fur seals at Sinclair Head, just beyond Red Rocks.

== History ==
Pariwhero has been known to Māori from the earliest times of Māori occupation in the area, with Māori having multiple explanations for the red colour of the rocks. One of these accounts is that the legendary explorer Kupe left the Wellington area, crossing Te Moana-a-Raukawa (Cook Strait) as he left. His long absence caused his relatives to become worried, with one of his daughters leaping from a cliff on the south coast in her distress, staining the rocks below with her blood. In another account, Kupe was gathering the shellfish pāua in the vicinity when one of them clamped his hand and he bled on to the rocks. The area of the rust-coloured rock formations is known as Pariwhero, meaning red rocks.

Pariwhero / Red Rocks has an official dual name as one of the outcomes of the settlement between the Crown and a collective of several local iwi, Taranaki Whānui ki te Upoko o te Ika, for breaches of the Treaty of Waitangi. The official name was changed from the previous name Red Rocks to the dual name as part of cultural redress included in the Deed of Settlement, and came into effect following the passing of the Port Nicholson Block (Taranaki Whānui ki Te Upoko o Te Ika) Claims Settlement Act 2009.

In addition to the adoption of the dual name Pariwhero / Red Rocks as part of 2009 settlement between the Crown and Taranaki Whānui ki Te Upoko o Te Ika, the Red Rocks Scientific Reserve was also included in a later settlement between the Crown and the iwi Ngāti Toa Rangatira in 2012. The settlement required the Crown to offer Ngāti Toa Rangatira deeds of recognition and statutory acknowledgements to recognise the association of the iwi with specific areas in the Cook Strait region, including the Red Rocks Scientific Reserve.

== Scientific reserve ==
In 1971, a small strip of 0.52 hectares (1.3 acres) of coastline was set aside under the Reserves Act 1977 for protection of the area as the Red Rocks Scientific Reserve. The site has been classified as nationally significant, and of high educational and scientific importance. The reserve provides examples of a wide range of rock formations and geological processes that are representative of the earliest stages in the formation of New Zealand.

== Access ==
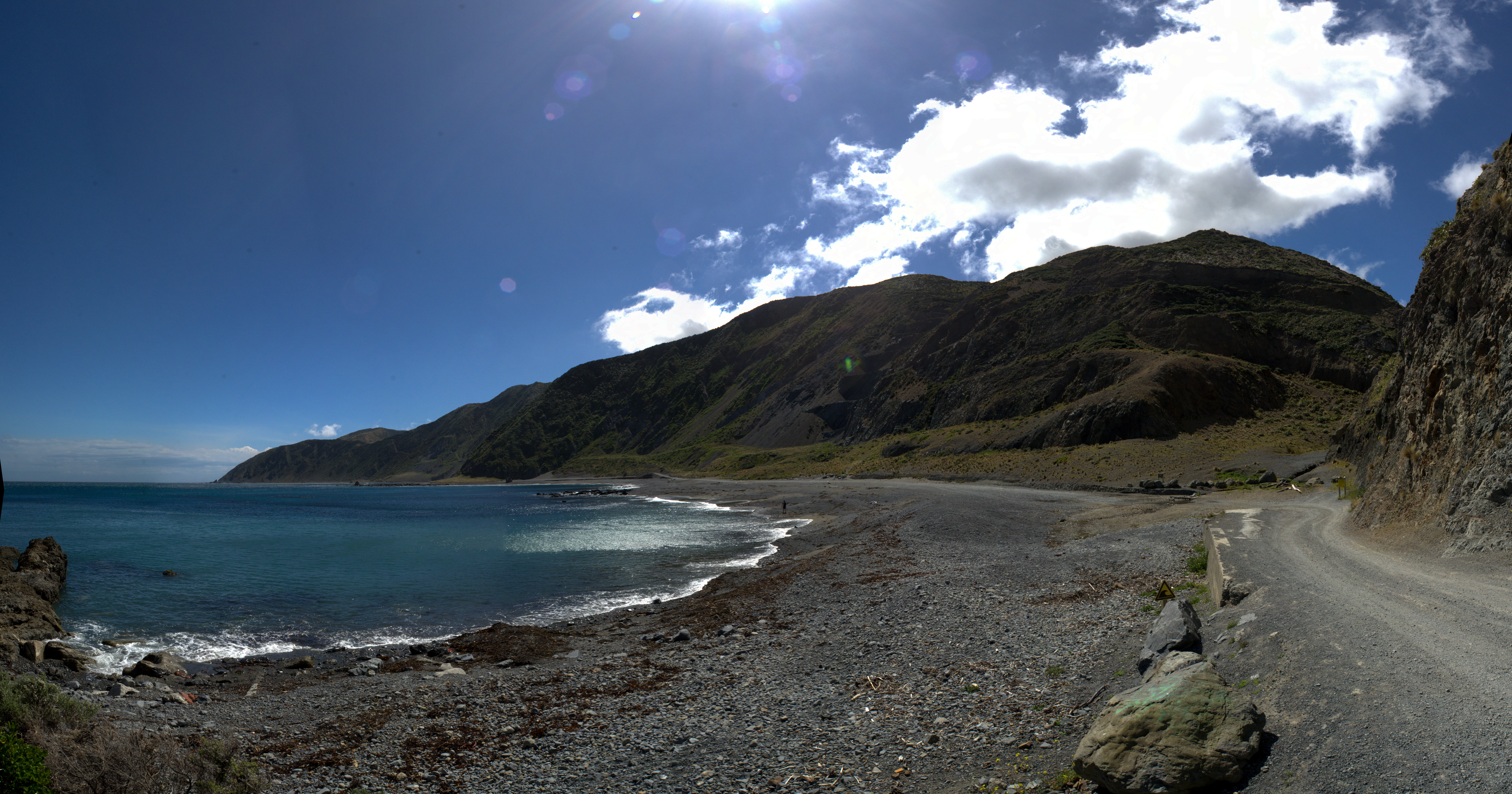
Red Rocks walkway

Access to the Red Rocks Scientific Reserve is via a gravel track on a raised beach platform along the Wellington south coast. The track passes Red Rocks and continues to Sinclair Head and Devil's Gate, where New Zealand fur seals may be seen, particularly between May and August. The seal colony is a popular visitor attraction. Pariwhero / Red Rocks is approximately 2 kilometres (1.2 mi) from the Te Kopahou Reserve visitor centre in Ōwhiro Bay.

== Geology of the red rocks ==
Although outcrops of “red rocks” are known from a few other places in the Wellington area, the coastal exposure at Pariwhero is the most important as it provides some of the best evidence of the relationship between the “red rocks” and the enclosing greywacke sediments, supporting an explanation for their origin.

The red rocks sequence exposed on the shore platform is about 150 metres (160 yd) thick and is tilted to near vertical with respect to the shoreline. From west to east the sequence consists of: basaltic pillow lava, pinkish-white chert, red chert then green siltstone, another pinkish-white chert, red then green siltstone, followed by thicker beds of red then grey siltstone. The contact between the eastern-most green then red siltstones is sheared and contorted suggesting faulting parallel to the bedding plane or structural break. The pillow lava is bounded to the west by alternating greywacke and black siltstone, and to the east of the grey siltstone by massive greywacke sandstone. The eastern red then grey siltstones were deposited in the Late Triassic about 210 Ma. However, the reddish purple pillow lava, pinkish-white cherts, and red and green siltstones adjacent to the cherts date from the Late Permian about 250 Ma. This means rocks alongside each other at Pariwhero can differ in age by about 40–50 million years. The ages of the rocks have been established by analysis of specimens of radiolaria obtained from samples taken on both sides of the red rocks sequence, the eastern grey siltstone and the pinkish-white chert within the sequence. The greywacke on both sides of the sequence is the same age as the eastern red and grey siltstones.

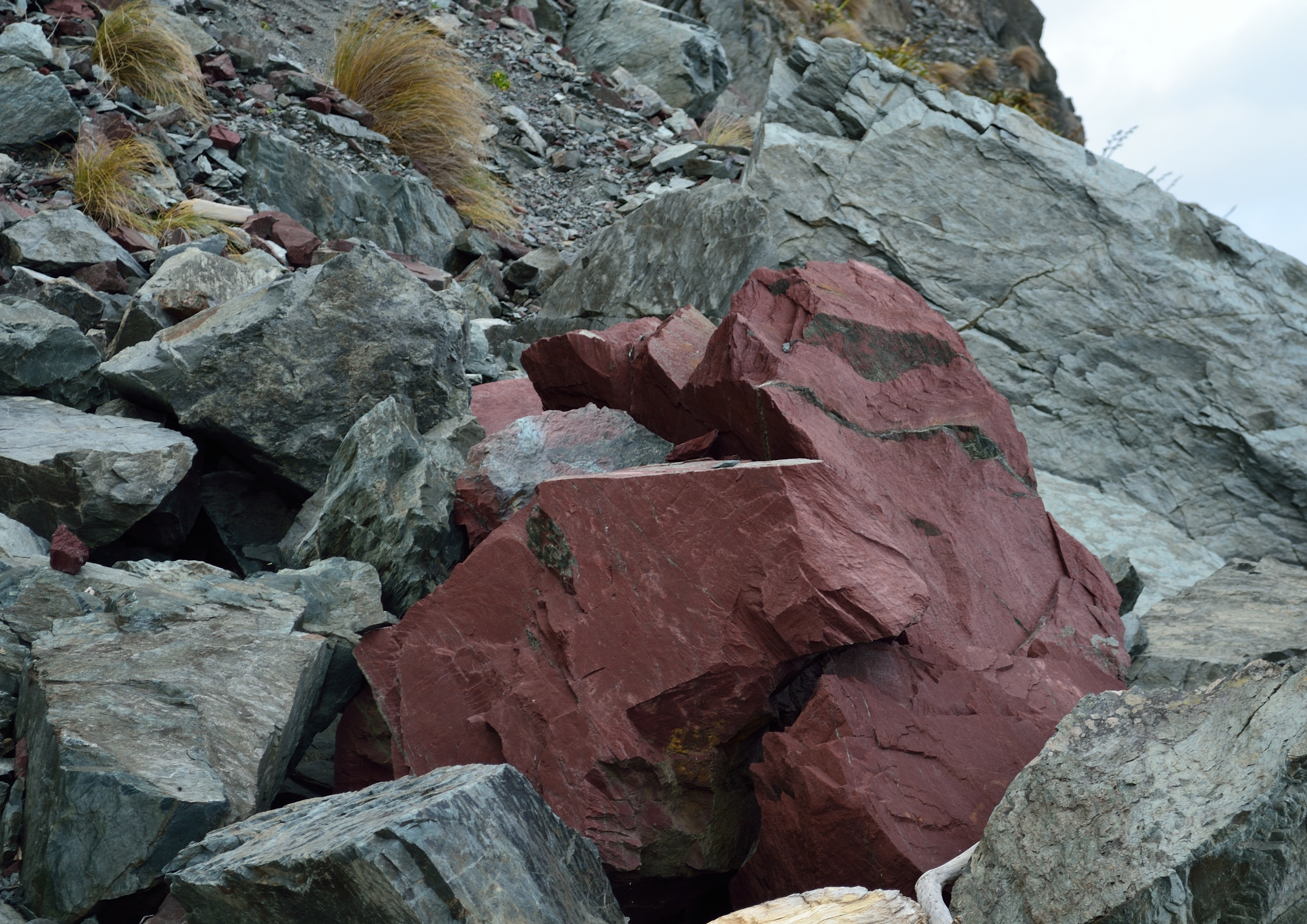
Boulder at Red Rocks Scientific Reserve

The colours of the rocks at Pariwhero vary, depending on the ratio of ferric to ferrous iron compounds in the rock and therefore the extent of oxidisation. Siltstones and chert sediments accumulated on the sea floor at a slower rate than the greywacke siltstone from turbidites allowing more time for the sediments to become oxygenated by interaction with seawater. If sedimentation is very slow the level of oxidation can reach saturation point and hematite (a ferric compound) forms in the sediment giving it its red colour. Less oxidised siltstone is green grading to low oxidised grey siltstone. Basalt erupting underwater can react with seawater to modify or replace minerals in the basalt. When iron is released from alteration of minerals it may become oxidised to form hematite giving the basalt its reddish purple colour.

Three types of reddish-coloured rocks can be seen at the site:

- brick-red siltstone - this is the most common type of red rock
- purple-red basalt lava - typically with pillow shapes that indicate they were formed in an underwater eruption
- red and pinkish-white cherts of late Permian age - these are some of the oldest rocks in the North Island

== Origin of the red rocks ==
The explanation for how older rocks at Pariwhero became surrounded by younger rocks begins at the boundary between two colliding tectonic plates. In the Late Triassic around 210 Ma, two portions of the Earth's crust, the paleo-Pacific plate (oceanic crust) and the southern margin of the supercontinent of Gondwana, were colliding. The paleo-Pacific plate was sliding underneath Gondwana in a process called subduction and an accretionary wedge had formed in the subduction zone. The accretionary sediments included greywacke turbidites derived from erosion of continental material and lesser amounts of deep-ocean sediments (mostly siltstone and siliceous ooze) scraped off the seafloor of the subducting plate.

As the paleo-Pacific plate converged with Gondwana it also carried with it basaltic volcanoes (called seamounts). When a seamount entered the subduction zone it pushed sediments in the trench up and over due to increasing compression. It also temporarily blocked the greywacke turbidity currents allowing slower background deposition of oceanic sediments on the ocean- side i.e. forming the eastern red and grey siltstones. On the ocean-facing side of the seamount it is thought material on the flanks of the volcano, sometimes coherent slabs hundreds of metres long (consisting of basalt, oceanic siltstones, chert and limestone), moved downslope by gravity, and slid onto younger siltstone sediments. The sheared contact at the base of the Late Permian rocks (the bottom of the eastern green siltstone) could be the original plane where sliding occurred. With gradual burial of the seamount, the slide deposit became covered by continuing sedimentation and was preserved. The seamount was presumed to have been subducted because the only evidence it once existed is a small fragment found at Pariwhero. This scenario can be seen today at the Hikurangi Trough off the east coast of the North Island. A seamount is beginning to become submerged within sediments at the landward side of the trench and will probably end up being subducted under the Australian Plate leaving behind traces of its past existence in the accretionary wedge.

After millions of years of subduction the greywacke turbidites and incorporated seamount remnants were buried to a depth of 9–12 km where high pressure and temperatures of 250–300 °C weakly metamorphosed the sediments. During burial, the sediments were folded and faulted by the ongoing collision of the plates and eventually became uplifted and accreted to the continent of Gondwana. It is thought that subduction ceased around 100 Ma. Then about 85 Ma, southern Gondwana began to break up into Australia, Antarctica, and a large portion of its eastern margin that became Zealandia. Zealandia drifted away from Australia and Antarctica and was relatively quiet tectonically until about 25 Ma when a new phase of plate tectonic activity saw the Pacific Plate start to subduct under the Australian plate.

During the Pliocene (5–3 Ma), convergence of the plates east of the North Island caused activation of NE–SW trending faults in the North Island and the early beginnings of the North Island axial ranges. The eastern edge of the Australian Plate continued to be squeezed and crumpled by the collision of the plates, creating the North Island axial ranges extending from the Remutaka Range to the Raukūmara Range in East Cape. Greywacke is the main rock type in the axial ranges. It is hard and resists erosion. The rock type of the Wellington area is primarily greywacke with a few small outcrops of red rocks derived from associated submarine volcanic rocks. Pariwhero is the best exposed example in New Zealand of “red rocks” enclosed by greywacke.

== In popular culture ==
A novel for children, Red Rocks, written by Rachael King uses the rocks on the Wellington south coast as a setting. The novel was shortlisted for the Junior Fiction category in the 2013 New Zealand Post Children's Book Awards and won the LIANZA Esther Glen Award. A 2025 television drama series Secrets at Red Rocks was based on the novel.
