= Sinclair Head =

Promontory on North Island, New Zealand

Sinclair Head Te Rimurapa (Māori)
- Headland
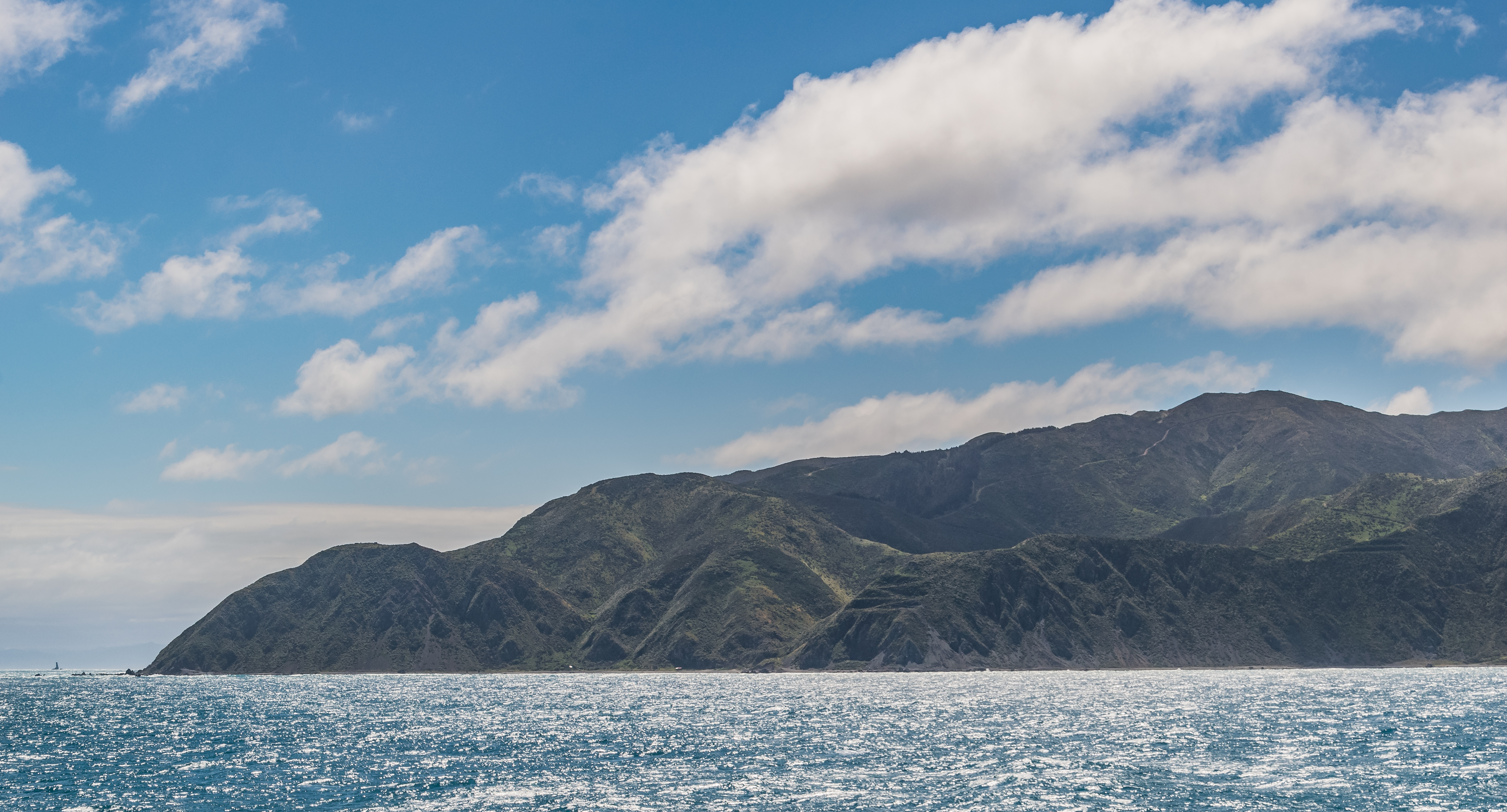
- Sinclair Head, as seen from the east

- Location within New Zealand Wellington
- Coordinates: 41°21′45″S 174°43′00″E
- Location: Wellington South coast

Sinclair Head Māori: Te Rimurapa is a major promontory on the south coast of New Zealand's North Island. It lies 14 kilometres (8.7 mi) to the west of the entrance to Wellington Harbour, and a similar distance to the east of Cape Terawhiti.

The headland is named for Sir George Sinclair, a director of the New Zealand Company. The Māori name literally means "the search for seaweed".

Sinclair Head is home to a non-breeding colony of New Zealand fur seals, with resident seal numbers ranging from over 300 in winter to about 50 in summer when only the non-breeding males stay behind. The seal haul-out is also known as the Red Rocks seal colony, named after an area of red coloured rocks immediately east of the headland.
