= Te Kopahou Reserve =

Reserve in Wellington, New Zealand

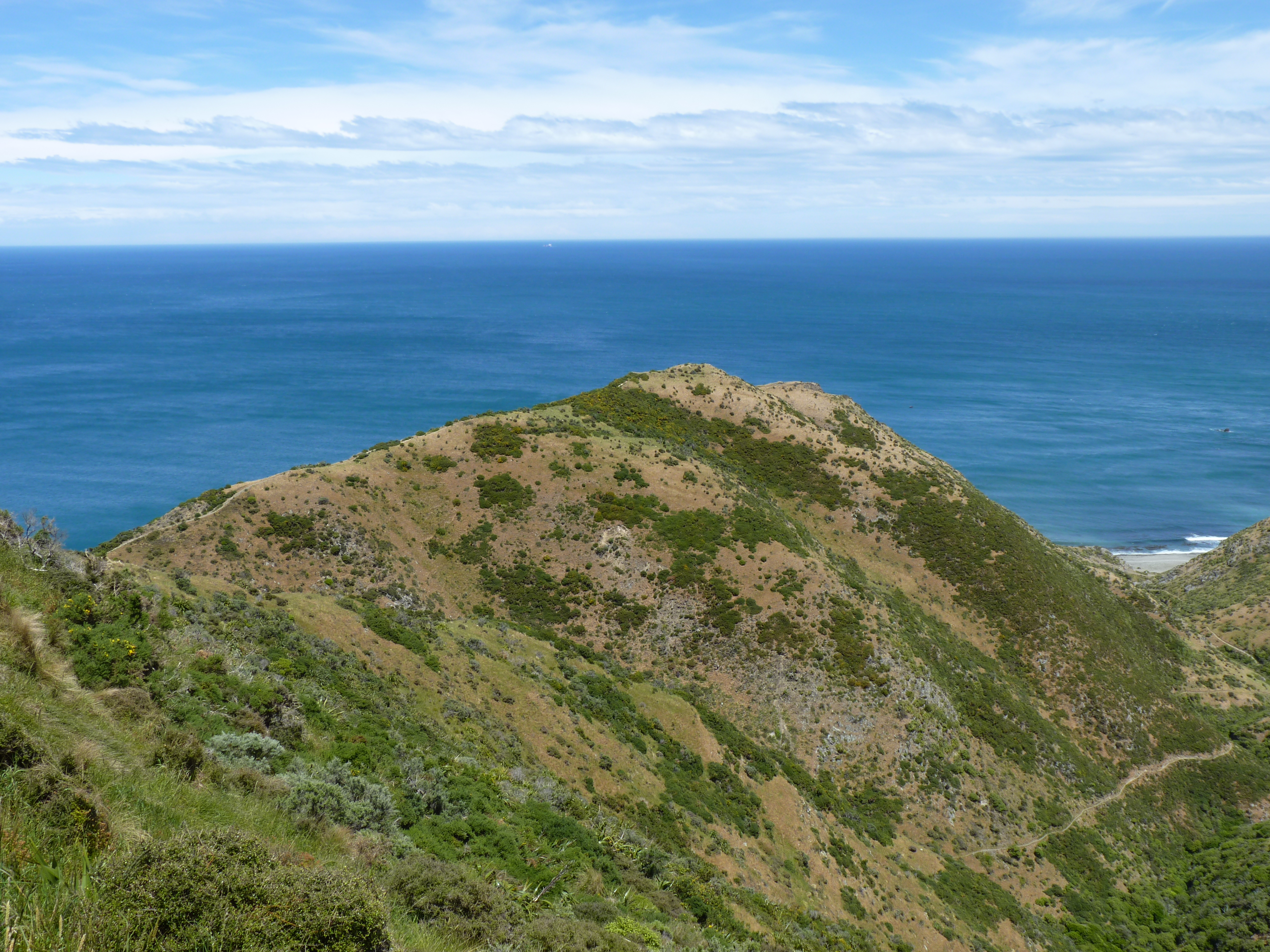
- View towards south coast and Cook Strait
- Interactive map of Te Kopahou Reserve
- Nearest city: Wellington
- Coordinates: 41.3406°S 174.7231°E
- Area: 600 ha (1,500 acres)
- Governing body: Wellington City Council

The Te Kopahou Reserve is a scenic, conservation and recreation reserve in Wellington in the North Island of New Zealand. It is located on the south coast of Wellington, and features rugged landscape including the sea coast adjoining Cook Strait, and the hill tops of Te Kopahou and Hawkins Hill. The reserve extends from the suburb of Brooklyn to the south coast at Ōwhiro Bay, and westwards along the south coast to Pariwhero / Red Rocks and Sinclair Head / Rimurapa.

== Features ==
The coastline and hilltops provide views across Cook Strait to the South Island. The reserve includes bush-clad gullies and exposed ridgelines, and has a variety of walking and mountain biking tracks. The highest point in the reserve is Hawkins Hill at 495 metres (1,624 ft), the highest peak in Wellington City. There is a white radar dome (radome) that provides the primary radar and secondary surveillance radar for Wellington Airport and the wider Wellington region.

The peak Te Kopahou (485 metres) is to the south-west, along the ridgeline. Most of the land in the reserve is administered by the Wellington City Council.

== Pariwhero / Red Rocks ==
There is a flat walking track along the beach from the Owhiro Bay entrance to Te Kopahou Reserve, past an old quarry and a small group of historic cottages from the early 1900s, to the Red Rocks Scientific Reserve and beyond the distinctive red rocks to Devil's Gate at Sinclair Head. This is the location of a colony of New Zealand fur seals (Māori: Kekeno).

== Track development plan ==
In 2020 and 2021, the Wellington City Council consulted with the community over a draft long-term plan for the development of tracks in Te Kopahou Reserve.

== In popular culture ==
In 2021, the scenery of Te Kopahou Reserve was used as the main visual backdrop in a music video by the locally based artist Lake South, for his track Townbelt.
