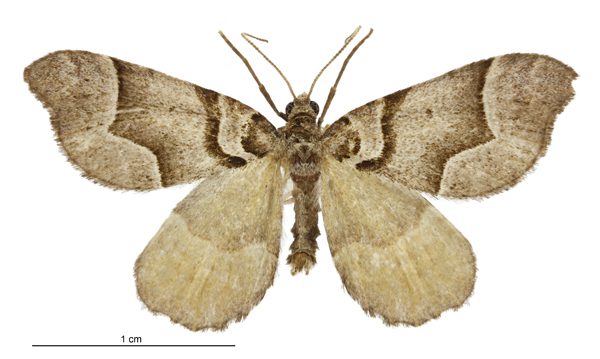
- Male

Conservation status
- Relict (NZ TCS)

Scientific classification
- Kingdom: Animalia
- Phylum: Arthropoda
- Class: Insecta
- Order: Lepidoptera
- Family: Geometridae
- Genus: Helastia
- Species: H. siris

Binomial name
- Helastia siris (Hawthorne, 1897)

Synonyms
- Asaphodes siris Hawthorne, 1897

= Helastia siris =

Species of moth

Helastia siris is a species of moth in the family Geometridae. This species is endemic to New Zealand and is found in the Wellington region as well as on Stephens and the Chatham Islands. It is classified as "At Risk, Relict'" by the Department of Conservation. H. siris inhabits coastal tussock grassland. Little is known of the biology of this species. Adults have been observed on the wing in March and September. Adults are nocturnal and are attracted to light.

== Taxonomy ==
This species was first described by E. F. Hawthorne in 1897 using a specimen he collected in Wellington (specifically at Cape Terawhiti) and named Asaphodes siris. George Hudson discussed and illustrated this species in his 1898 book under the same name and in his 1928 book as a synonym of Hydriomena triphragma. In 1987 Robin C. Craw placed this species within the genus Helastia. The holotype specimen is held at the Museum of New Zealand Te Papa Tongarewa.

== Description ==
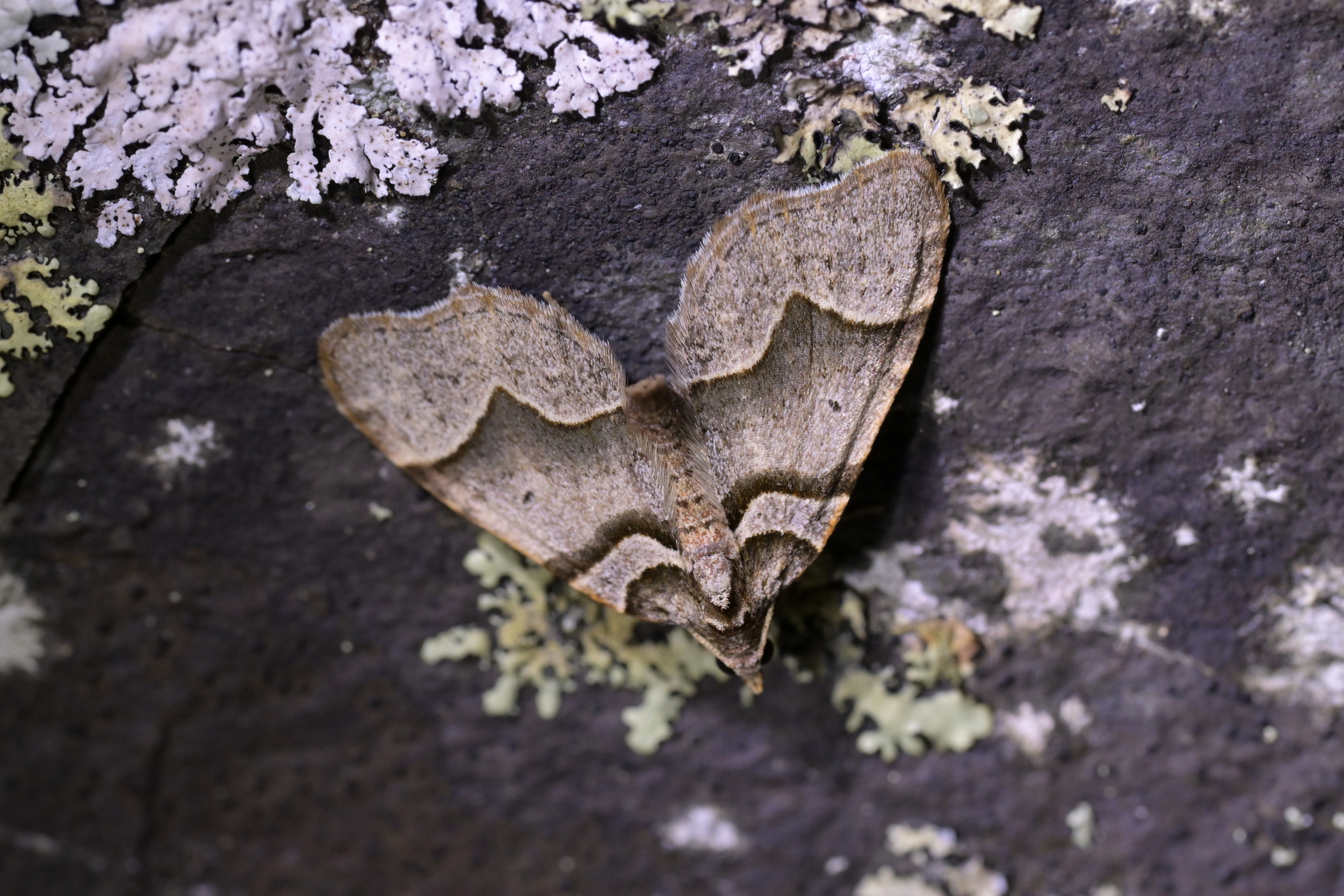
In Te Kopahou Reserve

Hudson described the species as follows:

The expansion of the wings is about 7/8 inch. The fore-wings are dull ochreous; there is a small curved brown patch near the base; then a pale band, followed by a very broad brown central band, paler in the middle; there is a very sharp projection on the outer edge of the central band, a conspicuous black dot in the centre of the wing, and a series of minute black dots on the termen. The hind-wings are pale ochreous, with a faint central transverse line.

== Distribution ==
This species is endemic to New Zealand. It occurs in Wellington, Stephens Island and in the Chatham Islands. It has been collected from Baring Head.

== Biology and lifecycle ==
Very little is known about the biology of H. siris. It is on the wing in March and September, is nocturnal and is attracted to light.

== Host species and habitat ==
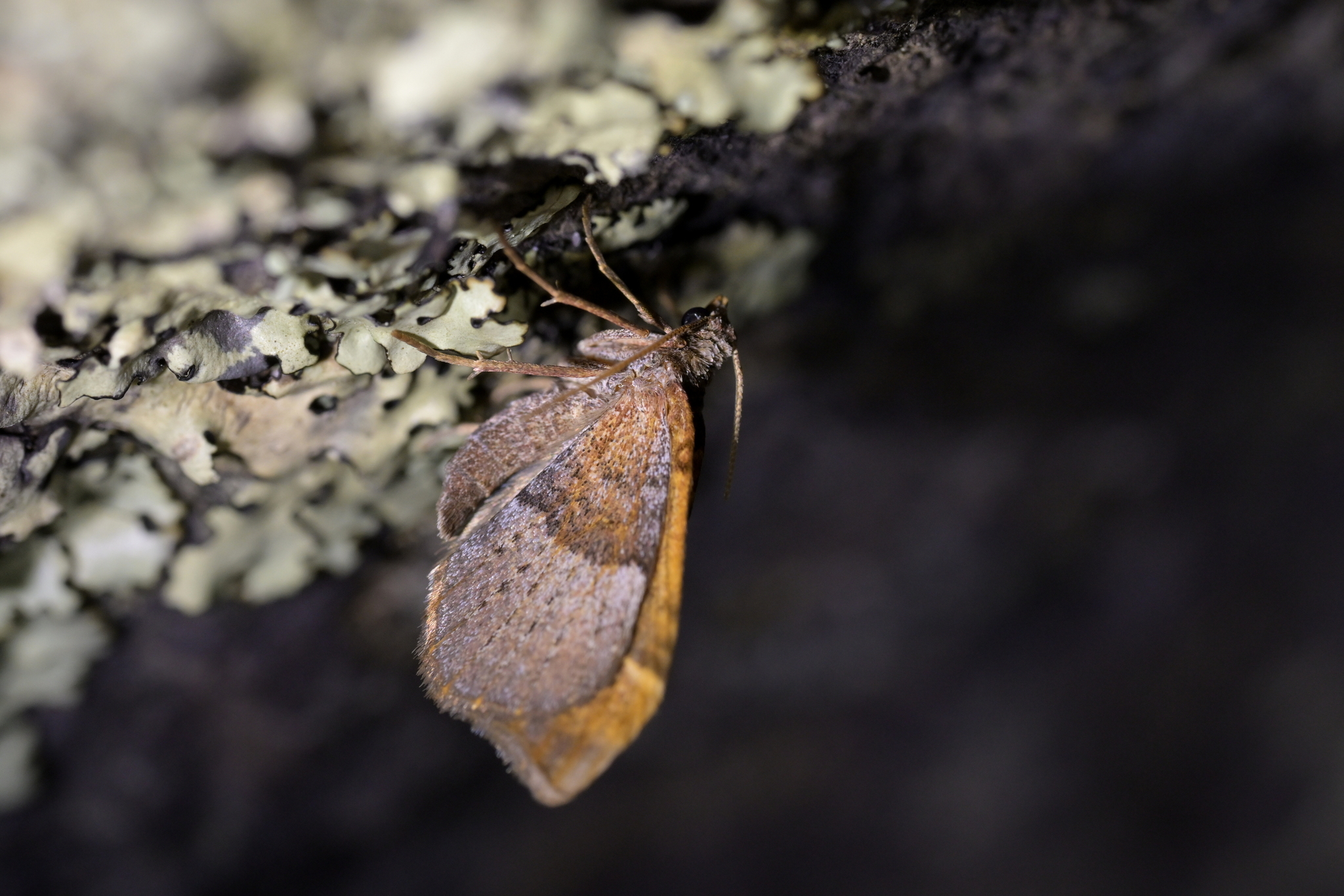
Underside of wings

This species prefers short tussock grassland habitat in coastal areas. The host species for the larvae of H. siris is unknown. It has been hypothesised the larvae of H. siris feed on the flowers of Helichrysum species and then feed on mosses, lichens or shrubs growing nearby.

== Conservation status ==
This moth is classified under the New Zealand Threat Classification system as being "At Risk, Relict".
